= Thorpe Thewles railway station =

Former railway station in England

Thorpe Thewles
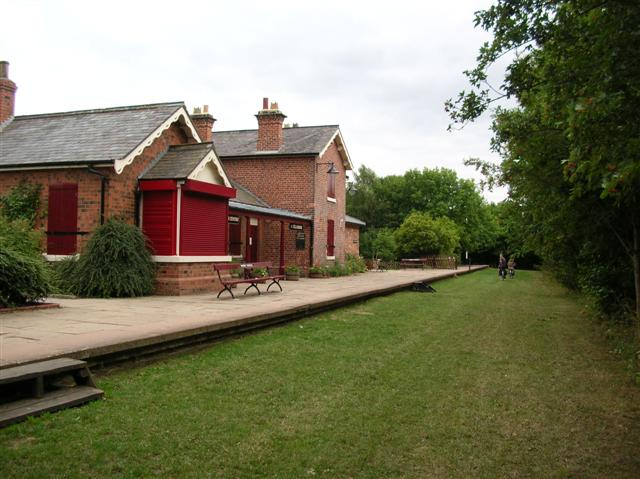
- The site of the station in August 2006

General information
- Location: Thorpe Thewles, Stockton-on-Tees; England
- Coordinates: 54.6126°N 1.3784°W
- Platforms: 2

Other information
- Status: Disused

History
- Original company: North Eastern Railway
- Pre-grouping: North Eastern Railway
- Post-grouping: London and North Eastern Railway

Key dates
- 1 August 1878: Station opened to goods
- 1 March 1880: Station opened to passengers
- 2 November 1931: Station closed to passengers
- 2 April 1951: Station closed completely
Location

Thorpe Thewles railway station was a stop on the Castle Eden branch of the North Eastern Railway (NER) from 1880 to 1931. It was located approximately 5 miles north of Stockton and was designed to serve the village of Thorpe Thewles and the civil parish of Grindon in Stockton-on-Tees, part of the Ceremonial County of Durham, North East England. Despite its name, the station was actually located further from the village of Thorpe Thewles than Carlton station (later Redmarshall) on the main line of the Clarence Railway.

== History ==
The NER gained powers in an act of Parliament to construct a line from Bowesfield Junction (where it joined the route of Stockton and Darlington Railway) to Wellfield Junction (on the route of the Hartlepool Dock and Railway) in 1872 and opened the line in stages, with the section north of Carlton Junction (where the line crossed the route of the Clarence Railway) opening to freight traffic on 1 August 1878 from which point Thorpe Thewles station was used for local goods traffic. However construction of the stations was not complete at this time, meaning that Thorpe Thewles' station master initially had to live in one of the cottages until the station buildings had been completed. Local passenger trains were eventually introduced on 1 March 1880 though these services only ever used the line north of Carlton junction from where they continued over the former Clarence Railway route to Stockton-on-Tees station.

The station was of a standard design used by the NER during the 1870s. It had two platforms: the northbound platform (on the west side of the tracks) had a small waiting shelter while on the southbound (eastern) platform there was the station master's house, a waiting room, canopied ticket office and, from 1906, a signal box. There were also three goods sidings on the eastern side of lines serving, coal staiths, a loading platform and a livestock paddock.

Passenger traffic on the line was always light, the line having been built primarily to allow freight to bypass the congested lines through Stockton and Hartlepool. Thorpe Thewles station served a parish which in 1881 had a population of just 234 people and in 1911 there were just 2,026 tickets issued at Thorpe Thewles station (this compares with 13,133 issued at Carlton station in the same year). Even so, there were four stopping passenger trains over the line per day in each direction in 1910 and the number increased to five each way by the 1930s.

As part of an agreement between the NER and the Marquess of Londonderry, that permitted the NER to construct the line through his land, the Marquess was granted permission to stop early morning and evening trains to or from London at a station on the line, with Thorpe Thewles being the most conveniently located to serve Wynyard Park, one of the seats of the Marquess. However, there is little evidence that any London bound trains ever used the line and thus, in 1894, permission was granted to stop 7:30 am express from Newcastle and the 6:30 pm express from York at Thorpe Thewles. There has also been one report that on one occasion, the station was used by a royal party to travel to Wynyard Park.

There was an incident shortly before the First World War when the station master of Thorpe Thewles station was murdered. His body was found by Mr G Dodds of the neighbouring station at Wynyard.

As part of the 1923 grouping, the NER became part of the London and North Eastern Railway (LNER). Passenger traffic remained low and consequentially, the LNER withdrew stopping passenger trains on 2 November 1931 from which point only goods were handled at Thorpe Thewles. Some express passenger trains did however continue to use the route. After the Second World War, the northbound track was, on several occasions, used to store surplus wagons, making the line only passable to southbound trains. Thorpe Thewles station was eventually closed completely on 2 April 1951 though the line was still used by mineral traffic until 6 July 1966.

After the line was closed and the tracks lifted, it was purchased by the two local authorities whose areas it passed through, meaning that the line through Thorpe Thewles came under the control of Cleveland County Council who converted it into the Castle Eden Walkway cycle path (now part of the Wynyard Woodland Park). The station master's house at Thorpe Thewles became a field centre in 1983. Since then the remaining station buildings have been brought back into use and the site now houses a visitor centre, café, gift shop and farm shop.

Preceding station	Historical railways	Following station
Stockton-on-Tees; Line closed, station open	North Eastern Railway; Castle Eden Railway	Wynyard; Line and station closed
