= Quarry (disambiguation) =

A quarry is a type of mine, usually open-cast, generally for the extraction of stone such as for building or fossil fuel.

Quarry or Quarries may also refer to:

- The subject of any pursuit, especially game being hunted

== Arts and entertainment ==
=== Film and television ===
- Quarry (TV series), based on Max Allan Collins' novels
- "Quarry" (Law & Order: Special Victims Unit), episode 13 of season 6
- "Quarry" (A Touch of Frost), a 1995 television episode
- The Quarry (1998 film), a Belgian film
- The Quarry (2020 film), an American film

=== Literature ===
- Quarry (novel), a 2011 novel by Ally Kennen
- Quarry, a series of novels by Max Allan Collins
- The Quarry (Banks novel), a 2013 novel by Iain Banks
- The Quarry (Dürrenmatt novel) or Suspicion, a 1951 novel by Friedrich Dürrenmatt
- The Quarry, a novel by Charles W. Chesnutt written in 1928 and published in 1999
- The Quarry, a 2006 novel by Damon Galgut
- The Quarry, a 1947 novel by Mildred Walker
- The Quarry, a 2015 essay collection by Susan Howe

=== Music ===
- Quarry, Liverpool, an independent music venue in Liverpool

=== Other media ===
- The Quarry (painting), an 1857 painting by Gustave Courbet
- The Quarry (video game), a 2022 horror video game

== Places ==
- Quarries (biblical), limestone quarries beneath ancient Jerusalem
- Quarries, a neighbourhood in Ottawa, Ontario, Canada, also known as Carson Meadows
- Quarries Reach, a reach of the Brisbane River, Queensland, Australia
- Quarry, Newfoundland and Labrador, an abandoned railway community in Newfoundland, Canada
- Quarry, County Westmeath, a townland in Mullingar civil parish, Ireland
- Quarry, Iowa, United States, an unincorporated community
- Quarry, Ohio, United States, a ghost town
- Quarry, Texas, United States, an unincorporated community
- The Quarry (park), the main park of Shrewsbury, England
- Quarry Hill, Hong Kong
- Quarry Lake (Nova Scotia), a lake in Halifax, Nova Scotia, Canada
- Quarry Lake (Maryland), a lake in Pikesville, Maryland, United States

== Other uses ==
- Quarry (surname)
- Quarry (company), a marketing communications agency headquartered in St. Jacobs, Ontario

== See also ==
- Quarry Farm, Elmira, New York, United States, a place where Mark Twain and his family summered for over 20 years
- Quarry Falls, Ontario, Canada
- Quarry Wood (disambiguation)
- Query (disambiguation)
- Meta:Research:Quarry, a public querying interface for Wiki Replicas
