= Wolviston =

Village in County Durham, England

Coordinates: 54°37′N 1°17′W

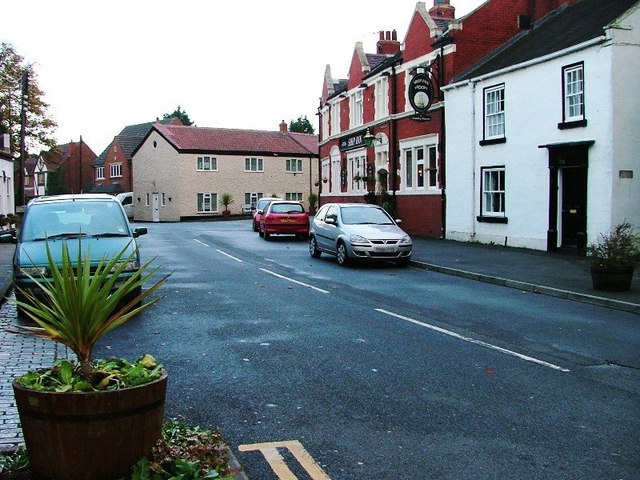
Wolviston High Street

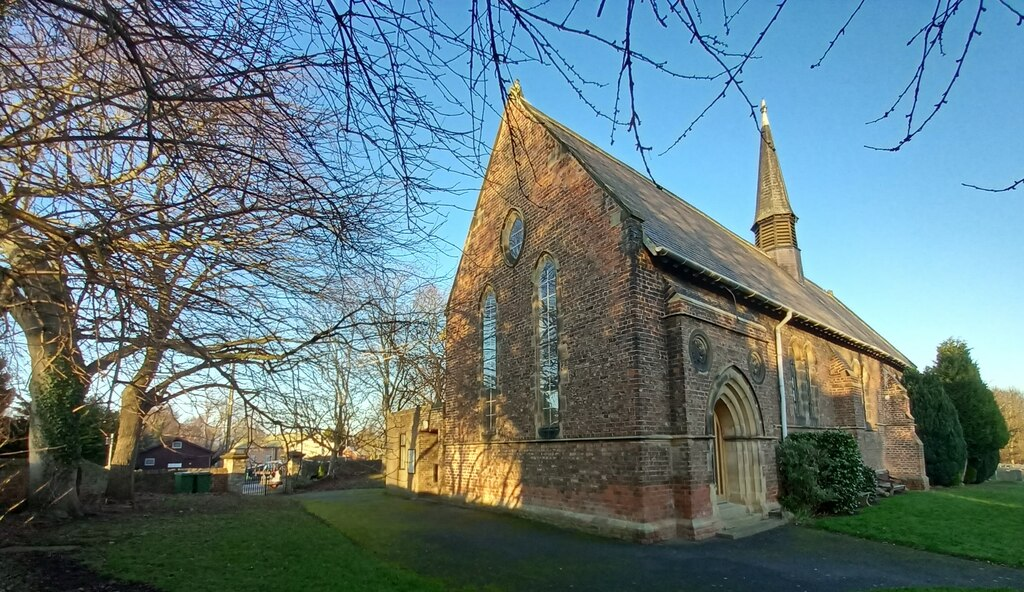
St Peter's Church

Wolviston is a village and civil parish within the borough of Stockton-on-Tees and the ceremonial county of County Durham, England. The population of the civil parish as of the 2011 census was 877. It is situated in the north of Billingham. The village has several businesses, including a florist, saddlery, international consultancy firm, riding school and post office. Wolviston benefits from a pub, the Wellington Inn, with the former Ship Inn now a residential property. It has a traditional village green and a duck pond.

== History ==
Wolviston can be traced back to before the Norman Conquest (1066), with name changes that appear to be related to Saxon times. In the 11th century it was known as Olverstona, in the 16th as Wulston and as Woulston in the late 17th century. In 1577 Wolviston became a separate parish. There have been two churches in the village. The first, from the 12th century and dedicated to St Mary Magdelene, fell into disrepair in the 16th century but was restored in 1716. In 1876 a new church dedicated to St Peter was built behind the High Street and the old church was demolished in 1878. The new building was renovated in 1969–1972.

== The village today ==
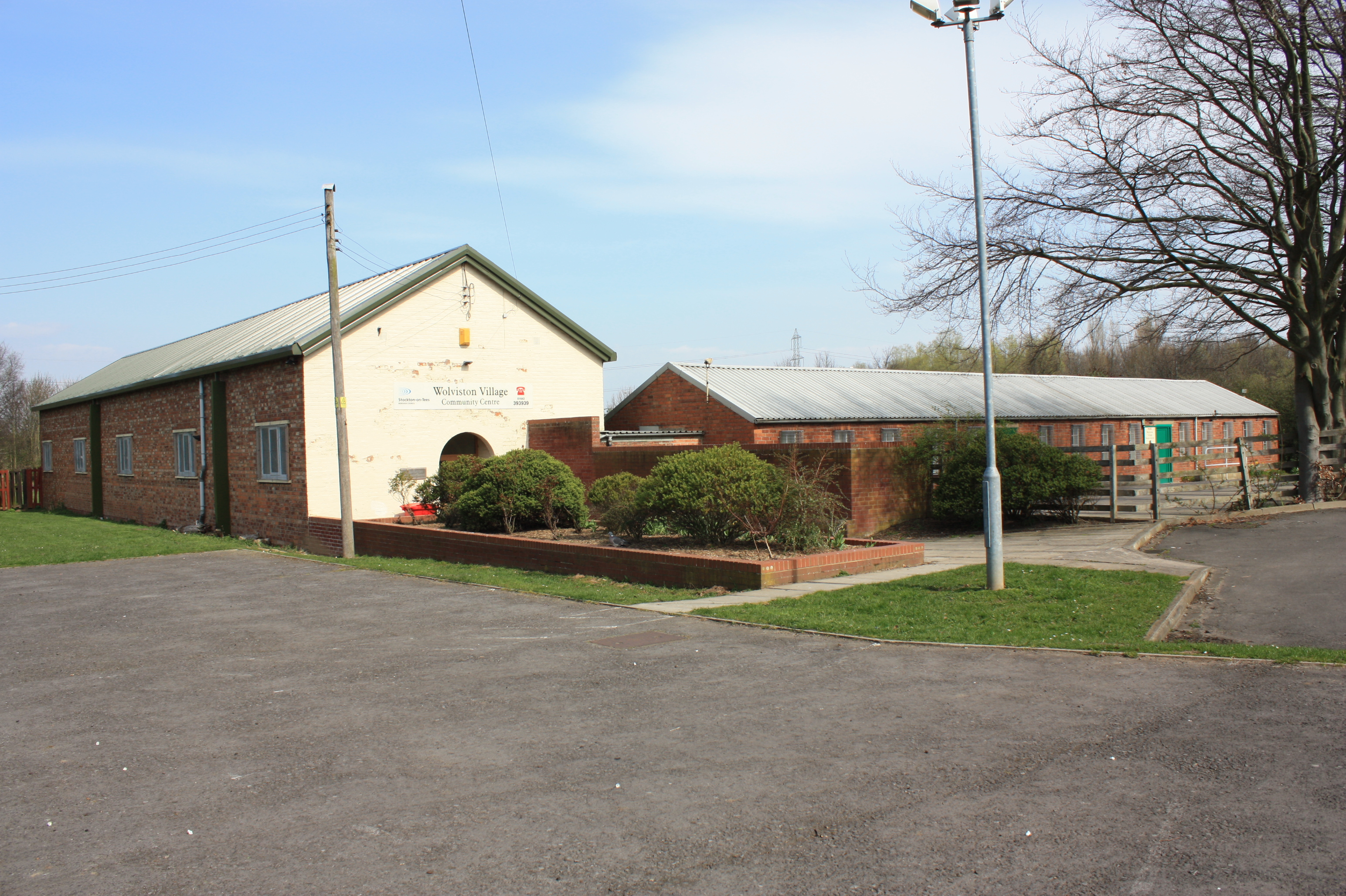
The village community centre

Wolviston is a community with a cricket and a Wearside League football team, a guides association and allotment holders' club.

Near to Wolviston in Wynyard is Wynyard Hall, historically the family home of the Londonderry dynasty, whose fortune came from the ownership of several collieries and a port in County Durham. The present Wynyard Hall was completed in 1848 and many royal visitors were entertained there over the following hundred years. The war memorial commemorates the Wolviston casualties in both World Wars.

The A19 ran through the village until it was bypassed in the 1970s to the east then in the 1980s bypassed to the west when the original bypass became gridlocked towards Billingham and Stockton during rush hours. The A689 also used to run through the village but was bypassed to the north in the 1970s.
