= LNER electric units =

The London and North Eastern Railway (LNER) operated different types of electric multiple units.

- British Rail Class 306, introduced in 1949 on the suburban lines out of London Liverpool Street
- British Rail Class 505, introduced in 1931, jointly with the London, Midland and Scottish Railway, in the Manchester area
- British Rail Class 506, introduced in 1954 in the Manchester area
- LNER Tyneside electric units, introduced in 1937 in Tyneside
- London Underground 1938 Stock, 289 cars of which were LNER property
- NER electric units, absorbed from the North Eastern Railway in 1923
