= Wynyard railway station (England) =

Disused railway station in County Durham, England

Wynyard

General information
- Location: Wynyard Park, County Durham; England
- Coordinates: 54.6486°N 1.3746°W
- Platforms: 2

Other information
- Status: Disused

History
- Original company: North Eastern Railway
- Pre-grouping: North Eastern Railway
- Post-grouping: LNER

Key dates
- 1 August 1878: Station opened to goods
- 1 March 1880: Station opened to passengers
- 2 November 1931: Station closed to passengers
- 2 April 1951: Station closed completely
Location

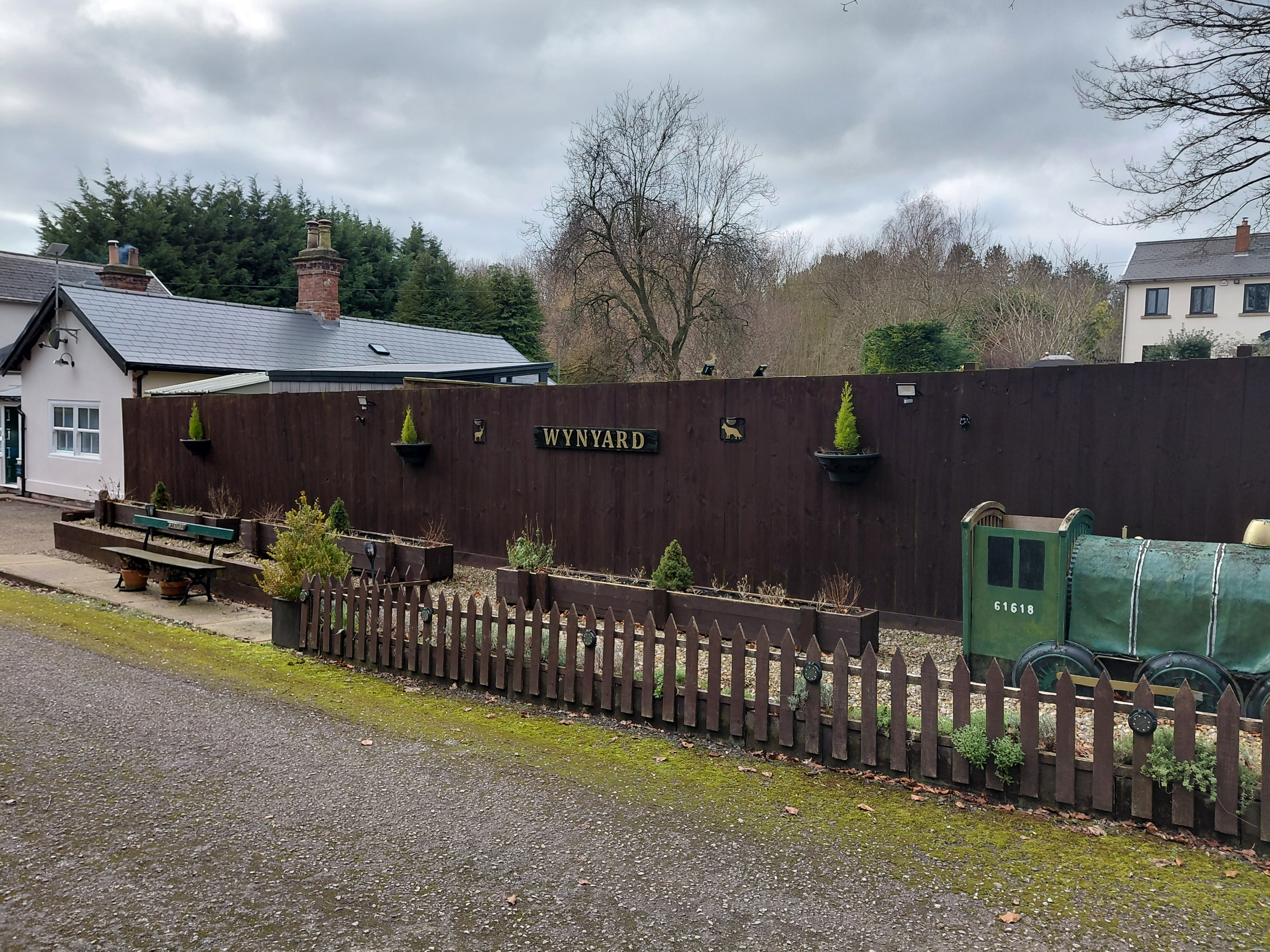
South west facing view of Wynyard Railway Station - County Durham

Wynyard railway station was a railway station on the Castle Eden branch of the North Eastern Railway (NER) from 1880 to 1931. It was located immediately to the south of the bridge carrying the Hartlepool to Sedgefield road (now part of the A689) and served little more than a few scattered hamlets, including Embleton and Swainston. Despite its name, the station was poorly situated for Wynyard Park which was better served by the neighbouring station at Thorpe Thewles.

== History ==
The NER gained powers in an act of Parliament to construct a line from Bowesfield Junction (where it joined the route of Stockton and Darlington Railway) to Wellfield Junction (on the route of the Hartlepool Dock and Railway) in 1872 and opened the line in stages, with the section north of Carlton Junction (where the line crossed the route of the Clarence Railway) opening to freight traffic on 1 August 1878 from which point Wynyard station was used for local goods traffic. However construction of the stations was not complete at this time. Local passenger trains were eventually introduced on 1 March 1880 though these services only ever used the line north of Carlton junction from where they continued over the former Clarence Railway route to Stockton-on-Tees station.

The station was of a standard design used by the NER during the 1870s. It had two platforms: the southbound platform, in the Stockton on Tees direction (on the east side of the tracks) had a small waiting shelter, while on the northbound (western) platform there was the station master's house, a waiting room and a canopied ticket office. There were also three goods sidings on the western side of lines serving, coal staiths (which had to be raised above the level of the platforms), a loading platform and a livestock paddock. A signal box was located a short distance south of the southbound platform until it was closed in 1953.

Passenger traffic on the line was always light, the line having been built primarily to allow freight to bypass the congested lines through Stockton and Hartlepool. Wynyard station's remote location served a sparsely populated area and in 1911 there were just 4,064 tickets issued at Wynyard station (this compares with 13,133 issued at Carlton station in the same year) however station was relatively well used for transporting agricultural produce with 922 tons of hay and clover and 199 wagons of livestock loaded at the station in 1913. Despite the poor patronage, there were four stopping passenger trains over the line per day in each direction in 1910 and the number increased to five each way by the 1930s.

There was an incident shortly before the First World War when the station master of Wynyard station, Mr George Dodds, discovered the dead body of the station master of the neighbouring station at Thorpe Thewles who is believed to have been murdered. Mr Dodds was a visiting railway relief clerk at the age of 23 at Thorpe Thewles station, as noted in the English Census returns for 1881. He became station master at Wynyard sometime after 3 April 1881, when the census was taken, until he retired in 1920, having replaced the original station master Mr Francis Carr when he was transferred to the neighbouring station at Hurworth Burn.

As part of the 1923 grouping, the NER became part of the London and North Eastern Railway (LNER). Passenger traffic remained low and consequentially, the LNER withdrew stopping passenger trains on 2 November 1931 from which point only goods were handled at Wynyard. Some express passenger trains did however continue to use the route. During the Second World War, the station was used as the disembarking point for wounded soldiers travelling to the emergency military hospital in Sedgefield to recover from their injuries.

After the war, the northbound track was, on several occasions, used to store surplus wagons, making the line only passable to southbound trains. Wynyard station was eventually closed completely on 2 April 1951 though the line was still used by mineral traffic until 6 July 1966.

After the line was closed and the tracks lifted, Wynyard Railway Station building and adjacent land was privately purchased and the old line purchased by the two local authorities whose areas it passed through, meaning that the line through Wynyard came under the control of Durham County Council who converted it into the Castle Eden Walkway cycle path (now part of the Wynyard Woodland Park).

Preceding station	Historical railways	Following station
Thorpe Thewles; Line and station closed	North Eastern Railway; Castle Eden Railway	Hurworth Burn; Line and station closed
