= Hurworth Burn railway station =

Railway station in County Durham, England (1880–1931)

Hurworth Burn
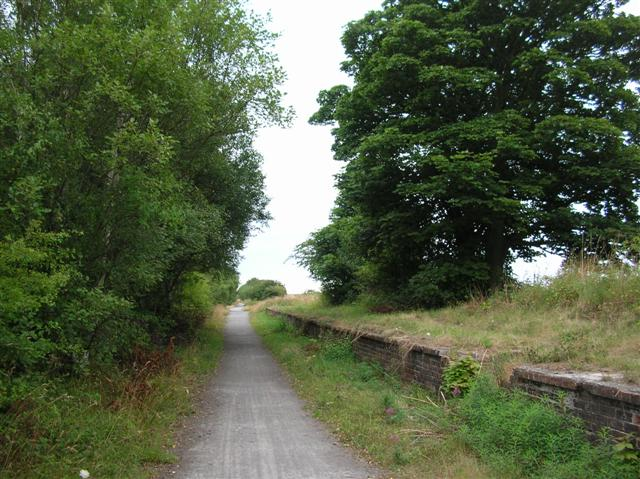
- The site of the station in August 2006.

General information
- Location: Hurworth Burn Reservoir, County Durham; England
- Coordinates: 54.6931°N 1.3661°W
- Platforms: 2

Other information
- Status: Disused

History
- Original company: North Eastern Railway
- Pre-grouping: North Eastern Railway
- Post-grouping: LNER

Key dates
- 1 August 1878: Station opened to goods
- 1 March 1880: Station opened to passengers
- 2 November 1931: Station closed to passengers
- 2 April 1951: Station closed completely
Location

Hurworth Burn railway station was a railway station on the Castle Eden branch of the North Eastern Railway (NER) from 1880 to 1931. It was located between the embankment carrying the railway over Hurworth Burn Reservoir (to the north) and the bridge carrying the line over the Hart to Trimdon road (known as Hurworth Burn Road) (to the south). As well as serving the then relatively new reservoir, the station primarily served a few scattered hamlets though it was also the nearest station to the village of Sheraton.

== History ==
The NER gained powers in an act of Parliament to construct a line from Bowesfield Junction (where it joined the route of Stockton and Darlington Railway) to Wellfield Junction (on the route of the Hartlepool Dock and Railway) in 1872 and opened the line in stages, with the section north of Carlton Junction (where the line crossed the route of the Clarence Railway) opening to freight traffic on 1 August 1878 from which point Hurworth Burn station was used for local goods traffic. However construction of the stations was not complete at this time. Local passenger trains were eventually introduced on 1 March 1880 though these services only ever used the line north of Carlton junction from where they continued over the former Clarence Railway route to Stockton-on-Tees station.

The station was of a standard design used by the NER during the 1870s. It had two platforms, both located on a raised embankment: the northbound platform (on the west side of the tracks) had a small waiting shelter while on the southbound (eastern) platform there was the station master's house, a waiting room, a canopied ticket office and, from 1906, a signal box. There were also three goods sidings on the eastern side of lines serving, coal staiths, a loading platform and a livestock paddock. The signal box had previously been located a short distance to the north of the northbound platform before it was relocated onto the southbound platform where it remained until it was closed in 1952.

Passenger traffic on the line was always light, the line having been built primarily to allow freight to bypass the congested lines through Stockton and Hartlepool. Hurworth Burn station's remote location served a sparsely populated area and in 1911 there were just 2,759 tickets issued at Hurworth Burn station (this compares with 13,133 issued at Carlton station in the same year) however station was more heavily used for transporting agricultural produce with 583 tons of hay and clover and 94 wagons of livestock loaded at the station in 1913. Despite the poor patronage, there were four stopping passenger trains over the line per day in each direction in 1910 and the number increased to five each way by the 1930s.

As part of the 1923 grouping, the NER became part of the London and North Eastern Railway (LNER). Passenger traffic remained low and consequentially, the LNER withdrew stopping passenger trains on 2 November 1931 from which point only goods were handled at Hurworth Burn. Some express passenger trains did however continue to use the route. After the Second World War, the northbound track was, on several occasions, used to store surplus wagons, making the line only passable to southbound trains. Hurworth Burn station was eventually closed completely on 2 April 1951 though the line was still used by mineral traffic until 6 July 1966.

After the line was closed and the tracks lifted, it was purchased by the two local authorities whose areas it passed through, meaning that the line through Hurworth Burn came under the control of Durham County Council who converted it into the Castle Eden Walkway cycle path.

Preceding station	Historical railways	Following station
Wynyard; Line and station closed	North Eastern Railway; Castle Eden Railway	Wellfield; Line and station closed
