= Polisse =

2011 film

- Theatrical release poster
- Directed by: Maïwenn
- Written by: Maïwenn; Emmanuelle Bercot
- Produced by: Alain Attal
- Starring: Karin Viard; Joeystarr; Marina Foïs; Nicolas Duvauchelle; Karole Rocher; Emmanuelle Bercot; Frédéric Pierrot; Arnaud Henriet; Naidra Ayadi; Jérémie Elkaïm; Maïwenn
- Cinematography: Pierre Aïm
- Edited by: Laure Gardette
- Music by: Stephen Warbeck
- Production company: Les Films du Trésor
- Distributed by: Mars Distribution
- Release dates: 13 May 2011 (Cannes); 19 October 2011 (France)
- Running time: 127 minutes
- Country: France
- Language: French
- Budget: $6.6 million
- Box office: $20.6 million

Polisse (released at some film festivals as Poliss, French pronunciation: [pɔˈlis]) is a 2011 French crime drama film written, directed by and starring Maïwenn. It also stars Joeystarr, Karin Viard, Marina Foïs, Nicolas Duvauchelle, Emmanuelle Bercot and Riccardo Scamarcio. The film centres on the Child Protection Unit (Brigade de Protection des Mineurs) of the Paris Police, and a photographer who is assigned to cover the unit. The title is derived from Maïwenn's son's misspelling of the word "police".

The film won the Jury Prize at the 2011 Cannes Film Festival and in 2012, received thirteen nominations in the 37th César Awards.

== Premise ==
The members of a Child Protection Unit police squad try to safeguard their mental health and home lives in the face of their stressful and disruptive work: tracking paedophiles, arresting parents suspected of mistreating their children, following pickpockets, runaways or those sexually exploited and helping in the protection of homeless little boys and girls and victims of rape.

During brief periods of relaxation, the squad gossip, quarrel, drink, dance; relationships are put under strain, break and are remade or newly made. Their boss is an ambitious and politically astute policeman, not wholly sympathetic to the demands of their consciences, and ready to tighten the leash if the suspect whom they are questioning has powerful friends. At the heart of the story is a hard-edged, bitter yet tender policeman (Joeystarr), and a photographer (played by director Maïwenn), whose assignment is to follow the squad in their work.

== Cast ==
- Karin Viard as Nadine
- Marina Foïs as Iris
- Joeystarr as Fred
- Nicolas Duvauchelle as Mathieu
- Maïwenn as Mélissa
- Riccardo Scamarcio as Francesco
- Karole Rocher as Chrys
- Emmanuelle Bercot as Sue Ellen
- Frédéric Pierrot as Balloo
- Arnaud Henriet as Bamako
- Naidra Ayadi as Nora
- Jérémie Elkaïm as Gabriel
- Wladimir Yordanoff as Beauchard
- Laurent Bateau as Hervé
- Carole Franck as Céline
- Marcial Di Fonzo Bo as P.E. teacher
- Anne Suarez as Alice
- Sandrine Kiberlain as Mrs. de la Faublaise
- Louis-Do de Lencquesaing as Mr. de la Faublaise
- Anthony Delon as Alex
- Audrey Lamy as Disgraced mother
- Sophie Cattani as The kidnapper mother
- Riton Liebman as Franck
- Lou Doillon as Mélissa's sister
- Alice de Lencquesaing as Sandra

== Production ==
Maïwenn got the idea for the film when she saw a documentary about the Child Protection Unit on television. She was allowed to stay with the officers of the unit to research the subject and get to know what kind of people they were. All the cases in the screenplay were based either on things the director had witnessed during her time with the unit or older cases they told her about. Not letting the viewers know the verdicts of the defendants was a conscious choice, because the police officers seldom get to know it either. Maïwenn wrote a first draft for the screenplay on her own, and was then joined by Emmanuelle Bercot.

The film was produced for €6.14 million through Les Films du Trésor in co-production with Arte France Cinéma and Mars Films. The production received pre-sales investment from Canal+ and CinéCinéma. Maïwenn only wanted to cast actors who would be credible in the roles of policemen: "In my opinion all of them had to have a common feature – they had to look like working class people and speak in vernacular Parisian French." Two former members of the CPU were hired to train the actors.

Filming took place in Paris between 30 August and 29 October 2010. The film was digitally recorded with two or three cameras in each scene. Editing took three months.

== Release ==
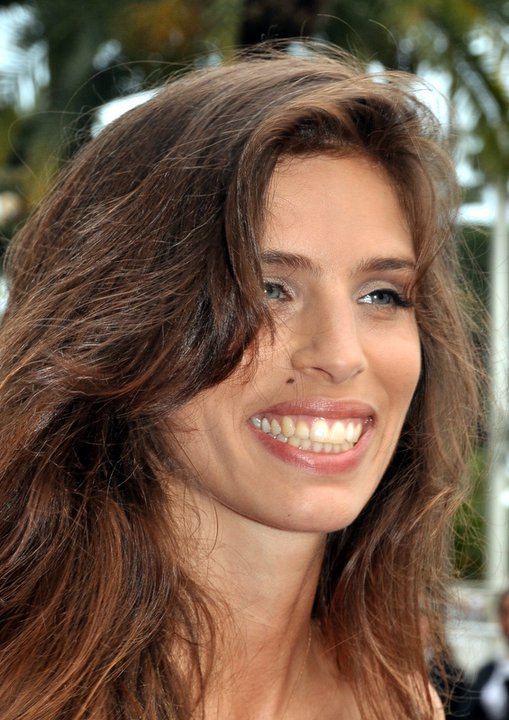
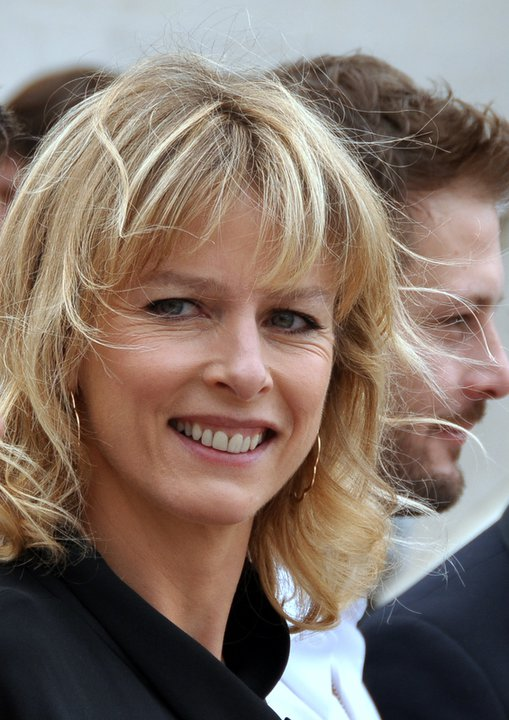
Maïwenn and Karin Viard at the Cannes Film Festival for the premiere of the film

The world premiere took place at the 2011 Cannes Film Festival, where the film was screened in the main competition on 13 May. The regular French release was on 19 October through Mars Distribution.

== Reception ==
The film was critically praised. Review aggregation website Rotten Tomatoes gives the film a score of 86% based on reviews from 85 critics, and an average rating of 6.8/10. The website's critical consensus states: "Polisse is a gripping and powerful procedural drama filled with fine acting and unflinching eye for truth and brutality". Metacritic assigned the film a weighted average score of 74 out of 100, based on 25 critics, indicating "generally favourable reviews".

At the Cannes Film Festival, Jordan Mintzer of The Hollywood Reporter compared the film to "a whole season of The Wire packed into a single two-hour-plus film, ... and even with its loose threads and frenzied structure, it convincingly jumps from laughter to tears and back again, never losing sight of the brutal realities at its core." In Screen Daily's review from the festival, Jonathan Romney called Maïwenn "undeniably a very strong director of actors, especially when it comes to the delicate scenes involving the various children. She's less adept, though, at judging what is dramatically essential and what is surplus to requirements". The film won the Cannes Film Festival's Jury Prize.

Peter Bradshaw from the Guardian newspaper was much less positive. He described the film as "a strong contender for the most awful film of the competition" and "much of it feels like a pretty dodgy evening in front of the television: less The Wire, more The Bill. But I don't think any director of The Bill would have permitted the toe-curlingly embarrassing overacting we get in this movie".

Peter Schöning, defined in his review for German Der Spiegel "Poliss(e)" as "a cry for help which became a film." ("Poliezei", das ist ein Film gewordener Hilferuf.) He added this was "not merely because of the abused children and young delinquents whose cases Maïwenn mentions in her film without showing pictures of them" (Nicht nur der kindlichen Missbrauchsopfer und jugendlichen Missetäter wegen, deren Fälle Maïwenn in ihrem Film zur Sprache bringt, ohne sie im Bild selbst vorzuführen.) but "as well because of those policemen who have to enforce the law but moreover have to perform a great deal of social work – hereby permanently being overstrained." (auch aufgrund jener Polizisten, die zwar der Strafverfolgung dienen, vor allem aber Sozialarbeit leisten – und dabei durchweg überfordert sind.) He concludes: "Despite all the ugly things told in this film Polisse has a beauty which derives from its pursuit of truthfulness." ("Poliezei" besitzt bei all dem Hässlichen, von dem der Film zu berichten hat, eine Schönheit, die aus seinem Streben nach Wahrhaftigkeit stammt). Spiegel Online supplemented this review by an in-depth interview with the film's director.
