= NER electric locomotives =

NER electric locomotives may refer to:

- British Rail Class EB1
- British Rail Class EE1
- British Rail Class EF1
- British Rail Class ES1

== See also ==
- NER electric units
