= Wynyard, County Durham =

Coordinates: 54.6252°N 1.3503°W

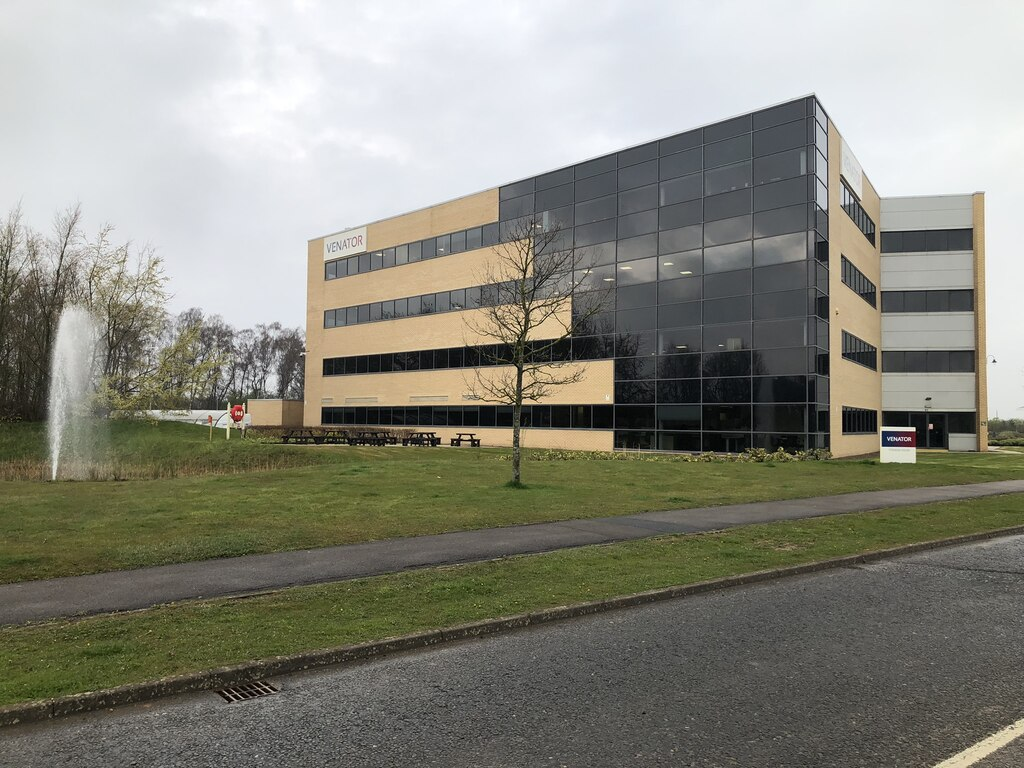
- Offices at the Wynyard business park

- Location in County Durham Location within County Durham
- Population: 4,289 (2021)
- OS grid reference: NZ425255
- Unitary authority: Stockton-on-Tees Hartlepool
- Ceremonial county: County Durham
- Region: North East
- Country: England
- Sovereign state: United Kingdom
- Police: Durham
- Fire: County Durham and Darlington
- Ambulance: North East
- UK Parliament: Hartlepool Stockton North

Wynyard is a garden village in County Durham, England.

It was designated a Garden Village by the government in 2020. Administratively, it is divided between the Borough of Stockton-on-Tees and the Borough of Hartlepool, with each containing a civil parish called "Wynyard".

Wynyard Estate has some of the most expensive houses in the North East, as well as the most expensive road in Teesside. Wynyard Park is a gated community, with multiple smaller gated communities within, the main one being the Manorside development, a collection of 27 self-built executive homes.

== History ==
Until the 1990s, the area now making up the village of Wynyard was the grounds of Wynyard Hall estate, owned by the Marquess of Londonderry. In 1987, the hall and its ground was bought by Sir John Hall, who decided to develop housing on the grounds of the estate, with the housing estates of Wynyard Village, Wynyard Woods and Wynyard Park being built.

Land north of the A689 in Wynyard, previously been used on a commercial basis by Samsung, was acquired in 2005 by Chris Musgrave, a Hartlepool businessman. It was developed into new housing and parkland. Wynyard Business Park was constructed on the eastern edge of Wynyard; a 2005 proposal to build a hospital there did not succeed and was scrapped in 2010.

== Governance ==
On 1 April 2019 the parish of Wynyard, Stockton-on-Tees was formed, with the former parish of Grindon divided into two parishes of Grindon and Thorpe Thewles and Wynyard.

Wynyard Parish Council (Hartlepool) was formed in May 2022; prior to its creation, the Hartlepool portion of Wynyard was in the civil parish of Elwick.

== Economy ==
On the eastern side of Wynyard is Wynyard Business Park, in which there is a Burger King, Starbucks, Sainsbury's, Co-op Wholesale, a barber shop called "Head-Quarters", a gym and a tanning salon.

== Transport ==
Wynyard is served by two main arterial roads: the A689 running east to west from Hartlepool to Bishop Auckland, and the A19 (north/south) leading to Middlesbrough and Stockton-on-Tees to the south and Tyne and Wear to the north.

Wynyard railway station was open from 1880 to 1931, serving the sparsely populated area before the construction of Wynyard village. After the line was closed and the tracks lifted, the line through Wynyard came under the control of Durham County Council who converted it into the Castle Eden Walkway cycle path, part of the Wynyard Woodland Park.

== Demographics ==
In the 2021 United Kingdom census, the population of Wynyard Parish, Hartlepool was 1,109. The population of Wynyard Parish, Stockton-on-Tees, was 3,180.

== Education ==
Wynyard has a primary school, Wynyard Primary School, which opened in 2015. A second Primary School will be built after a government U turn to allow it to go ahead.

== Sport ==
Wynyard has a golf club, Wynyard Golf Club, on Wellington Drive.

=== Golf Course ===
The course was built in 1996 alongside the building of the Wynyard Estates development and was designed by Martin Hawtree. In June 2019, a major redevelopment of Wynyard golf club was granted permission. The redevelopment includes a 150 bed luxury hotel and a sporting academy.

== Notable people ==
- Duncan Bannatyne, entrepreneur
- Tommy Miller, footballer
- Malcolm Christie, footballer
- Steve Baker, footballer
- Kevin Keegan, footballer
- Michael Gell, Forbes 30 under 30
- Alan Shearer, footballer
