= Thorpe Thewles =

Village in County Durham, England

Coordinates: 54°36′N 1°23′W

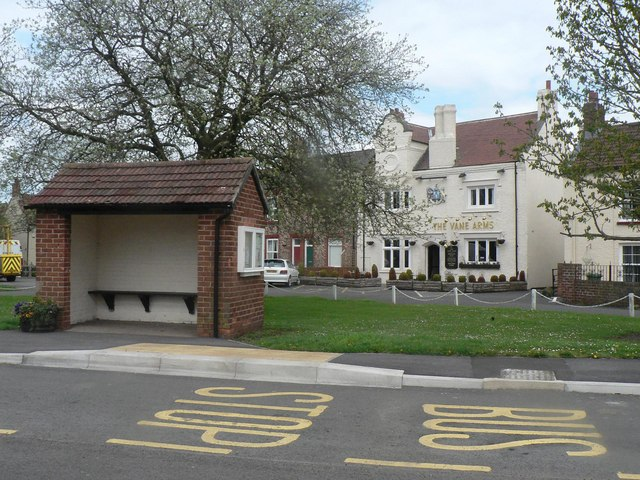
Thorpe Thewles' village green

Thorpe Thewles is a village which had history dating back to the 12th century. The village shares a parish with Grindon and is in the Borough of Stockton-on-Tees, County Durham, Northern England. It lies near the A177 road between Stockton-on-Tees and Sedgefield.

== Origin of the name ==
Thorpe is of Danish extraction and means farm, Thorp, and Thewles was likely the name of a family that possessed land here in the Middle Ages: the earliest occurrence of the full name is 'Thorpp' Thewles' in 1265. The surname Thewles probably comes from the Old English theawleas 'immoral', though the meaning of the placename is the Farm of the Thewles Family rather than, as sometimes reported, the Immoral Farm. The name has been confused as North Pewles when in translation.

== History ==
Galfried de Torp was a landowner in the mid-12th century. Members of the Thorp family donated land to the monks of Finchale Priory. The Fulthrope family occupied the manor from 1346 to 1629 while the Kendals, the Sedgewicks, the Tweddells and the Blackstones also owned land from the 16th to 18th centuries.

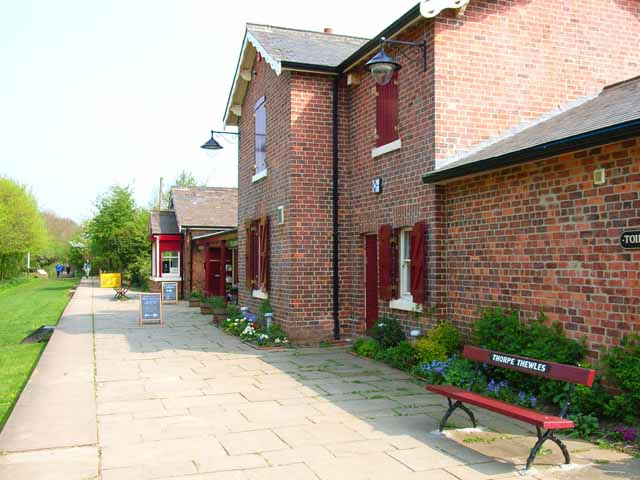
Thorpe Thewles' former railway station

Historic events include the earliest reference to Thorpe Thewles in 1265, the partial rebuilding of St Thomas Church (now a ruin) at Grindon in 1788, a school was built by the Marchioness of Londonderry in 1824, the Holy Trinity Church was built in 1849 but demolished in the 1880s, the railway viaduct was completed in 1877 and the station opened in 1882 and both the St James Church and the Wesleyan Methodist chapel were established in 1887.

== Present ==
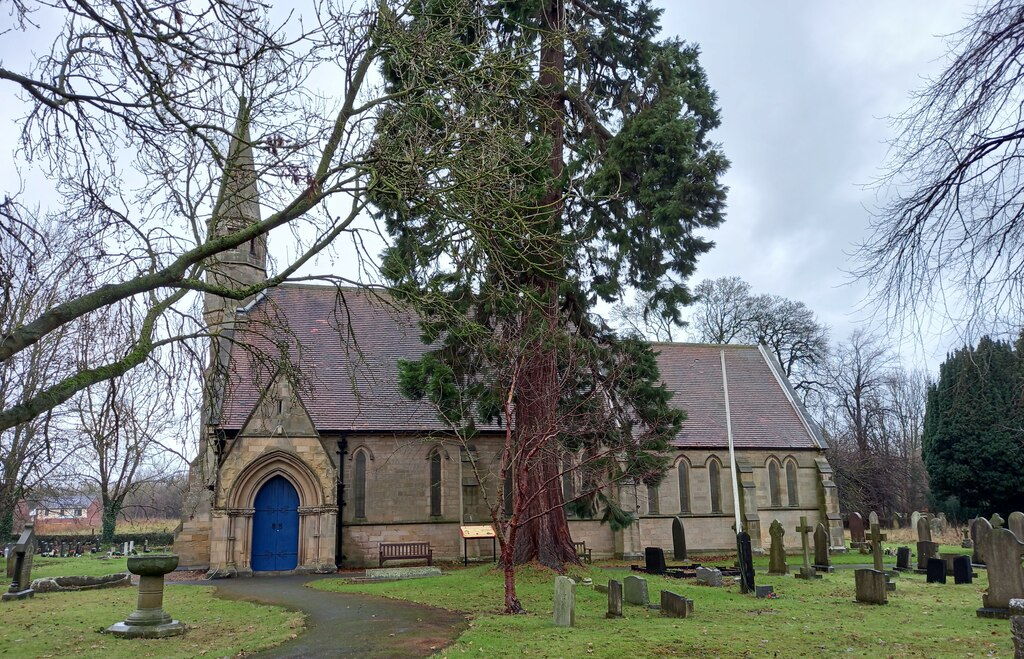
St James' Church

The village is currently made up of 182 households and a total population of 477 people. The village has a small children's play area, two public houses (the Vane Arms and the Hamilton Russell), a church (St James' Church) and a Parish hall. There is a planetarium, walkway and restaurant at Castle Eden Walkway, the site of the former Thorpe Thewles railway station of the former Castle Eden Railway

Historically, Thorpe Thewles was originally settled in 1692 with only two farmhouses and has grown to have more than 182 households today.

== Politics ==
Thorpe Thewles is located within the civil parish of Grindon and Thorpe Thewles, in the borough of Stockton-on-Tees in the Northern Parishes Ward and the Stockton North constituency. The Member of the UK Parliament for Thorpe Thewles is Alex Cunningham and the local councilor for Thorpe Thewles is John Gardner.
