= Questioning =

Questioning may refer to:

- Questioning (utterance), a request for information
- Interrogation, interviewing as commonly employed by law enforcement officers, military personnel, and intelligence agencies with the goal of eliciting useful information
- Scepticism, a state of uncertainty or doubt, or of challenging a previously held belief
- Questioning (sexuality and gender), a phase or period where an individual re-assesses their sexual orientation/identity and/or gender identity
- Socratic questioning (or Socratic maieutics), disciplined questioning that can be used to pursue thought in many directions and for many purposes

== See also ==
- Inquest, a judicial inquiry in common law jurisdictions, particularly one held to determine the cause of a person's death
- Query (disambiguation)
