= Grindon, County Durham =

Village in County Durham, England

Coordinates: 54.616°N 1.383°W

Grindon
- Village
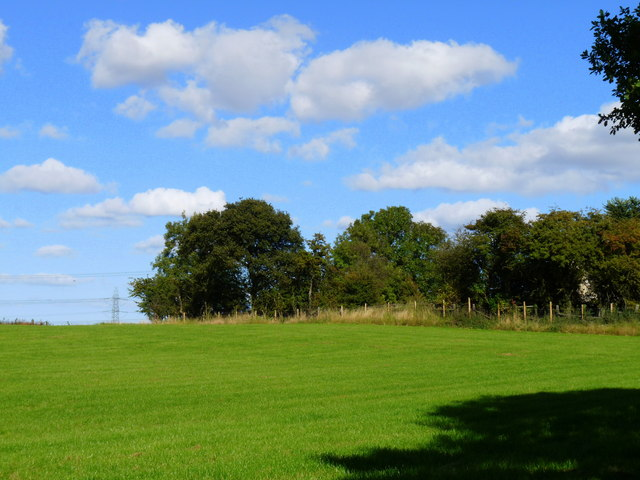

- Location within County Durham
- Population: 2,603
- OS grid reference: NZ 39923 24791
- Civil parish: Grindon and Thorpe Thewles
- Unitary authority: Stockton-on-Tees
- Ceremonial county: Durham
- Region: North East
- Country: England
- Sovereign state: United Kingdom
- Post town: Billingham
- Postcode district: TS22
- Police: Cleveland
- Fire: Cleveland
- Ambulance: North East
- UK Parliament: Stockton North

Grindon is a village and former civil parish, now in the parish of Grindon and Thorpe Thewles, in the Stockton-on-Tees district, in the ceremonial county of Durham, England. The civil parish population at the census 2001 was 2,603 reducing to 2,484 at the 2011 Census. In the 2021 census, the population of Grindon and Thorpe Thewles parish, now no longer including Wynyard, was 940. It is situated between Sedgefield and Stockton-on-Tees, near to Thorpe Thewles and Thorpe Larches.

The place name of "Grindon" is derived from the word 'dun', which meant hill. Grindon is situated in the Upland Fells, formed of Carboniferous millstone grit. "The alternating strata of harder and softer rocks give a stepped profile to many dale sides and distinctive flat-topped summits to the higher fells."

== History ==
In 1831 the parish of Grindon incorporated the townships of Grindon and Whitton. Whitton later moved to the parish of Stillington, two miles west of Grindon. In 1908 the parish boundaries of Grindon grew to include the township of Embleton from the neighbouring parish of Sedgefield. The parish was home to 4,275 acres of land, of which, 1,037 acres are home to agriculture, 1,927 under grass, while there are 845 acres of woods and plantations. The main agricultural outputs are wheat, oats and barley, all of which thrive due to the mix of magnesian, limestone and siltstone, unique to the North East region of England. Remains of the old church of St. Thomas of Canterbury are situated to the west of the Castle-Eden Walkway, now known as the Wynyard woodland park The church originates from the Norman age (1153–1193) and was dedicated to St Thomas a Becket in early 1200. The church was commissioned by the great grandson of William the Conqueror, Hugh de Puiset who was the Bishop of Durham (1153–1195) On 1 April 2019 the parish of Grindon was abolished and Grindon and Thorpe Thewles and Wynyard formed.

"It was part of the Bishop of Durham's scheme to keep revenue in the Bishopric which would have "pilgrimed" to Canterbury on one of the earliest "Package-Tours' Food, transport Accommodation and "Rep"s ' Geoffrey Chaucer wrote of such, in his "Canterbury-Tales"."

By the end of 1700 the church was a well established and managed part of the Grindon parish with well kept interior of wood panelling, box-pews and family pews. The walls in the church displayed funerary hatchments unique to local farming families belonging to the parish. However a steady population movement from Grindon to the village of Thorpe Thewles saw the need for a new church to be built to accommodate this growing population. The Church of Holy Trinity, was built in 1848, leaving the old church of St Thomas of Canterbury to degenerate into its current ruins. However, today the church stands as a historic relic and is a Grade A listed building

== Demographics ==
The population of Grindon has fluctuated and changed greatly over the past 150 years. It rose steeply between 1811 and 1830, only to rapidly decline until 1842, where it gradually increased to reach a peak in 1961. This decline was partially due to an outbreak of cholera throughout England, where 126 people died in 1832 around the Grindon parish. The current population stands at 2,603 according to the 2001 census data The 2001 census states that the majority of the population are aged between 25 and 44; a total of 820 people fall into this age bracket. There is only a small proportion of people aged 75 and over, a sum of 48 in the whole parish. The parish is situated next to the busy A177 road, used by commuters travelling to Teesside and Middlesbrough, which justifies the large portion of young people populating the parish. However, this has put pressure for expansion on the village, where there are concerns that the original character of Grindon will be lost, especially in villages such as Thorpe Thewles "which is of great archaeological interest and should be preserved for future generations".

Coal became an increasing and desirable source of energy in the 1800s, which also marked the beginning of the Industrial Revolution in Great Britain; it fuelled the expansion of the British Empire and manufacturing all over the country. Northern England was an essential player in this movement, in particular, areas such as County Durham which was home to vast supplies of coal, a resource which was exacerbated in the extreme. According to Home office statistics, there were 225 mines in Durham, with 72,272 workers, of whom 57,994 worked below the surface. Many of those workers originated from the Stockton-on-Tees area; this accounts for the population rise between 1842 and 1961 when coal mining was at its peak, attracting many working-class families from neighbouring areas The Chilton mine is the closest to the Grindon parish The most rapid era of population rise was after 1940, which resulted in the post-war baby boom in England. This period also saw the beginning of the National Health Service, established in 1948; these factors account for the rise in population and change in demographics as the countryside became increasingly desirable after the war.

== Occupational history ==
In 1831 the governing industrial output in Grindon was, unsurprisingly, agriculture, in particularly agricultural labouring, of which accounted for just under a third of employment for males aged twenty and over. Although slightly dominated by primary industry, parish level census statistics show that over 20% of employment was in the secondary sector, of which encompassed retail and handicraft businesses. Agricultural outputs fuelled growing towns and cities, with the growth of transport and new technologies agricultural goods could be transported to factories to be processed. For Grindon, this meant much of its agricultural outputs were sent to factories in Middlesbrough. One shining example of this is the newly established Quaker business in 1929, where business men bought plots of land in County Durham, including parts of the Grindon parish for agricultural use to supply resources to the ever-growing food industry. Statistics from the 1881 census data shows that the vast majority of employment and industry was in manual labour and production, both of which employed men as a majority. Women were far more involved in domestic services and offices.
