= Trans-Canada Advertising Agency Network =

The Trans-Canada Advertising Agency Network, or T-CAAN, is an association of 28 independent Canadian advertising agencies. The oldest and largest agency network in the country, it was founded in 1963 by seven member organizations.

T-CAAN-member agencies assist each other when specific client needs arise. T-CAAN also serves as a forum for member agencies to share ideas and best practices. It has close ties with similar groups in the U.S., the U.K., Japan, Jamaica, Europe and Hong Kong.

== Membership ==
To join T-CAAN, an advertising agency must be sponsored by a current member agency and elected by the membership at-large based on their “experience, expertise, security, integrity and community service.” Membership also has a regional basis, with all provinces and territories and most major Canadian cities represented in T-CAAN.

== Member agencies ==
Aasman Brand Communications, Whitehorse, YT
Acart Communications Inc., Ottawa, ON
BMR, Sault Ste. Marie, ON
Brown Communications Group, Regina, SK
Campbell Michener & Lee Inc., Toronto, ON
Colour, Halifax, NS
Copeland Communications Ltd., Victoria, BC
DDB Canada, Vancouver, BC
Elevator Strategy, Vancouver, BC
50 Carleton & Associates/Associés, Sudbury, ON
Generator Strategy Advertising, Thunder Bay, ON
Groupe Rinaldi Communication Marketing, Montreal, QC
Harris Marketing Communications, Windsor, ON
JAN Kelley Marketing, Burlington, ON
Kellett Communications Inc., Yellowknife, NT
LXB Communication Marketing, Quebec City, QC
The Marketing Den, Saskatoon, SK
Motum b2b, Toronto, ON
Pub Point Com, Montreal, QC
Quarry Integrated Communications, Waterloo, ON
Ragan Creative Strategy + Design, Kamloops, BC
stratégie Révolution strategy, Saint John, NB
Rose Country Advertising & Public Relations Ltd., Edmonton, AB
SPIRIT CREATIVE, Ottawa, ON
Surge Communications Inc., London, ON
TOTALGROUP Marketing Communications, St. John's, NL
Whitehead Inc., Toronto, ON
Zero Gravity Marketing, Calgary, AB
