= Quarrel =

Quarrel may refer to:

- Crossbow bolt, a crossbow's projectile also known as a quarrel
- Quarrel (James Bond), a James Bond character
  - Quarrel Jr., his son
- Quarrel (video game)
- The Quarrel, 1991 Canadian film
- Loki's Quarrel, a poem of the Poetic Edda

== See also ==
- Quarry (disambiguation)
