= Quarry Wood =

Quarry Wood may refer to:

- Quarry Wood, Hinstock
- Quarry Wood, Stockton-on-Tees
- Quarry Wood, Kent
