= British Rail Class EF1 =

Class of British electric locomotives

British Rail Class EB1 and EF1
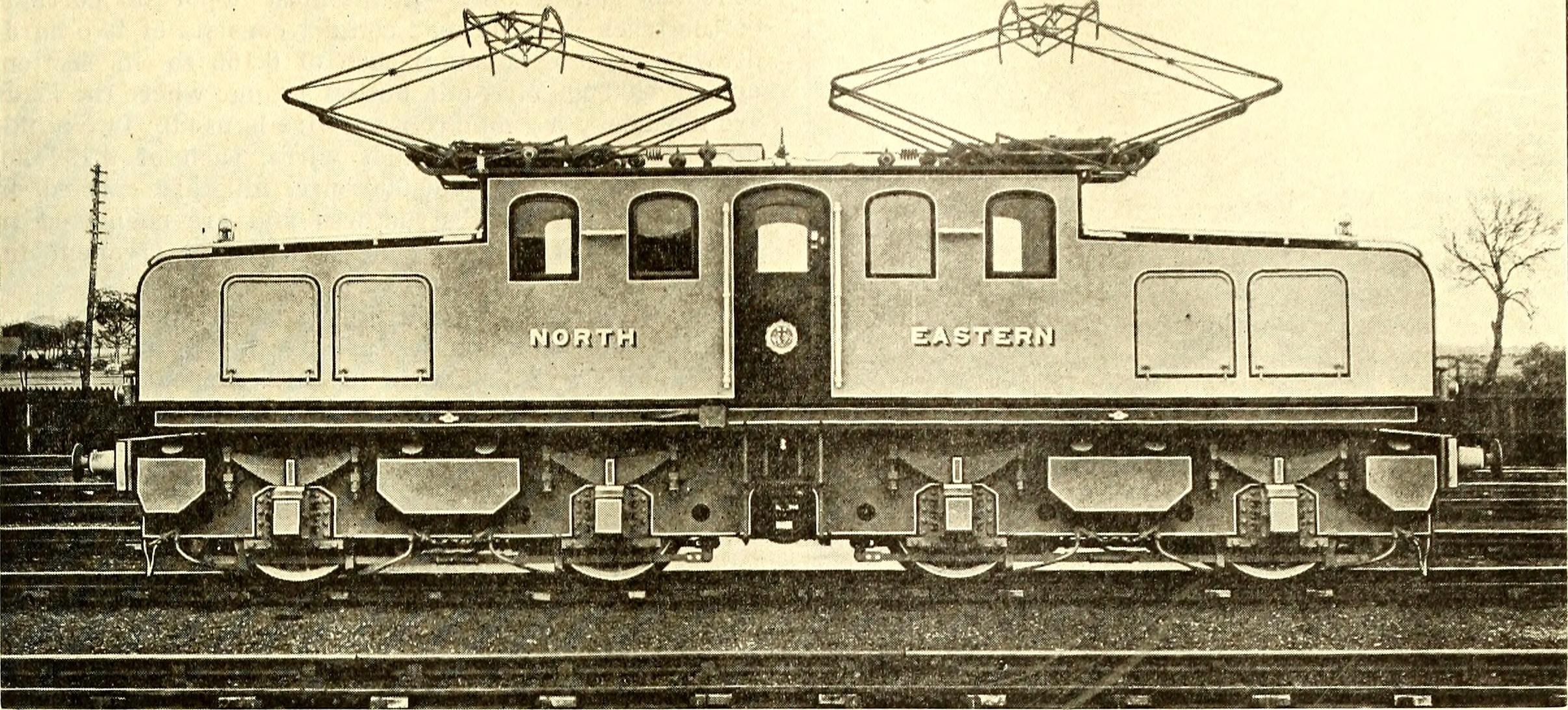
Type and origin
- Power type: Electric
- Builder: Darlington Works
- Build date: 1914–1919
- Total produced: 10
Specifications
- Configuration
  - AAR: B-B
  - Commonwealth: Bo+Bo
- Gauge: 4 ft 8 1/2 in (1,435 mm)
- Electric system/s: 1,500 V DC Catenary
- Current pickup(s): Pantograph
- Traction motors: 4 x 275 hp (205 kW), Siemens
Performance figures
- Power output: 820 kW (1,100 hp); No. 11 after 1942: 937 kW (1,256 hp)
Career
- Operators: North Eastern Railway; London and North Eastern Railway; British Railways
- Class: LNER and BR: EB1 and EF1
- Number in class: 10
- Numbers: NER: 3-12; LNER: 6490-6499; BR: 26502-26511
- Locale: North Eastern Region
- Retired: EF1, 1950–51; EB1, April 1964
- Disposition: All scrapped

The Class EF1 (Electric Freight 1) was a class of electrically powered locomotives built by the North Eastern Railway from 1914. They were built to haul coal trains from the mines at Shildon to the docks at Middlesbrough. In common with other LNER electric locomotives, no classification was given to these locomotives until 4 October 1945, when nos. 3-12 were all classified EB1 (Electric Banking 1) although only no. 11 was actually modified for banking. It was expected that all the locomotives would be similarly modified, but this did not happen, and the remaining locos were classified as EF1 (Electric Freight 1).

== Proposed diesel conversion ==
During the 1920s the coal traffic declined and some of the locomotives became surplus to requirements. In 1928 a plan was devised to convert one of them to a diesel-electric, using a 1,000 hp Beardmore diesel engine driving an English Electric generator. This plan did not come to fruition.

== Class EB1 ==
Electric traction on the Shildon line was discontinued in 1935 but the locomotives were retained for possible future use. Number 11 (later BR 26510) was rebuilt in 1941 for use as a banker on the Manchester-Sheffield line, and given the classification EB1 (Electric Banking 1). Horsepower was increased from 1,100 to 1,256 and the twin pantographs were replaced by a single central one. In October 1945, all ten locomotives were classified as Class EB1. Although only one had been rebuilt, it was expected that rebuilding of the others would follow. Nos. 3-12 were renumbered as Nos. 6490-9 in the LNER's 1946 renumbering scheme. After nationalisation in 1948 they were renumbered again as 26502-11. In 1949, the plan to convert the remaining nine locomotives as banking engines was dropped and they were reclassified as Class EF1 (Electric Freight 1).

== Final years ==
The EF1s were withdrawn in 1950–51. In 1949, the EB1 (number 26510) was moved to Ilford Depot (Eastern Region) for use as a shunter. Number 26510 was transferred to departmental stock (as No. 100) in 1959 and withdrawn in 1964. None of the locomotives were preserved.

== See also ==
- Castle Eden Railway
- Clarence Railway
- Erimus Marshalling Yard
