= Quarry (surname) =

Quarry is a surname. Notable people with the surname include:

- Bobby Quarry (born 1962), American boxer, youngest brother of Jerry and Mike Quarry
- Jerry Quarry (1945–1999), American heavyweight boxer
- Mike Quarry (1951–2006), American light heavyweight boxer, brother of Jerry Quarry
- Robert Quarry (1925–2009), American actor
