= John Hall (English businessman) =

British businessman, born 1933

Sir John Hall DL
- Born: 21 March 1933 (age 93); Ashington, Northumberland, England
- Occupations: Property developer Sports-team owner
- Political party: Reform UK
- Other political affiliations: Conservative (before June 2024)
- Children: 2

Sir John Hall DL (born 21 March 1933) is a property developer in North East England. He is also life president and former chairman of Newcastle United Football Club.

== Biography ==
The son of a miner, Hall was born and brought up in North Seaton, Ashington, Northumberland, and he attended nearby Bedlington Grammar School until 1949. Before starting his own business career, he worked in the mining industry as a surveyor.

In the 1980s, after Hall and his wife visited the Eaton Centre in Toronto, Canada and the West Edmonton Mall in Alberta, Canada, Hall's company, Cameron Hall Developments, masterminded the construction of the MetroCentre shopping mall in Dunston, Gateshead.

Hall acquired Wynyard Hall in May 1987. Wynyard Golf Club was opened in 1995.

Hall was knighted in the 1991 Birthday Honours.

Hall's company bought Woolsington Hall, northwest of Newcastle, in 1994. Hall had planned several developments of the site, including a football academy and a luxury hotel with golf course. In 2002, the hall was added to English Heritage's Heritage at Risk Register and, as of 2021, is vacant following fire damage and requiring full restoration.

In April 2010, Hall announced that he was suffering from inoperable prostate cancer and was about to embark on a course of intensive chemotherapy. As of February 2011, the cancer was being kept under control by medication, and Hall was concentrating on his final project, a £2.5-million rose garden at his Wynyard Park estate, which Hall purchased as a country estate and developed it into a hotel with housing developments.

On 10 February 2011, at a ceremony at the Shipley Art Gallery, Hall and his wife were given the freedom of Gateshead for their services to leisure, retail, business and sport.

== Newcastle United Football Club ==
Hall began his ownership of the team by taking over Newcastle United in a bitter battle for control and appointing Kevin Keegan as manager in February 1992. Keegan turned the club's fortunes around, taking the team from the brink of relegation from the Second Division, to almost winning the Premier League just four years later. He also financed the world record signing of striker Alan Shearer as well as re-signing local hero Peter Beardsley and making other major signings including Andy Cole, Les Ferdinand, David Ginola and Faustino Asprilla.

After taking over Newcastle United, Hall announced his intention to create a "sporting club" along similar lines to multi-sport institutions in Europe such as FC Barcelona. To this end he also bought the Newcastle Falcons (rugby union), the Newcastle Eagles (basketball), and the Durham Wasps (ice hockey) in 1995. The Wasps were subsequently moved to Sunderland's Crowtree Leisure Centre. They were renamed the Newcastle Cobras when they moved to Newcastle Arena the following season.

Hall planned to build a new rugby, football and ice-skating stadium at Leazes Park but the scheme was rejected after a 38,000-signature petition against it was organised by local residents. Instead, he continued the redevelopment of St. James' Park, Newcastle United's stadium, where the Leazes End stand is now the Sir John Hall Stand. Although he proved very popular with the club's fans, questions as to whether his involvement with Newcastle United was anything other than profitable opportunism have been raised.

In 1997, Hall passed chairmanship of the club to Freddy Shepherd and his family interests in the club to his son, Douglas. He then sold his entire 41.6% shareholding to sports retail magnate Mike Ashley for £55 million on 23 May 2007, valuing the club at £133.1 million.

== Politics ==
Hall has donated more than £500,000 to the Conservative Party, and helped to fund Theresa May's snap general election in 2017. In May 2017 he gave £25,000 to the Conservative Party. In February 2018, he expressed disapproval over what he described as May's indecisiveness about Brexit and her lack of domestic policies. In June 2024, Hall appeared at a Reform UK election rally in Durham, where he announced his support for the party.
