= Quarry (company) =

Marketing communications agency headquartered in St. Jacobs, Ontario

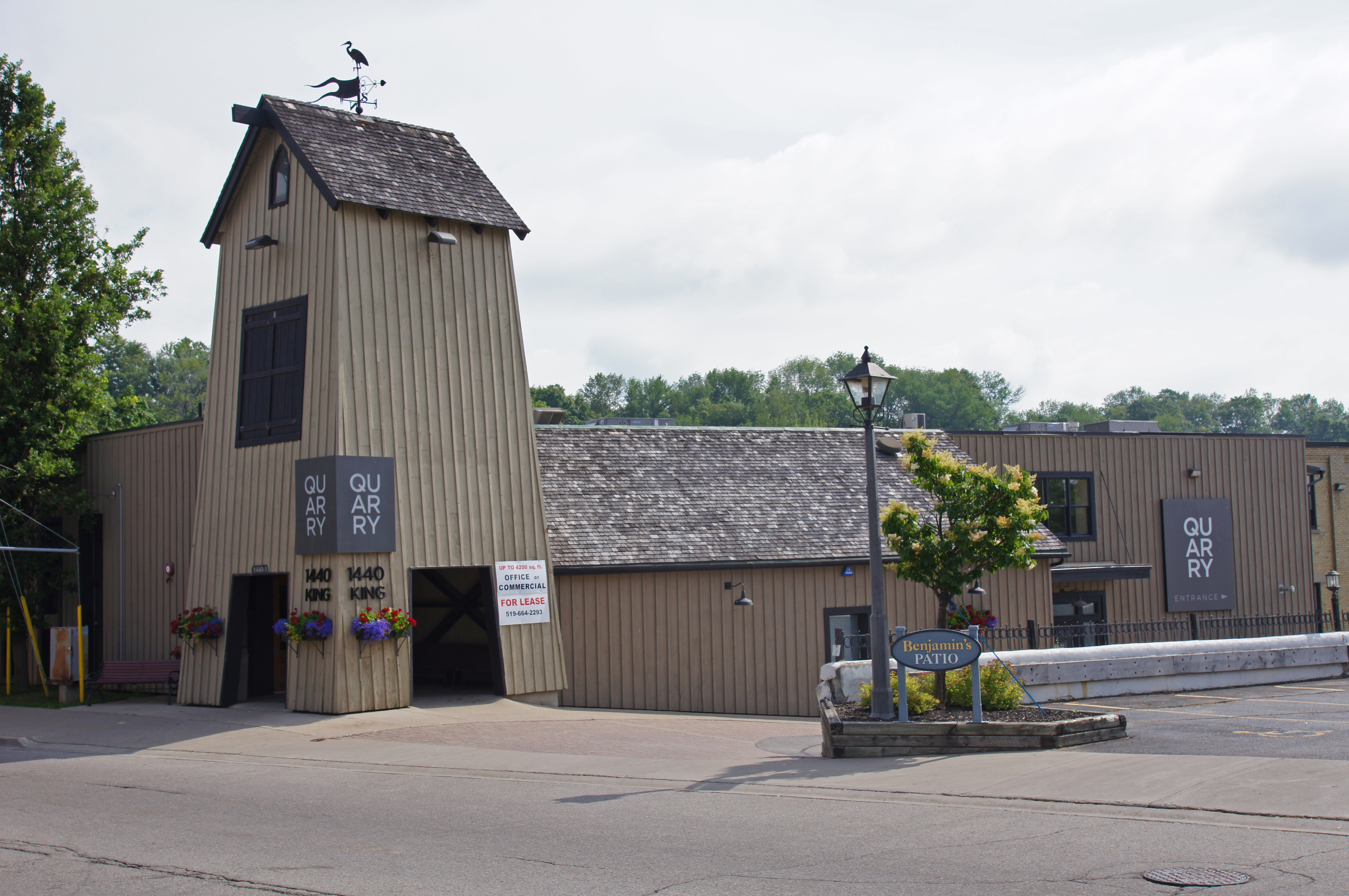
- Headquarters in St. Jacobs, Ontario
- Company type: Privately held
- Industry: Integrated Marketing Communications; Advertising
- Founded: Kitchener, Ontario (1973)
- Founder: Robert M. Quarry
- Headquarters: 1440 King Street North; St. Jacobs, Ontario, Canada
- Area served: Worldwide
- Key people: Alan Quarry (Chair); Ken Whyte (President); Tony Mohr (COO); Glen Drummond (CIO)
- Number of employees: 90
- Website: Quarry.com

Quarry (formerly Quarry Integrated Communications) is a privately held marketing communications and advertising agency headquartered in St. Jacobs, Ontario, Canada. Quarry employs approximately 100 people in its headquarters and its locations in Durham, North Carolina and San Jose, California, USA.

Quarry was an early adopter and is a leading practitioner of Integrated Marketing Communications (IMC). Quarry's offering includes customer experience marketing, and it has been cited as a leader in the field of personas development by Forrester Research. Quarry's services include strategic insight and research, branding, advertising, public relations, marketing automation, sales force support and Web and digital media.

== History ==
Robert M. Quarry founded the company in Kitchener, Ontario, Canada in 1973. In 1988, his son Alan Quarry became the company's major shareholder and the company relocated to nearby Waterloo, Ontario the following year. The company expanded through growth and mergers to include companies that specialized in advertising (R.M. Quarry Advertising), visual design (Accelerate Design, Ratchford Design), database marketing (dBasics), interactive design (Interchange) and technical documentation (Quintext). In 1998, the company opened its first office in the United States, a year that also saw the separate operating companies merge into one.

In 2008, Quarry celebrated its 35th anniversary. To mark the occasion, the organization hosted the annual E3 European Agency Network conference, the first such event held outside of Europe. Quarry is also a member of the Trans-Canada Advertising Agency Network and a certified agency partner of marketing automation company Eloqua.

In July 2010, Quarry relocated its headquarters from Waterloo to St. Jacobs, Ontario. In 2012, Quarry received the Innovation Award from the Greater Kitchener Waterloo Chamber of Commerce for its involvement in establishing and housing the Felt Lab, a joint project with the University of Waterloo to foster digital media research.

In 2013, Quarry was named B2B Agency of the Year in MarketingProfs' Bright Bulb B2B Awards.

Quarry is currently led by a four-person partnership with Alan Quarry serving as Chair and Ken Whyte as President.

== The Quarry Builder System ==
Quarry uses its trademarked Demand Builder process to develop marketing campaigns for its clients.

The four-step methodology that underpins the Demand Builder harnesses insight into the customer to create has also been adapted for use in 1) online traffic generation, 2) customer-relationship nurturing, 3) sales-force readiness and 4) digital product design. These methodologies are called the Traffic Builder, Relationship Builder, Sales Builder and Design Builder, respectively, and collectively constitute the Builder System.

== Clients ==
Quarry's clients market highly engineered products, typically in the healthcare, financial services and technology sectors.
