= Cleveland County Council =

Former local authority in north east England

- Coat of arms

Type
- Type: Non-metropolitan county

History
- Founded: 1 April 1974
- Disbanded: 31 March 1996
- Succeeded by: Hartlepool; Stockton-on-Tees; Middlesbrough; Redcar and Cleveland

Elections
- Last election: 1993

Meeting place
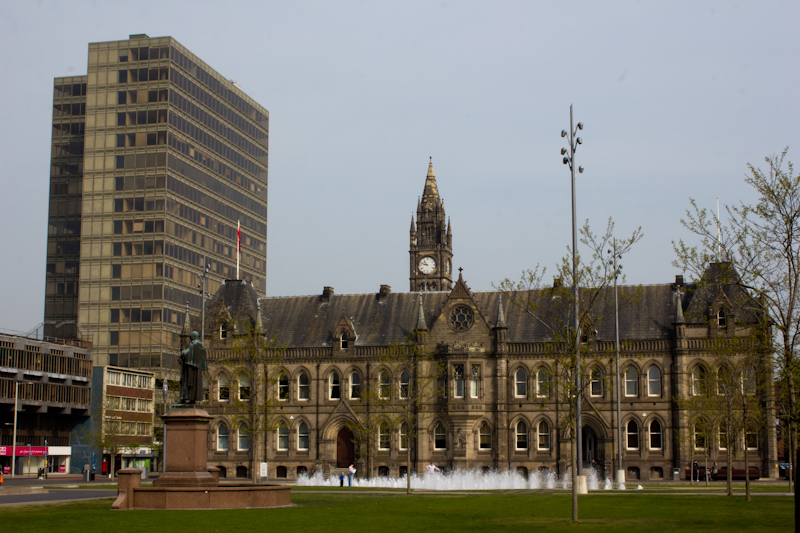
- Municipal Buildings, Middlesbrough

Cleveland County Council was the county council of the non-metropolitan county of Cleveland in north east England. It came into its powers on 1 April 1974 and was abolished on 31 March 1996.

== History ==
The county council came into its powers on 1 April 1974 and established its base at Municipal Buildings in Middlesbrough. It adopted the motto "Endeavour" to commemorate the name of Captain James Cook's ship, HMS Endeavour, which, in February 1768, was dispatched on a mission to find the postulated continent Terra Australis Incognita (or "unknown southern land") in the south Pacific.

Following the recommendations of the Banham Commission, which had recommended the transfer of power in the county to unitary authorities, the county council was abolished on 31 March 1996. It was replaced with four unitary authorities: Hartlepool, Stockton-on-Tees, Middlesbrough and Redcar and Cleveland. The four districts were re-allocated to the ceremonial counties of County Durham (Hartlepool and north Stockton) and North Yorkshire (south Stockton, Middlesbrough and Redcar & Cleveland) so facilitating the abolition of the ceremonial county of Cleveland as well as the abolition of the administrative county of Cleveland.

== Political control ==
The first election to the council was held in 1973, initially operating as a shadow authority before coming into its powers on 1 April 1974. Political control of the council from 1974 until its abolition in 1996 was held by the following parties:

Party in control	Years
Labour	1974–1977
Conservative	1977–1981
Labour	1981–1996

=== Leadership ===
The leaders of the council were:

Councillor	Party	From	To
Maurice Sutherland	Labour	1 Apr 1974	May 1977
Arthur Pearson	Conservative	May 1977	May 1981
Maurice Sutherland	Labour	May 1981	May 1985
Bryan Hanson	Labour	May 1985	May 1989
Paul Harford	Labour	May 1989	31 Mar 1996

== Council elections ==
- 1973 Cleveland County Council election
- 1977 Cleveland County Council election
- 1981 Cleveland County Council election
- 1985 Cleveland County Council election
- 1989 Cleveland County Council election
- 1993 Cleveland County Council election
