= Thorpe Larches =

Hamlet in County Durham, England

Coordinates: 54.628°N 1.399°W

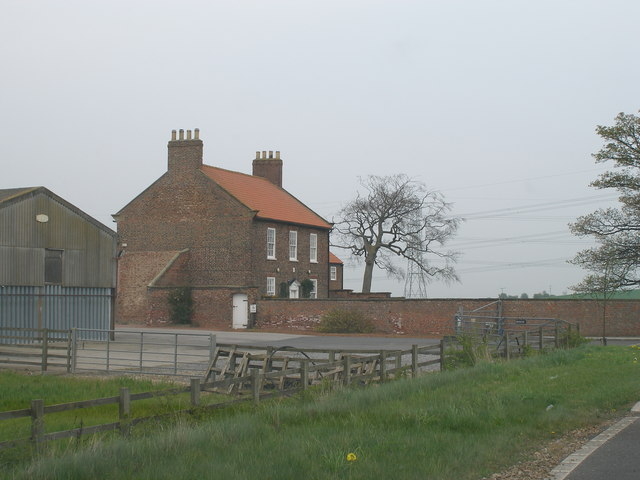
- Green Hill Farm

- Location within County Durham
- Population: 60 approx
- OS grid reference: NZ388260
- Civil parish: Sedgefield
- Unitary authority: County Durham
- Ceremonial county: County Durham
- Region: North East
- Country: England
- Sovereign state: United Kingdom
- Post town: STOCKTON-ON-TEES
- Postcode district: TS21
- Police: Durham
- Fire: County Durham and Darlington
- Ambulance: North East

Thorpe Larches is a small hamlet in County Durham in North East England, situated between Sedgefield and Stockton-on-Tees. There are approximately 21 buildings, 19 of which are houses, and the other two a car garage and a packaging warehouse. The hamlet has around 60 residents.

The village is within catchment range of at least one primary school and one secondary school.

Nearby towns include:

- Stockton-on-Tees
- Billingham
- Middlesbrough
- Darlington
- Yarm
- Sedgefield
