= NER electric units =

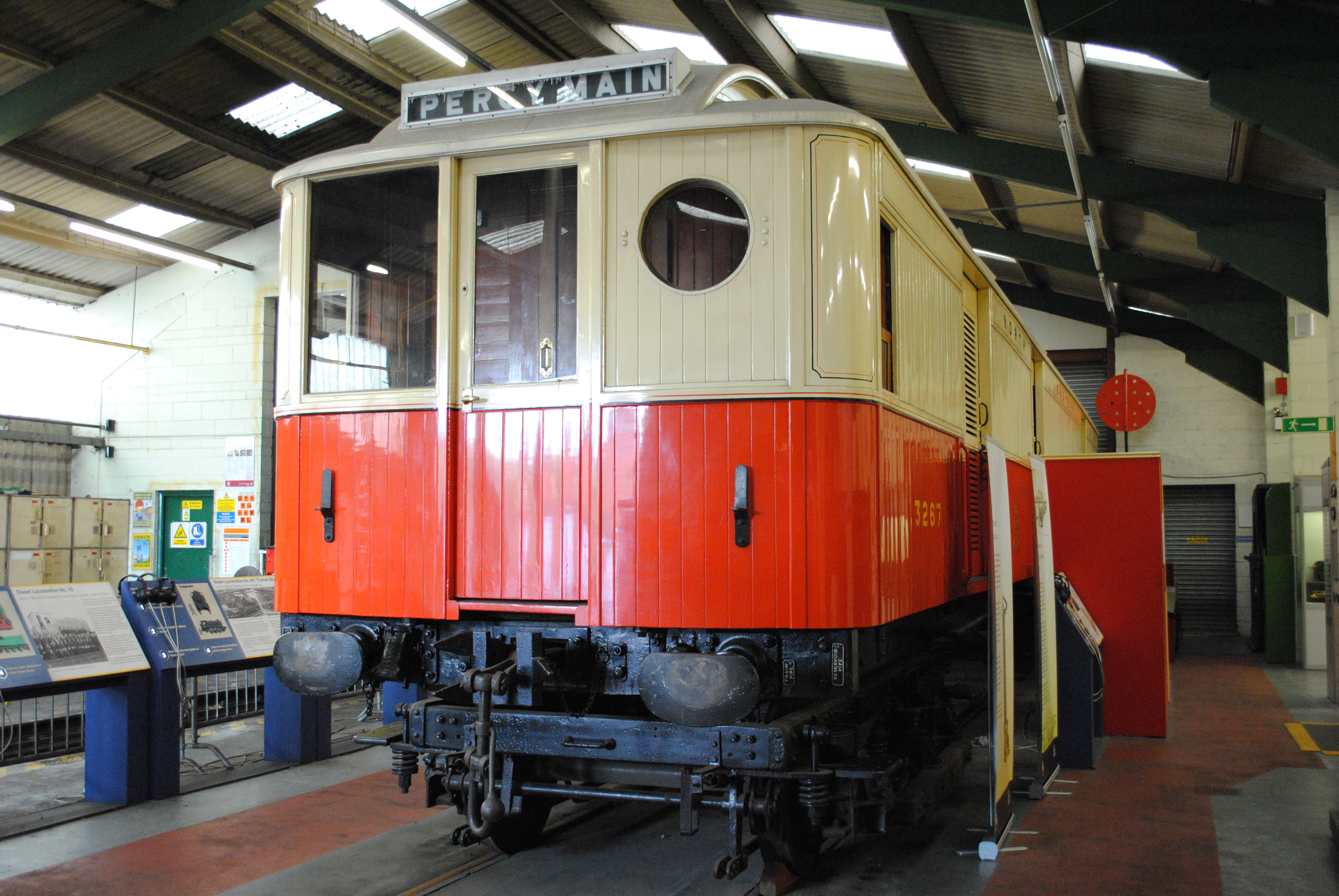
- Preserved 1904 NER electric Motor Parcel Van No. 3267 in the Stephenson Railway Museum
- In service: 1904–1938; 1920-1955
- Manufacturer: York Works; British Thomson-Houston
- Constructed: 1904–15; 1920–28
- Scrapped: 1962
- Number preserved: 1 parcel van
- Operators: North Eastern Railway; London and North Eastern Railway; British Railways
- Depots: Walkergate

Specifications
- Traction motors: 2 x 125 hp (93 kW); 2 x 140 hp (100 kW)
- Electric system(s): 600 V DC third rail
- Current collection: Contact shoe
- Coupling system: Buffers and chains/custom Cowhead couplings
- Track gauge: 4 ft 8 1/2 in (1,435 mm) standard gauge

The NER electric units were electric multiple units that ran on the Tyneside Electrics, a suburban system based on the English city of Newcastle upon Tyne. In 1904 the North Eastern Railway electrified suburban services on Tyneside with a third rail at 600 V DC and built saloon cars that ran in 3-car to 8-car formations. More cars were built between 1908 and 1915 to cope with increased traffic. In 1918, a fire at Walkergate car shed destroyed 34 cars and replacement cars were built in 1920.

In 1938, to allow the extension of electrification to South Shields, the 1904–15 stock was replaced by the LNER electric units. The 1920 stock was refurbished and operated the South Shields service until 17 May, 1955 when they were replaced by British Rail built Class 416 units.

As of July 2012 one of the parcel vans built in 1904 is in the National Railway Museum collection and on loan to the Stephenson Railway Museum.

== Service ==
In 1904 the North Eastern Railway electrified suburban services on Tyneside. Equipment for 102 electric multiple units was bought from British Thompson-Houston (BTH), 56 motor cars with two 125 horsepower (93 kW) motors, two motor parcel vans and 44 trailers. (Note: According to Marsden 2008, p. 62, whereas the LNER Encyclopedia only lists 88 cars, omitting 12 single cab driving trailers.) The cars, built in NER's own workshops at York, were saloons with clerestory roofs, (Note: A clerestory roof has a raised centre section with small windows and/or ventilators.) and painted red and cream. These normally ran in 3-car formation, but eight-car trains were seen. The parcel vans were used with passenger coaches on morning and evening workman's trains. The line was electrified with a third rail at 600 V DC, and the first trains ran on 29 March 1904 between Newcastle New Bridge Street railway station and Benton. Services were running to the Tynemouth coast and back to Newcastle on 25 July 1904. A short link between Manors railway station and New Bridge Street opened on 1 January 1909, completing a circular route.

Twenty-two passenger cars and a parcel van were built between 1908 and 1915 to cope with increased traffic. On 3 March 1913, an empty stock train was in a rear-end collision with one of the units due to a signalman's error. Forty-nine people were injured. In 1918 a fire at Walkergate car shed (Note: The LNER Encyclopedia calls this Heaton car shed.) destroyed 34 cars; steam locomotives and carriages were temporarily employed. In 1920, 34 new cars were built to replace those lost; these had elliptical roofs and 140 horsepower (100 kW) motors, and another parcel van was built in 1921. On 7 August 1926, one of the electric trains overran signals and collided with a freight train at Manors station. The driver had tied down the controls with a handkerchief. This allowed the train to continue its journey after he leant out of the train and was killed as it passed under a bridge. Following the collision, a replacement motor car was built in 1928.

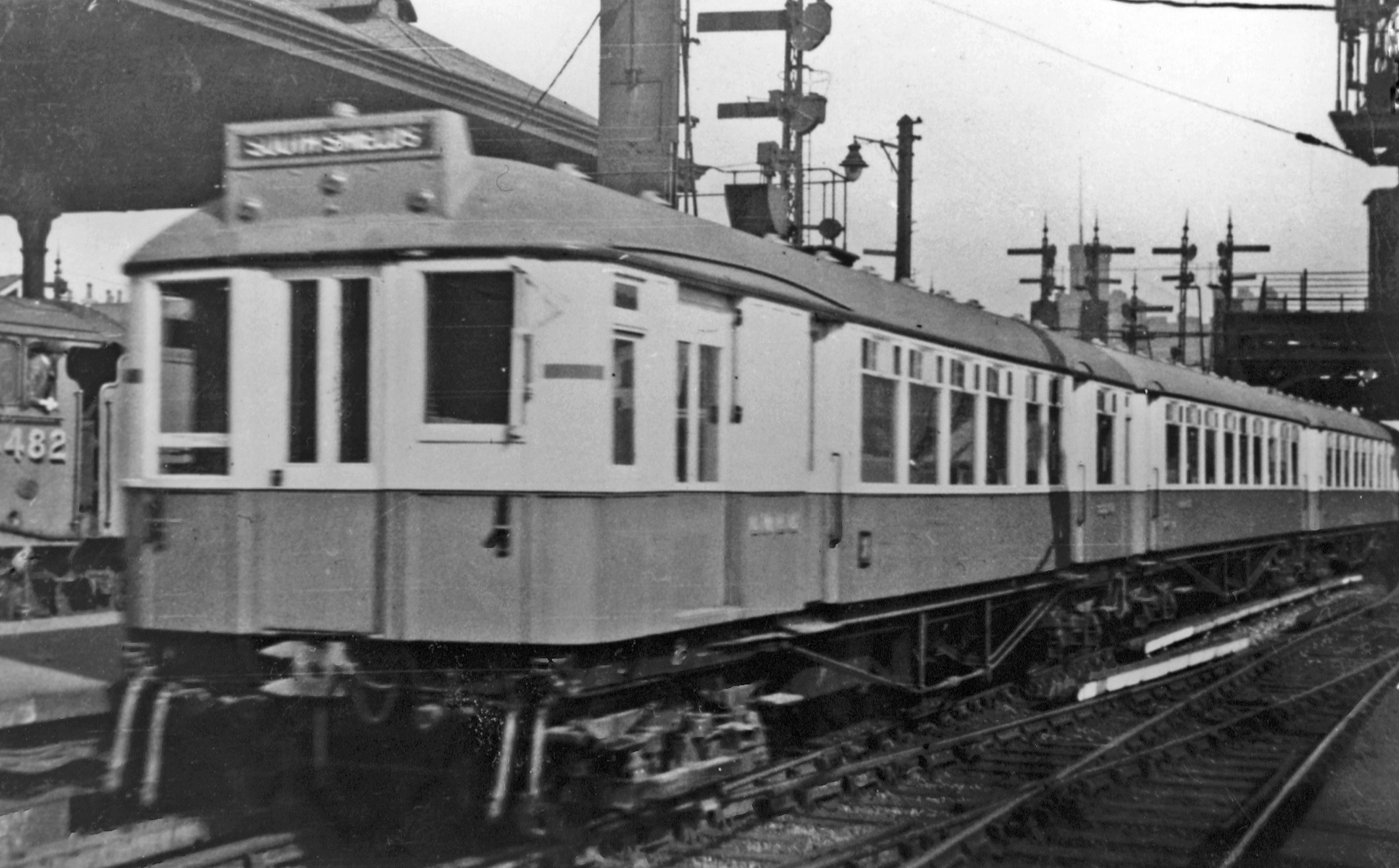
A 1920-built South Tyneside electric unit at Newcastle Central station in 1938. One of the units built to replace those destroyed in the 1918 depot fire.

To allow the extension of electrification to South Shields in 1938, the 1904–15 stock was replaced by the LNER Tyneside electric units and the 1920 stock refurbished, a new motor car built at York and 18 two-car sets formed. These operated the South Shields service until 17 May 1955 when they were replaced by British Rail built Class 416 units. Three trailers that had been converted to take prams on summer weekends continued until 1962.

The two 1904 parcel vans were converted into deicing vans and withdrawn in 1966. As of July 2023, one of these vans is in the National Railway Museum collection and on loan to the Stephenson Railway Museum.

== See also ==
- NER electric locomotives

== Notes and references ==
=== Bibliography ===
- Earnshaw, Alan (1993). Trains in Trouble: Vol. 8. Penryn: Atlantic Books. ISBN 0-906899-52-4.
- Hoole, Ken (1982). Trains in Trouble: Vol. 3. Redruth: Atlantic Books. ISBN 0-906899-05-2.
- Jackson, Alan (1992). The Railway Dictionary: An A-Z of Railway Terminology. Sutton Publishing. ISBN 07509-00385.
- Marsden, Colin J. (2008). The DC Electrics. Ian Allan. ISBN 978-0-86093-615-2.
