= Quarry Wood, Stockton-on-Tees =

Nature reserve in Preston-on-Tees, County Durham, England

Coordinates: 54.531°N 1.339°W

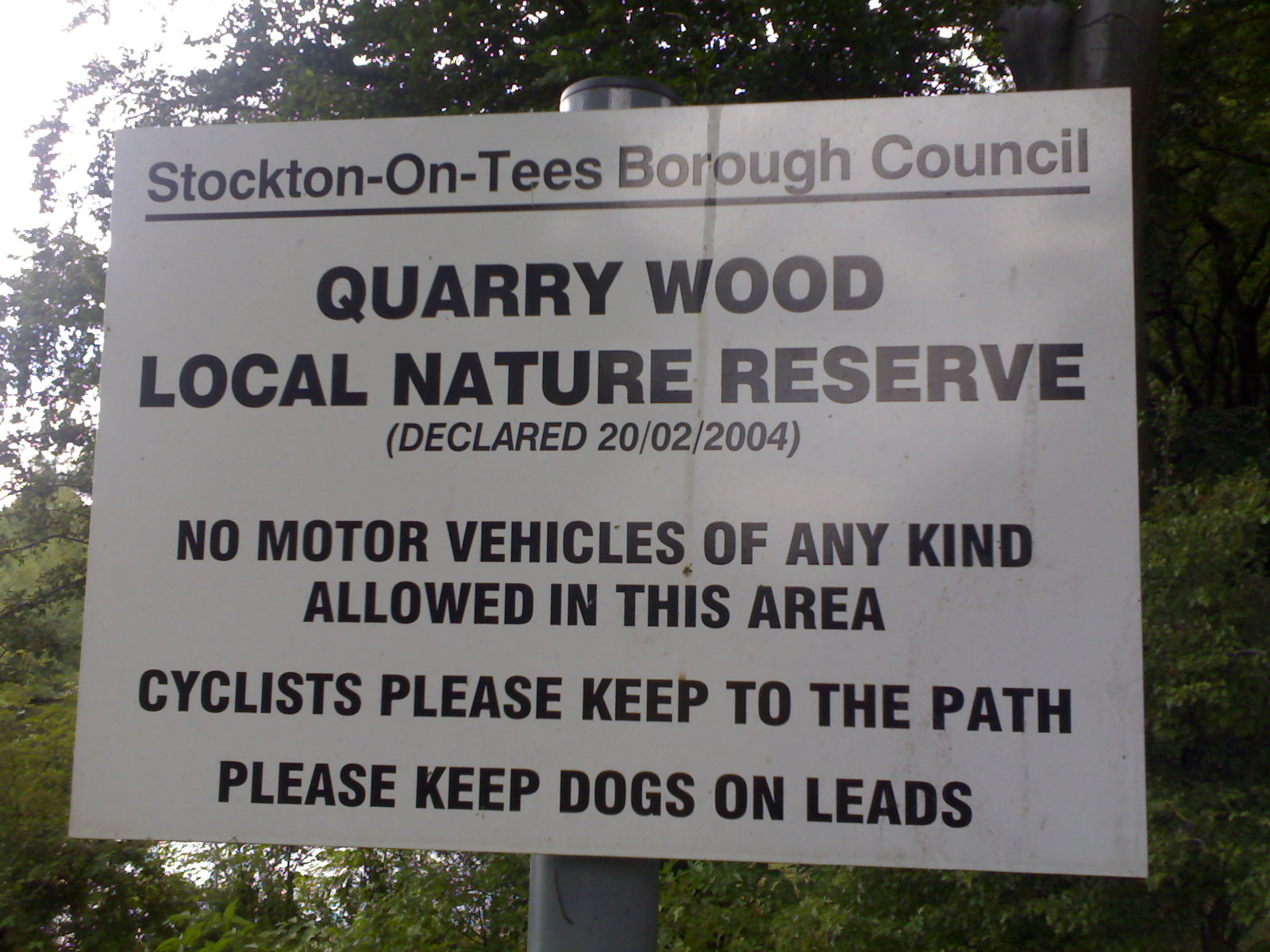

Quarry Wood is a small wooded area in Preston Park, Preston-on-Tees in County Durham, England. It was declared a Local Nature Reserve in 2004 by Stockton Borough Council.

The geography of the site is that of a large hole with banked sides leading to a small pond at the bottom and is densely populated with mature trees. The River Tees is to the East of the wood.

As the name suggests the site was a Victorian Whinstone quarry from the 1820s to 1850s. The pond is where the main mine shaft was located, and although the depth of the pond is not known it is believed to be no more than 10m deep. The pond is not connected to the River Tees due to the impermeable nature of Whinstone.

It is now a popular destination for aspiring younger mountain bikers, with the natural terrain providing ample features to ride. Preston Park itself is currently going through re-development work, and is expected to re-open fully in Summer 2012.
