= Castle Eden Railway =

Railway line in County Durham, England

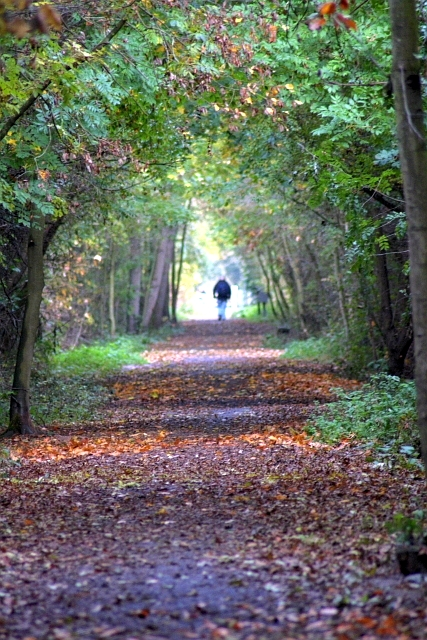
View along the Castle Eden Walkway, October 2009

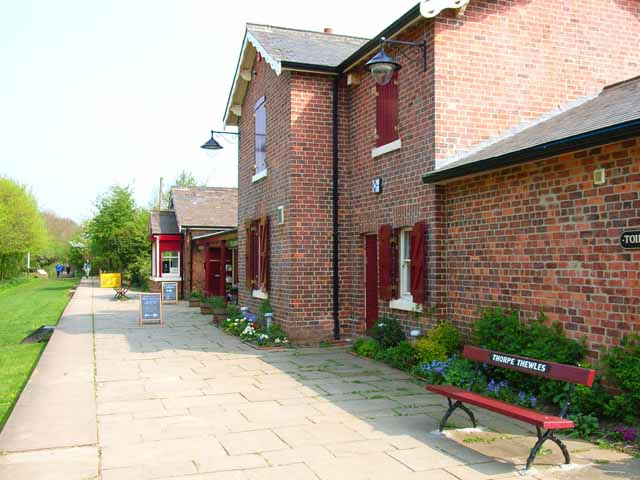
The old stationmasters house at Thorpe Thewles, which opened as a Visitor Centre in 1983

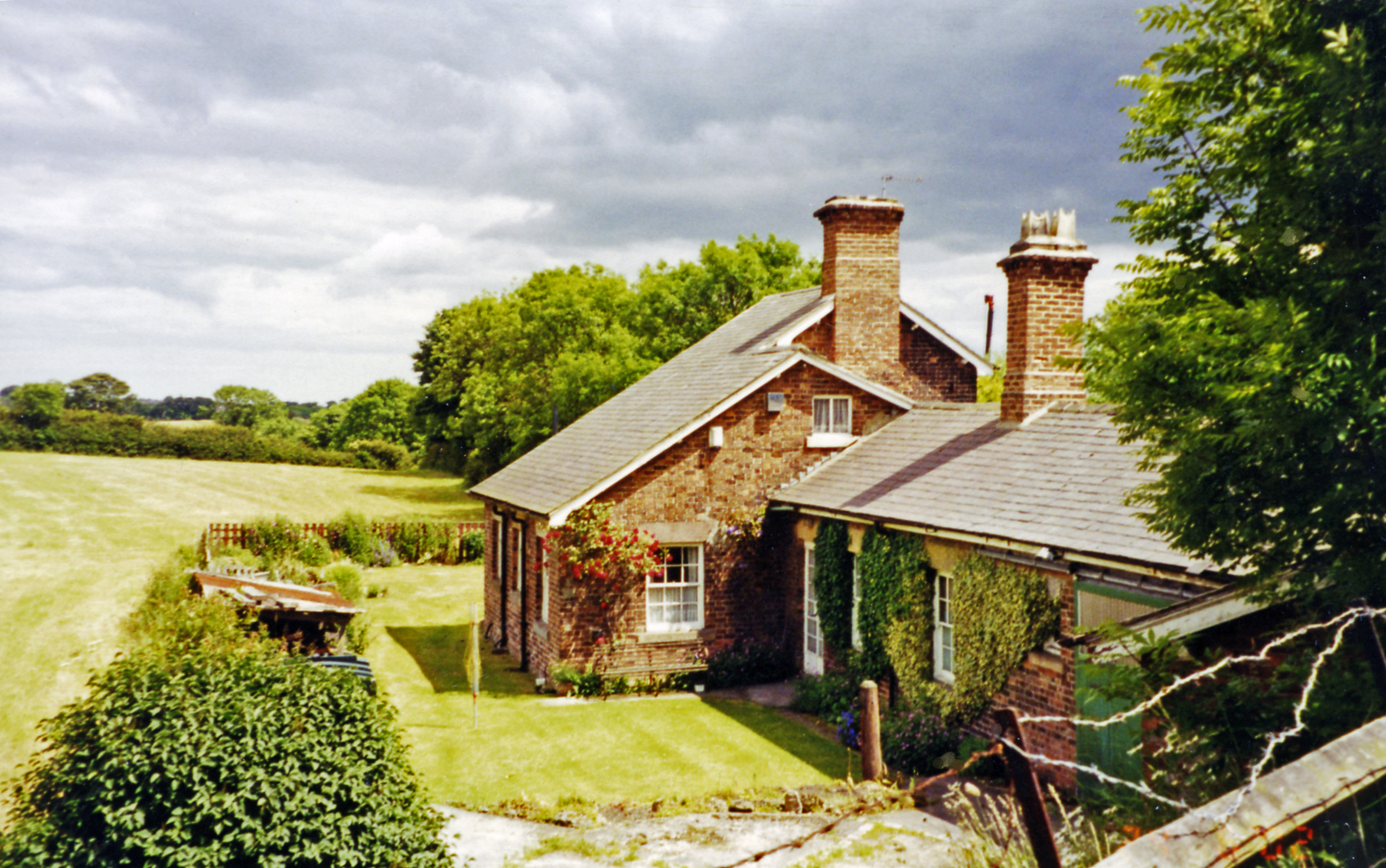
The former Castle Eden station; despite the name, the Castle Eden Railway never served this station

The Castle Eden Railway was a railway line built by the North Eastern Railway between Bowesfield Junction near Stockton-on-Tees and Wingate, County Durham, Northeast England. Its route never actually reached Castle Eden (which was accessed from its Wingate terminus via the Hartlepool Dock and Railway), and it was also informally known as the "Cuckoo Line".

== Authorisation ==
Passed under an act of parliament as the Stockton and Castle Eden Bridge Railway, it was built by contractor Thomas Nelson. The main civil engineering structure was the viaduct at Thorpe Thewles to cross Thorpe Beck and its valley, which consisted of 22 arches, used 8 million bricks and cost £37,000.

== Opening ==
The first section of the line was opened on 1 May 1877 between Bowesfield Junction to Carlton South Junction (later Redmarshall), with a curve to Carlton West, to give access to the coalfields of South County Durham. The remainder of the line was opened for freight traffic on 1 August 1878, and passenger traffic between Stockton and Wellfield on 1 March 1880. A curve connecting the line with the Leeds Northern Railway between Bowesfield Junction and Hartburn West Junction was added in 1901.

== Electrification ==
The southern section from Bowesfield to Redmarshall never carried passengers, but in 1914 was overhead line electrified by the NER to allow coal to be transported from Witton Park Colliery at Shildon, along the former Clarence Railway to Redmarshall and then down the CER to Erimus Marshalling Yard, for export from Middlesbrough Dock. During the 1920s the coal traffic declined, and some of the Electric Freight 1 locomotives became surplus to requirements. After the NER was grouped in 1923 as part of the London and North Eastern Railway, by the 1935 the LNER had replaced the electric locomotives with steam. A curve connecting with the Leeds Northern Railway between Bowesfield Junction and Hartburn West Junction was added in 1901.

== Traffic ==
Originally proposed as a secondary mainline, it mainly carried freight, including: Weardale limestone; West County Durham coal; and Cleveland ironstone to support the growing industrialisation on Teesside. Its secondary transport was the shipment of agricultural supplies in and produce/livestock out from the valleys farms.

== Decline and closure ==
In 1905 the Durham Coast Line between Sunderland and Hartlepool was completed, which started the decline of the importance of the Castle Eden Branch as an express passenger mainline. In 1931 it lost its passenger services, and it closed to freight services in 1951. Its final demise even as a bypass route occurred as a result of the Beeching Axe review, closing in stages between 1966 and 1968. The track, ballast and other equipment were all removed by contractors soon afterwards.

== The site today ==
In 1977 part of the line was acquired by Cleveland County Council with financial help from the Department of the Environment and the Countryside Commission. In 1979 the viaduct was demolished to make the Thorpe Thewles bypass. The residual section reopened to the public as the Castle Eden Walkway in 1981, while the old stationmasters house at Thorpe Thewles was opened as a Visitor Centre in 1983.
