= Query =

In general, a query is a form of questioning, in a line of inquiry.

Query may also refer to:

== Music ==
- "Query?", a 2025 track by Toby Fox from Deltarune Chapters 3+4 OST from the video game Deltarune

== Computing and technology ==
- Query, a precise request for information retrieval made to a database, data structure or information system
  - Query language, a computer language used to make queries into databases and information systems
  - Query string, in the World Wide Web, an optional part of a URL
  - Web search query, a query entered by users into web search engines
- Command-query separation (CQS), a concept in object-oriented programming, especially in the Eiffel programming language
- jQuery, a lightweight JavaScript library that emphasizes interaction between JavaScript and HTML

== People with the name ==
- Jeff Query (born 1967), an American football player
- Nate Query, a musician

== Other uses ==
- Query (complexity), a mapping from structures of one vocabulary to structures of another vocabulary
- Query (publishing), document(s) sent to literary agents in a standardised format by authors requesting representation
- Query (Quaker), a question used for reflection and spiritual exercises among members of the Society of Friends
- The Queries, a set of 31 questions outlined by Isaac Newton beginning in 1704

== See also ==
- Queue (disambiguation)
