= Borough of Stockton-on-Tees =

Unitary authority area in County Durham and North Yorkshire, England

- Unitary authority area and borough
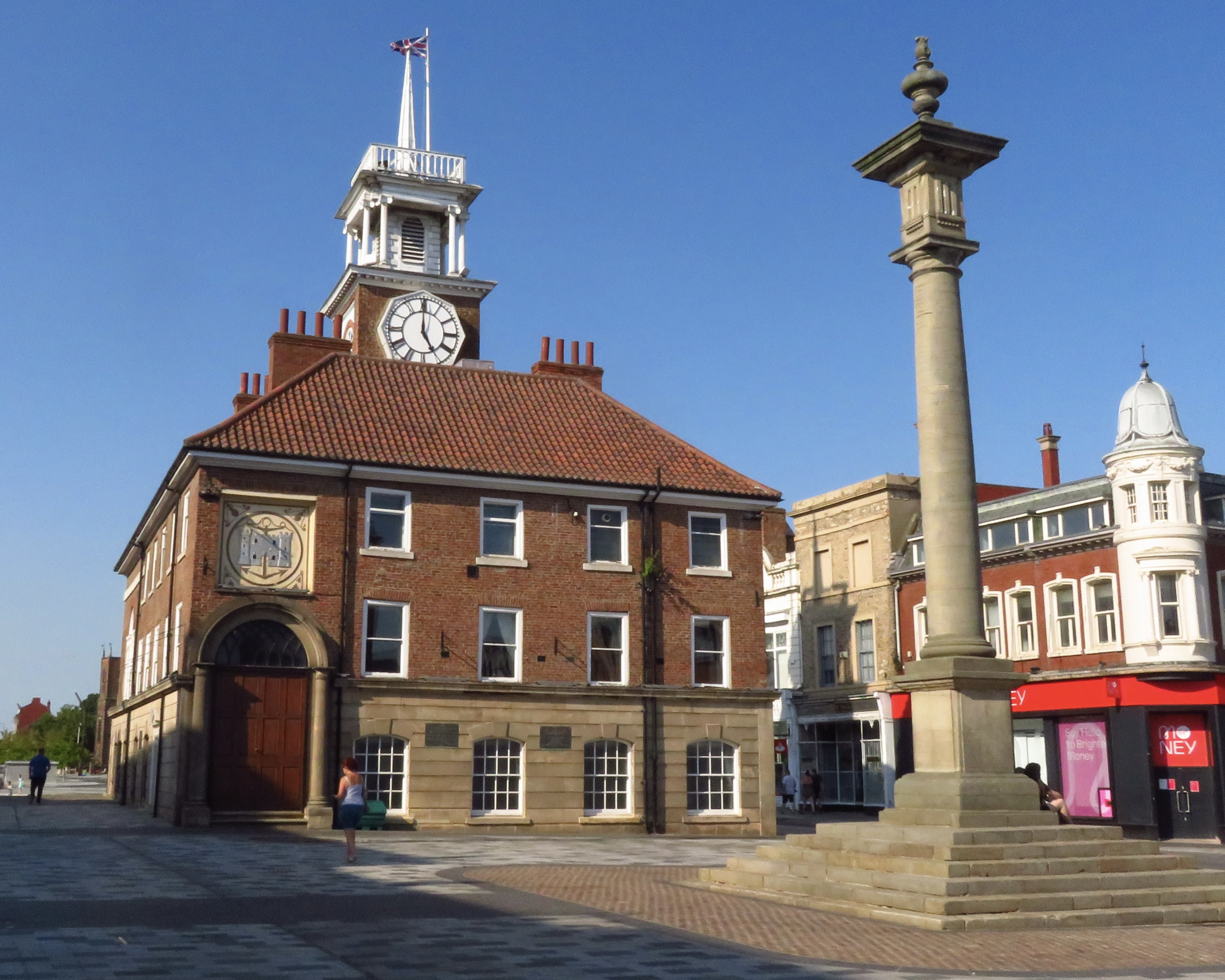
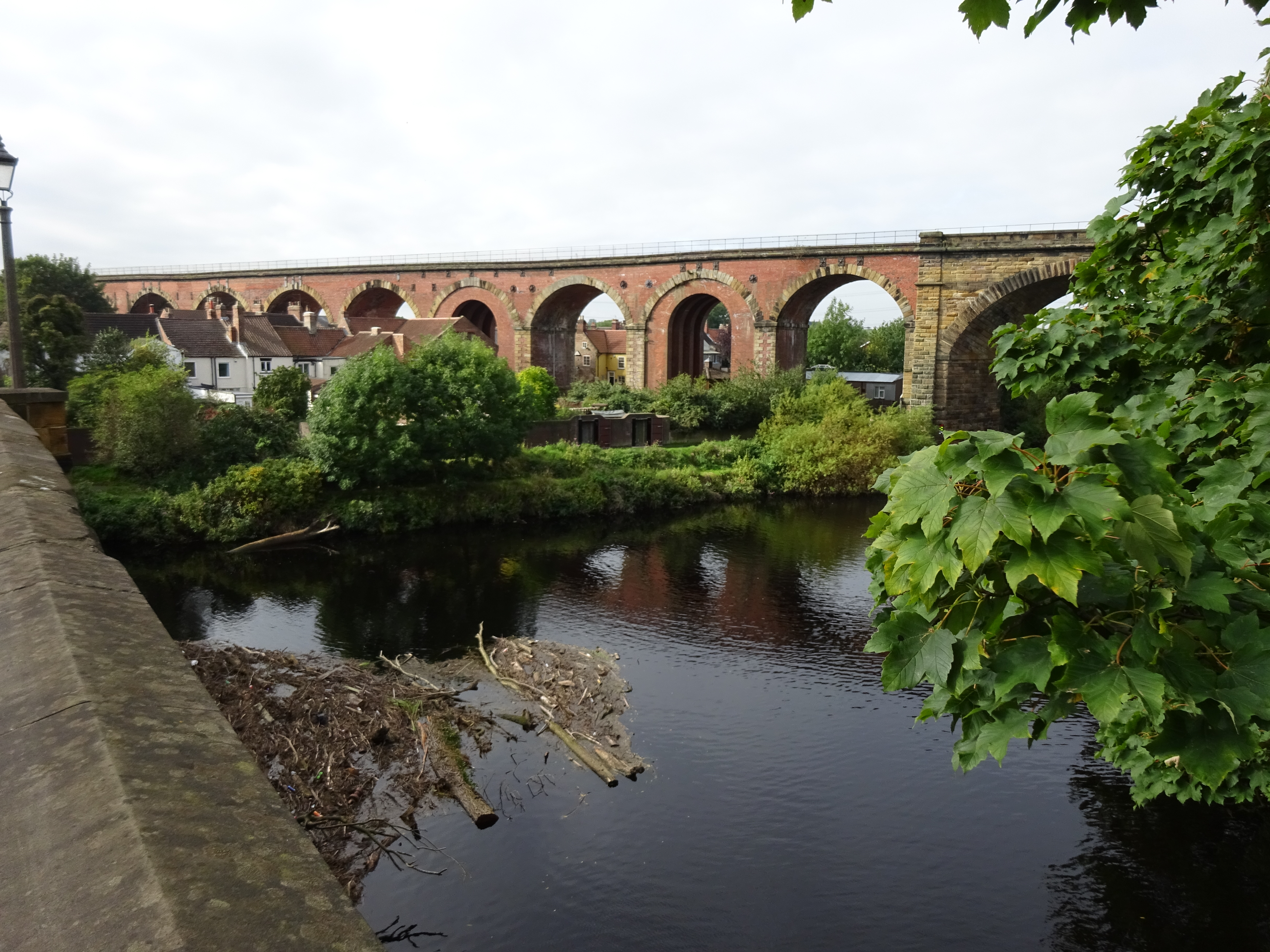
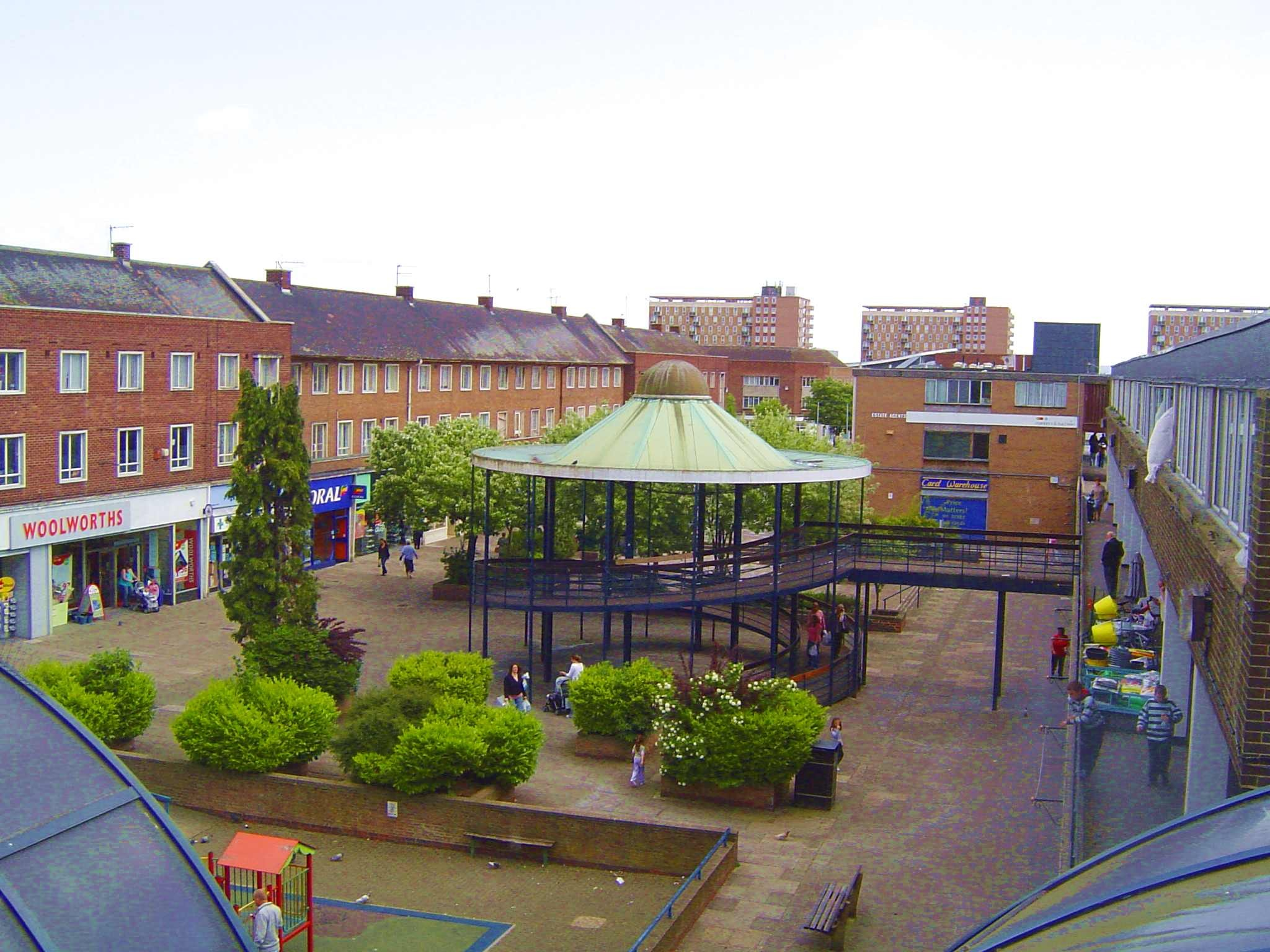
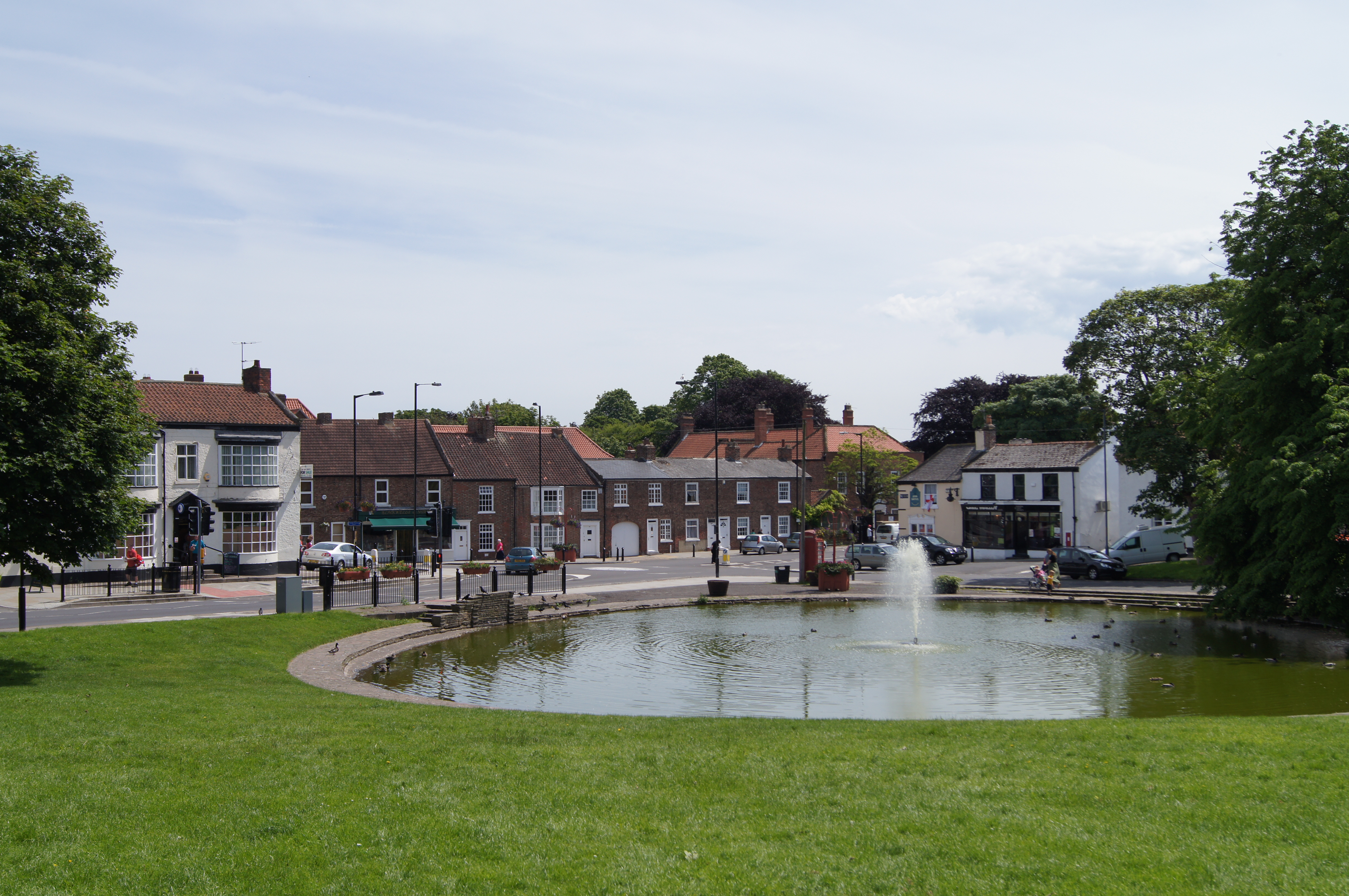
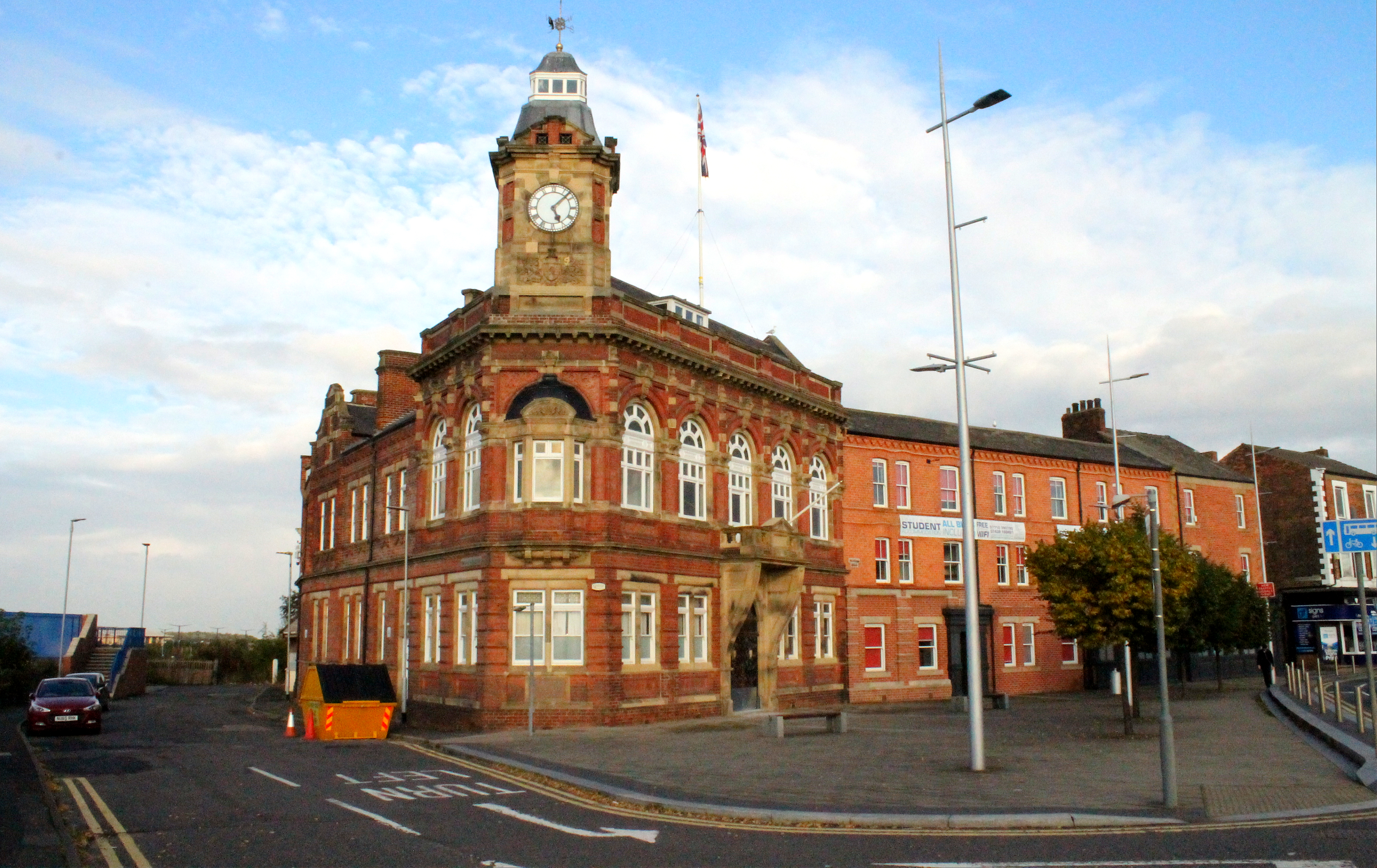
- From left to right; Top: Stockton Town Hall; Middle: Yarm Viaduct and Billingham town centre; Bottom: Norton and Thornaby Town Hall

- Coat of arms
- Motto: Forward as One
- The part of the borough in County Durham

- The part of the borough in North Yorkshire
- Coordinates: 54.56°N 1.30°W
- Sovereign state: United Kingdom
- Country: England
- Region: North East
- Ceremonial counties: County Durham; North Yorkshire
- City region: Tees Valley
- Incorporated: 1 April 1974
- Unitary authority: 1 April 1996
- Named for: Stockton-on-Tees
- Administrative HQ: Municipal buildings, Stockton-on-Tees

Government
  - Type: Unitary authority
  - Body: Stockton-on-Tees Borough Council
  - Executive: Leader and cabinet
  - Control: No overall control
  - Leader: Bob Cook (L)
  - Mayor: John Gardner
  - MPs: 3 MPs: Andy McDonald (L); Chris McDonald (L); Matt Vickers (C)

Area
  - Total: 79 sq mi (205 km^{2})
  - Rank: 143rd

Population (2025)
  - Total: 207,158
  - Rank: 98th
  - Density: 2,620/sq mi (1,011/km^{2})

Ethnicity (2021)
  - Ethnic groups: List: 92.0% White; 4.6% Asian; 1.4% Mixed; 1.1% Black; 0.8% other

Religion (2021)
  - Religion: List: 51.1% Christianity; 39.1% no religion; 3.4% Islam; 0.4% Hinduism; 0.4% Sikhism; 0.3% Buddhism; 0.0% Judaism; 0.3% other; 5.0% not stated
- Time zone: UTC+0 (GMT)
  - Summer (DST): UTC+1 (BST)
- Postcode areas: TS
- Dialling codes: 01642
- ISO 3166 code: GB-STT
- GSS code: E06000004
- Website: stockton.gov.uk

The Borough of Stockton-on-Tees is a unitary authority area with borough status in County Durham and North Yorkshire, England. In 2021, it had a population of 196,600.

The main settlement and namesake of the borough is Stockton-on-Tees, which lies on the north bank of the River Tees in County Durham, along with the towns of Billingham and Norton-on-Tees. The borough also includes the towns of Ingleby Barwick, Thornaby-on-Tees and Yarm, all south of the Tees, in North Yorkshire. Bridges spanning the River Tees include the Yarm Viaduct and the Tees Transporter Bridge. The borough is locally governed by Stockton-on-Tees Borough Council and forms part of the Tees Valley together with the boroughs of Darlington, Middlesbrough, Redcar and Cleveland and Hartlepool. Teesside International Airport is partly within the borough.

== History ==
=== Municipal authority ===
Stockton previously held borough status as the Municipal Borough of Stockton-on-Tees in historic County Durham.

=== Loss of status ===
In 1968, the borough was merged into Teesside County Borough; this civil parish was a part of the ceremonial (not administrative) North Riding county until its abolition.

=== District authority ===
The town regained borough status on 1 April 1974 as a result of the Local Government Act 1972. It became a non-metropolitan district of the County of Cleveland, itself established at the same time. Multiple parishes and boroughs merged into Stockton's newly formed district borough:

- Teesside County Borough's area covering the former Stockton, Billingham and Thornaby municipal boroughs,
- Hilton, Ingleby Barwick, Kirklevington, Maltby, and Yarm parishes of the previous North Riding County-administered Stokesley Rural District, and
- Part of the County Durham-administered Stockton Rural District parishes.

=== Unitary authority ===
The borough with its section of ceremonial county boundary (the River Tees) shown, which bisects the borough.

The borough became a unitary authority on 1 April 1996. It is ceremonially split between County Durham and North Yorkshire, to the north and south of the Tees respectively. It is the only council in England to be split between two ceremonial counties. The former districts and boroughs of Durham now form the unitary authority of County Durham, so ceremonial County Durham now has four unitary authorities.

== Economy ==
The Office for National Statistics has published a chart (pp. 240–253) of the trend of regional gross value of Hartlepool and Stockton-on-Tees (figures in sterling [millions]).

Year	Regional gross value added^{4}	Agriculture^{1}	Industry^{2}	Services^{3}
1995	2,804	9	1,443	1,352
2000	3,252	6	1,359	1,887
2003	3,364	6	1,037	2,320

^1 includes hunting and forestry.

^2 includes energy and construction.

^3 includes financial intermediation services indirectly measured.

^4 Components may not sum to totals due to rounding.

== Demographics ==
In the 2021 census, the borough was recorded as having a population of 196,595 with 50.9% being female.

For sexuality, those who identified as straight or heterosexual were 91.6%, gay or lesbian were 1.4%, bisexual were 0.9%, pansexual were 0.2%, asexual were 0.0%, queer were 0.0, 'all other sexual orientations' were 0.0% and those who did not answer were 5.9%.

[Note, for percentages with 0.0%, this may be due to a number too low to represent using the number of digits supplied rather than a lack of those who identified with that specific orientation.]

Sex
2021 Census	Count	%
All usual residents	196,595	100.0
Female	100,072	50.9
Male	96,523	49.1

== Local nature reserves ==
The council maintains a number of local nature reserves including Barwick Pond, Charlton's Pond, Greenvale, Hardwick Dene and Elm Tree Woods, Norton Grange Marsh, Quarry Wood (Eaglescliffe), and Stillington Forest Park.

== Town and parish councils ==
=== Town councils ===
- County Durham: Billingham
- North Yorkshire: Ingleby Barwick • Thornaby-on-Tees • Yarm-on-Tees

=== Parish councils ===
- County Durham: Aislaby and Newsham • Carlton • Elton • Egglescliffe and Eaglescliffe • Grindon • Long Newton • Norton-on-Tees • Preston-on-Tees • Redmarshall • Stillington and Whitton • Wolviston • Wynyard
- North Yorkshire: Hilton • Kirklevington and Castle Levington • Maltby
