= Wynyard Hall =

Hall and grounds in England

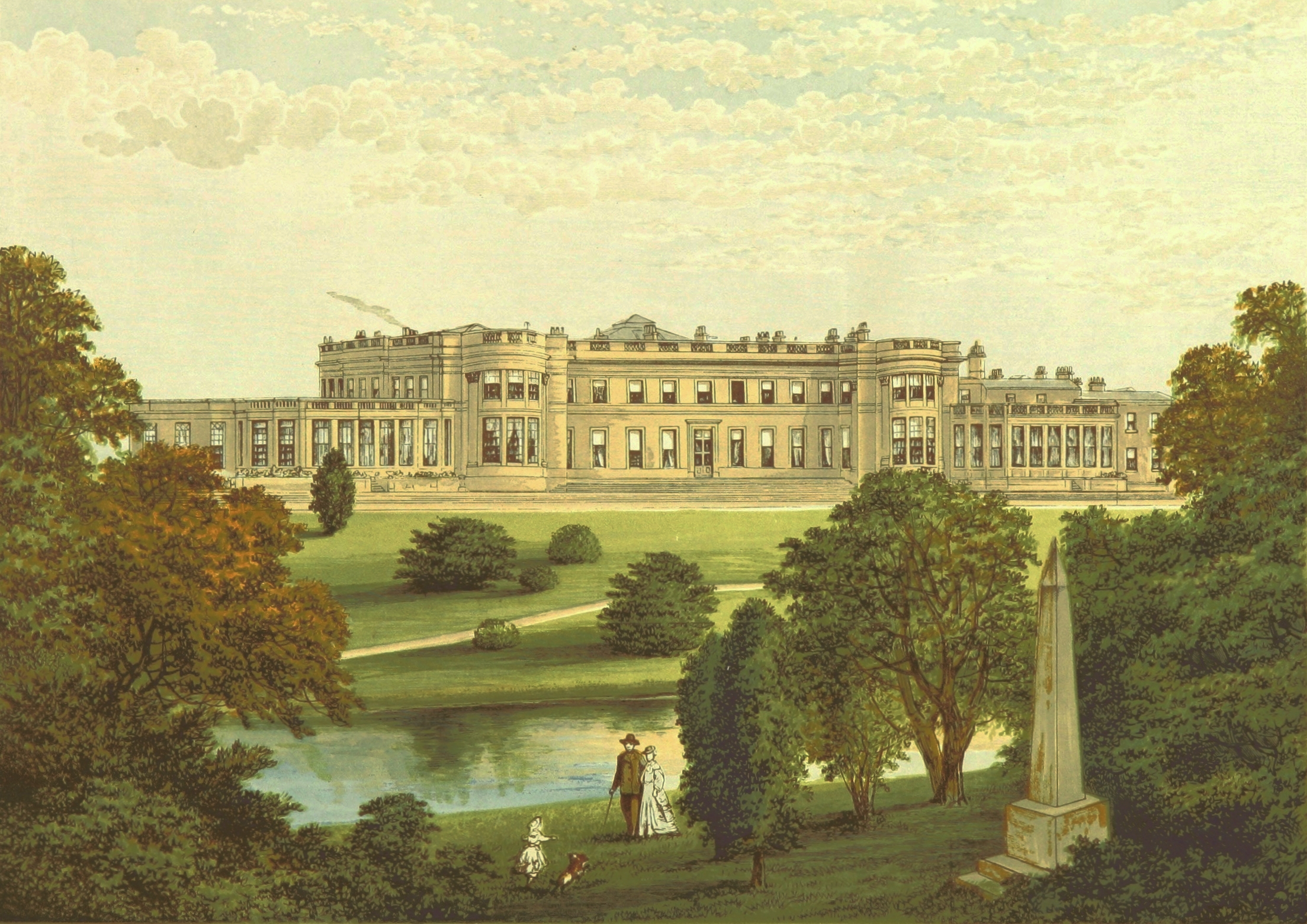
- Wynyard Hall, circa 1880

- Location in County Durham

General information
- Architectural style: Neo-Palladian
- Location: Wynyard, Stockton-on-Tees, England, UK
- Coordinates: 54.6252°N 1.3503°W
- OS grid: NZ425255
- Client: Charles Vane, 3rd Marquess of Londonderry
- Owner: Sir John Hall and family

Wynyard Hall is a large English country house near Stockton-on-Tees in County Durham. The house was the English family seat of the Vane-Tempest-Stewart family, Marquesses of Londonderry, an Anglo-Irish aristocratic dynasty, until it was sold to Sir John Hall in 1987. It is currently used as an events venue.

The garden village of Wynyard was constructed on the grounds of the hall.

== The house ==
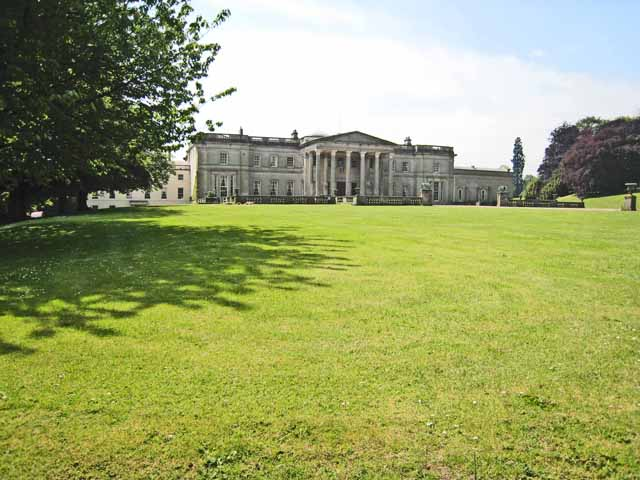
View towards the entrance front

The building was originally designed by Benjamin Dean Wyatt and completed by Philip Wyatt between 1822 and 1830. The entrance front has 13 bays and a 6-column Corinthian portico.

The entrance hall resembles that of Mount Stewart, the family's estate in Northern Ireland. It has a coffered segmental tunnel vault with apses at both ends and in the middle. There was a large crystal chandelier suspended from the ceiling. The main octagonal centre hall extends the full height of the house and has a dome with caryatids around it and a skylight. There is also a mirrored drawing room with a gilded and painted ceiling, and a vast ballroom similar to that of the family's London residence, Londonderry House.

The family wing of the mansion was nicknamed the Duke's Wing, as it was named after the Duke of Wellington and his visit in 1827. This side of the house also held the Duke's Gallery, where the family housed their famed art collection when not in London.

== Gardens ==
Many statues adorn the grand entrance court outside the house and a wide path leading to an obelisk. This, 127 feet (39 m) high, commemorates the arranged visit of the 1st Duke of Wellington, the national hero who also served as Prime Minister, to the house and the area in 1827.

At its height in the 19th century, the Wynyard Estate occupied 7,000 acres (2,800 ha) (28 km²) in Teesside. The grounds today include a 15-acre (61,000 m^{2}) ornamental lake, a walled garden, two entrance lodges, three cottages, a former racing yard, and productive farmland.

== Brief history ==
The house was started by Benjamin Dean Wyatt and finished by Philip Wyatt for Charles Vane, 3rd Marquess of Londonderry, a famous coal magnate and founder of Seaham Harbour. The marquess spent £130,000 (equivalent to £11,450,000 in 2025) to build and furnish the home. In 1841, just as the residence was being completed, a fire broke out and gutted the building; it was later restored and remodelled by Ignatius Bonomi.

There had been a house on the site since the Middle Ages, and the 3rd Marquess of Londonderry incorporated parts of an earlier 18th-century building into his home.

In the 19th century, George Vane-Tempest, who became Earl Vane in 1854 and the 5th Marquess of Londonderry in 1872, owned vast estates – 27,000 acres (11,000 ha) in Ireland, and 23,000 acres (9,300 ha) in England and Wales. He also sat in the House of Commons as a Member of Parliament for 26 years. Upon the death of the 5th Marquess in 1884, his eldest son Charles became the 6th Marquess. It was the 6th Marquess's wife, Lady Theresa, who was the model for the famous Lady Roehampton in Vita Sackville-West's The Edwardians.

The estate began to be neglected between the two world wars.

The estate remained in the Londonderry family until 1987, although it had been let as a training school for teachers from 1945 until 1960, during which time it lost most of its original contents through sales and breakages.

The estate was sold in 1987 to Sir John Hall, along with 5,000 acres (2,000 ha). Hall spent £4,000,000 to restore the house, hiring Rupert Lord to oversee the restoration; he later moved his company headquarters, as well as his home, into the mansion. The estate, comprising the house and 780 acres (320 ha) of parkland, was listed for sale in July 2002 for £8,000,000 but was never sold. It is now a special event venue owned by the Hall family and, while much of the estate has been given over to residential and light-industrial development, the parkland around the house has been preserved. The original walled garden has also been restored as a tourist attraction and hospitality venue.

== Royal visits ==
King Edward VII and Queen Alexandra (as Prince and Princess of Wales before 1901) were frequent visitors to Wynyard. As King, Edward presided over a meeting of the Privy Council there in 1903 — the first time the Council had met in a house belonging to a subject since 1625.

King George V also visited as Prince of Wales, including in November 1902.

== See also ==
- Marquess of Londonderry
- Londonderry House
- Mount Stewart
- Plas Machynlleth
- Seaham Hall
- Loring Hall
