= Briarcroft Pasture =

Biological site in Durham, England

- Location within County Durham
- Location: Stockton-on-Tees, County Durham, England
- Coordinates: 54°34′4″N 1°23′23″W
- Area: 1.8 ha (4.4 acres)
- Established: 2004
- Governing body: Natural England
- Website: Map of site

Briarcroft Pasture (grid reference NZ394193) is a 1.76 hectare biological Site of Special Scientific Interest in County Durham, England notified in 2004.

== Reason for notification ==
SSSIs are designated by Natural England, formally English Nature, which uses the 1974–1996 county system. This means there is no grouping of SSSIs by Stockton-on-Tees unitary authority, or County Durham which is the relevant ceremonial county . As such Briarcroft Pasture is one of 18 SSSIs in the Cleveland area of search.

Briarcroft Pasture is nationally important for its species-rich grassland which is unimproved by fertilisers. This type of grassland – once common in the Tees lowland – is becoming increasingly rare, with associated species also becoming rare. Briarcroft Pasture is one of only two remaining examples of this habitat in the Tees lowland area. The other example is Whitton Bridge Pasture an SSSI approximately 3 km to the north which was designated at the same time but is significantly larger.

Under the British National Vegetation Classification (NVC), Briarcroft Pasture is considered as mesotrophic grassland because it represents a well-drained and permanent pasture. In particular it is considered the MG5 community due to the species present. MG5 is widespread in many lowland areas in England, Wales and Scotland as well as the Midlands and Yorkshire. Briarcroft Pasture is predominantly subcommunity MG5c (Danthonia decumbens); however, this forms a mosaic with community MG9, which is associated with poorly drained permanent pastures.

== Site description ==
=== Abiotic ===
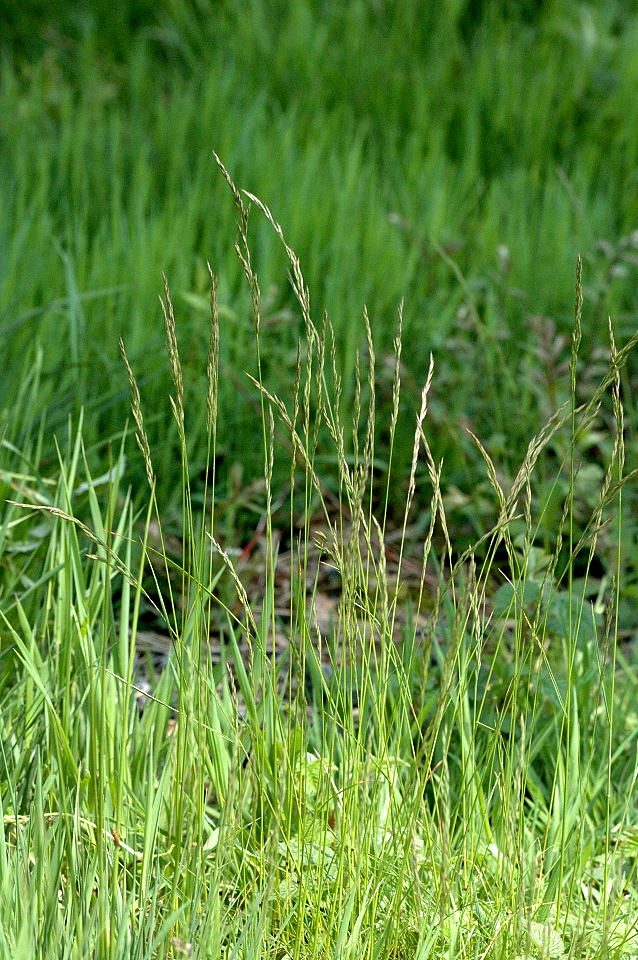
Red Fescue is one of the dominant species in subcommunity MG5c and is found at Briarcroft Pasture.

Briarcrift Pasture, located west of Stockton-on-Tees and close to Whinney Hill, County Durham, is a small site 1.8 hectares (4.4 acres). Topographically the site is level and has an altitude of approximately 50 m and is adjacent to a small stream. The underlying geology of Whitton Bridge Pasture is responsible for shaping the species-rich community found on the surface. Glacial tills and sands are the prominent geological features resulting in a relatively base-poor soil, characteristic of glacial drift geology. The soils of MG5c (Danthonia decumbens) subcommunity are typically acidic.

Located in North East England, Briarcroft Pasture experience a climate that differs from the UK average.^{[A]} The North East receives on average 370 mm less rainfall than the UK over a year. Similarly the North East has roughly 129 days each year with more than 1 mm of rainfall, this is over 25 days less than UK average. Temperature is similar for both the North East and the UK, although the North East does have fewer days with air frost and more hours of sunshine per year.

=== Biotic ===
The majority of the site is made up of species-rich grassland (subcommunity MG5c), which comprises three dominant species of grass and several other grass species at lower abundances. The dominant species are Red Fescue (Festuca rubra), Common Bent (Agrostis capillaris) and Yorkshire Fog (Holcus lanatus). The less abundant species of grass include, Crested Dog’s-tail (Cynosurus cristatus), Heath-grass (Danthonia decumbens) and Cocksfoot (Dactylis glomerata). The subcommunity also has many broad-leaved herbs including Common Knapweed (Centaurea nigra), Tormentil (Potentilla erecta), Devils-bit scabious (Succisa pratensis) and Betony (Stachys officinalis).

A second community, MG9, forms a mosaic with the species rich grassland of MG5. This second community is associated with Holcus lanatus and Deschampsia caespitosa. Other prominent plants are herbs, including many species with a local distribution among them; Saw-wort (Serratula tinctoria) and dyer’s greenweed (Genista tinctoria). Meadow Barley (Hordeum secalinum) is also present.

== Notes ==
It is therefore likely that the differences described in the article are an underestimate of how Whitton Bridge Pasture differs to the national climate.
