= Phytosociology =

Empirical study of plant growth in communities

Phytosociology, also known as phytocoenology or simply plant sociology, is the study of groups of species of plant that are usually found together. Phytosociology aims to empirically describe the vegetative environment of a given territory. A specific community of plants is considered a social unit, the product of definite conditions, present and past, and can exist only when such conditions are met. In phyto-sociology, such a unit is known as a phytocoenosis (or phytocoenose). A phytocoenosis is more commonly known as a plant community, and consists of the sum of all plants in a given area. It is a subset of a biocoenosis, which consists of all organisms in a given area. More strictly speaking, a phytocoenosis is a set of plants in area that are interacting with each other through competition or other ecological processes. Coenoses are not equivalent to ecosystems, which consist of organisms and the physical environment that they interact with. A phytocoensis has a distribution which can be mapped. Phytosociology has a system for describing and classifying these phytocoenoses in a hierarchy, known as syntaxonomy, and this system has a nomenclature. The science is most advanced in Europe, Africa and Asia.

In the United States this concept was largely rejected in favour of studying environments in more individualistic terms regarding species, where specific associations of plants occur randomly because of individual preferences and responses to gradients, and there are no sharp boundaries between phytocoenoses. The terminology 'plant community' is usually used in the US for a habitat consisting of a number of specific plant species.

It has been a successful approach in the scope of contemporary vegetation science because of its highly descriptive and predictive powers, and its usefulness in nature management issues.

== History ==
The term 'phytosociology' was coined in 1896 by Józef Paczoski. The term 'phytocoenology' was coined by Helmut Gams in 1918. While the terminology phytocoenosis grew to be most popular in France, Switzerland, Germany and the Soviet Union, the terminology phytosociology remained in use in some European countries.

Phytosociology is a further refinement of the phytogeography introduced by Alexander von Humboldt at the very beginning of the 19th century.

Phytocoenology was initially considered to be a subdiscipline of 'geobotany'.

In Scandinavia the concept of plant associations was popular at an early date. Hampus von Post (1842, 1862), Ragnar Hult (1881, 1898), Thore Christian Elias Fries (1913), Gustaf Einar Du Rietz (1921).

- Rübel (1922, 1930), Pavillard (1927),
- Schröter & Kirchner (1886–1902), Flahault & Carl Joseph Schröter (1910),

In the Soviet Union an important botanist to apply and popularise the science was Vladimir Sukachev. Probably the first Russian writer on the subject was Sergey Korzhinsky (1861-1900).

The science of phytosociology has hardly penetrated into the English-speaking world, where the continuum concept of community prevailed, opposed to the concept of a 'society' of plants. Nonetheless it had some early adherents in the United States, notably Frederic Clements in particular, who used the concept to characterise the vegetation of California. Largely following European ideas, he devised his own system to classify habitat types using vegetation. Clements most important contribution was his study of succession. His work has seen much local usage. In Britain Arthur Tansley was the first to apply phytosociological concepts to the vegetation of the kingdom in 1911 after learning of its application elsewhere in Europe. Tansley eventually broadened the concept and thus came up with the idea of an ecosystem, combining all biotic and abiotic ecological aspects of an environment. The work of Tansley and Clements was quite divergent from the rest.

=== Usage today ===
Modern phytosociology largely follows the work of Józef Paczoski in Poland, Josias Braun-Blanquet in France and Gustaf Einar Du Rietz in Sweden.

In Europe a complete classification system has been developed to describe the vegetation types found across the continent. These are used as habitat-type classifications in the NATURA 2000 network and in Habitats Directive legislation. Each phytocoenose has been given a number, and protected areas can thus be classified according to the habitats they contain. In Europe this information is generally mapped per 2 km² blocks for conservation purposes, such as monitoring particularly endangered habitat types, predicting success of reintroductions, or estimating more specific carrying capacities. Because certain habitats are deemed more imperilled (i.e. having a higher conservation value) than others, a numerical conservation value of a specific site can be approximated.

== Overview ==
The aim of phytosociology is to achieve a sufficient empirical model of vegetation using combinations of plant species (or subspecies, i.e. taxa) that characterize discrete vegetation units. Vegetation units as understood by phytosociologists may express largely abstract vegetation concepts (e.g. the set of all hard-leaved evergreen forests of western Mediterranean area) or actual readily recognizable vegetation types (e.g. cork-oak oceanic forests on Pleistocene dunes with dense canopy in Iberian Peninsula). Such conceptual units are called syntaxa (singular "syntaxon") and can be set in a hierarchy system called "synsystem" or syntaxonomic system. Creating new syntaxa or adjusting the synsystem is called syntaxonomy. Before the rules were agreed upon, a number of slightly different systems of classification existed. These were known as "schools" or "traditions", and there were two main systems: the older Scandinavian school and the Zürich-Montpellier school, also sometimes called the Braun-Blanquet approach.

=== Relevé ===
The first step in phytosociology is gathering data. This is done with what is known as a relevé, a plot in which all the species are identified, and their abundance both vertically and in area are calculated. Other data are also recorded for a relevé: the geographic location, environmental factors and vegetation structure. Boolean operators and (formerly) tables are used to sort the data. As the calculations needed are difficult and tedious to do manually, modern ecologists feed the relevé data into software programs that use algorithms to crunch the numbers.

=== Association model ===
The basic unit of syntaxonomy, the organisation and nomenclature of phytosociological relationships, is the "association", defined by its characteristic combination of plant taxa. Sometimes other habitat features such as the management by humans (mowing regime, for example), physiognomy and/or the stage in ecological succession may also be considered. Such an association is usually viewed as a discrete phytocoenose. Similar and neighbouring associations can be grouped in larger ecological conceptual units, with a group of plant associations called an "alliance". Similar alliances may be grouped in "orders" and orders in vegetation "classes". The setting of syntaxa in such a hierarchy makes up the syntaxonomical system.

The most important workers to define the modern system were initially Charles Flahault, with the work of his student Josias Braun-Blanquet being the what is generally considered the final version of syntaxonomical nomenclature. Braun-Blanquet further refined and standardised the work of Flahault and many others when he worked on the phytocoenosis of the southern Cévennes. He established the modern system of classifying vegetation. Braun-Blanquet's method uses the scientific name of its most characteristic species as namesake, changing the ending of the generic epithet to "-etum" and treating the specific epithet as an adjective. Thus, a particular type of mesotrophic grassland widespread in western Europe and dominated only by the grass Arrhenatherum elatius becomes "Arrhenatheretum elatioris Br.-Bl.". To distinguish between similar plant communities dominated by the same species, other important species are included in the name, but the name is otherwise is formed according to the same rules. Another type of mesotrophic pasture dominated by black knapweed (Centaurea nigra) and the grass Cynosurus cristatus, which is also widespread in western Europe, is consequently named Centaureo-Cynosuretum cristati Br.-Bl. & Tx.. If the second species is characteristic but notably less dominant than the first one, its genus name may be used as the adjective, for example in Pterocarpetum rhizophorosus, a type of tropical scrubland near water which has abundant Pterocarpus officinalis and significant (though not overwhelmingly prominent) red mangrove (Rhizophora mangle).

Today an International Code of Phytosociological Nomenclature exists, in which the rules for naming syntaxa are given. Its use has increased among botanists.

In Anglo-American ecology, the association concept is mostly linked to the work of the mid-twentieth century botanist Henry Gleason, who set it up as an alternative to Frederic Clement's views on the superorganismic framework. The philosophical parameters of the association concept have also come under study by environmental philosophers as to how it values and defends the natural environment.

=== Vegetation complexes ===
Modern phytosociologists try to include higher levels of complexity in the perception of vegetation, namely by describing whole successional units (vegetation series) or, in general, vegetation complexes. Other developments include the use of multivariate statistics for the definition of syntaxa and their interpretation.

== Data collections ==
Phytosociological data contain information collected in relevés (or plots) listing each species cover-abundance values and the measured environmental variables. This data is conveniently databanked in a program like TURBOVEG allowing for editing, storage and export to other applications.

Data is usually classified and sorted using TWINSPAN in host programs like JUICE to create realistic species-relevé associations. Further patterns are investigated using clustering and resemblance methods, and ordination techniques available in software packages like CANOCO or the R-package vegan.

== See also ==
- António Rodrigo Pinto da Silva
- Lichen community
- Victor Westhoff
