= Josias Braun-Blanquet =

Swiss phytosociologist and botanist (1884–1980)

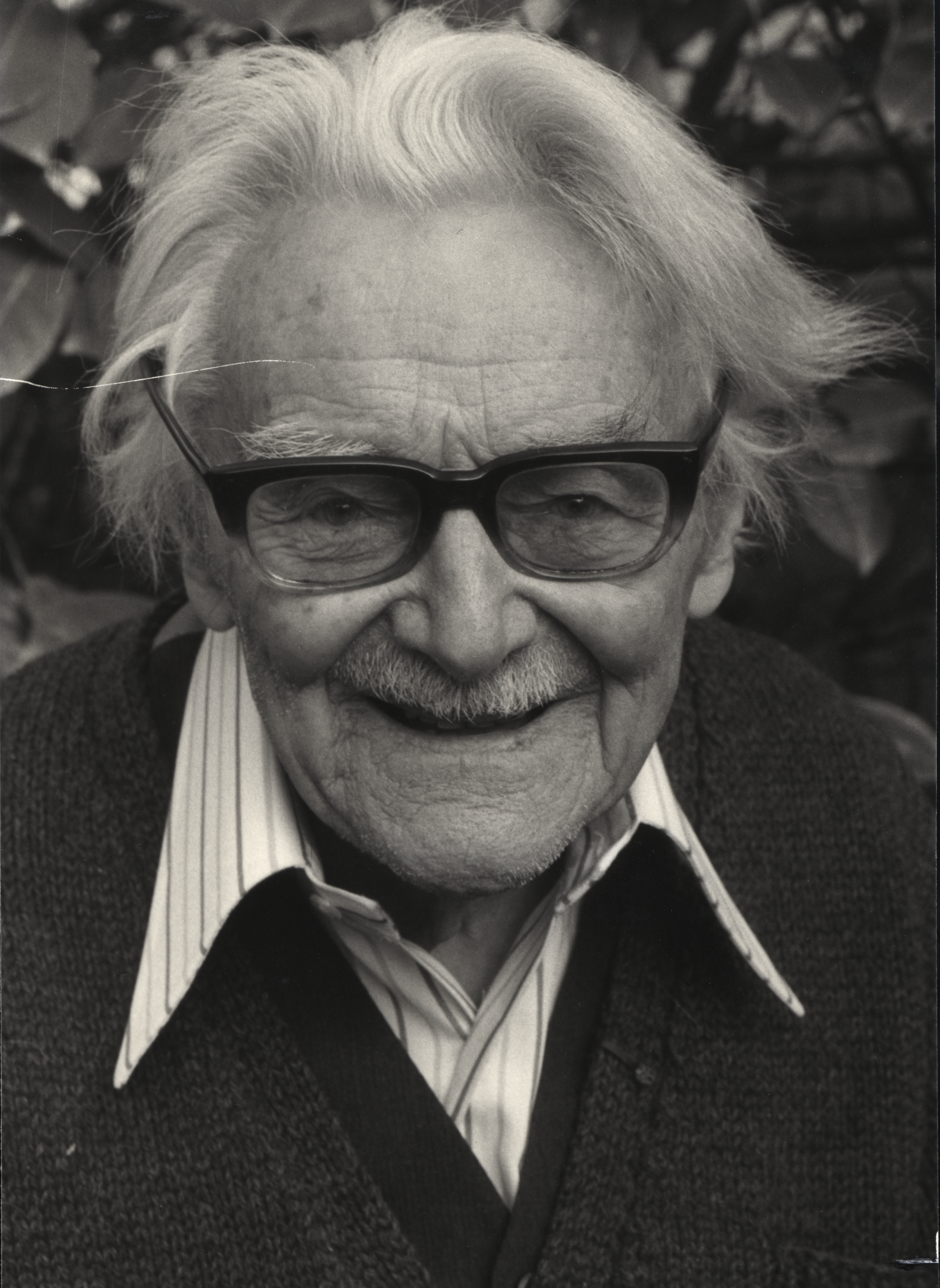
Josias Braun-Blanquet

Josias Braun-Blanquet (3 August 1884 – 20 September 1980) was an influential phytosociologist and botanist. Braun-Blanquet was born in Chur, Switzerland, and died in Montpellier, France.

== Biography ==
In Josias Braun-Blanquet's dissertation, supervised by Charles Flahault, he worked on the phytosociology of the southern Cévennes. Between 1918 and 1938 he edited the exsiccata Flora Rhaetica exsiccata distributing plant specimens with detailed information on their habitat and ecological demands. Subsequently he established the modern way of classifying vegetation according to floristic composition. This is what makes him one of the most influential botanists until today.

Braun-Blanquet's way of classifying a plant community uses the scientific name of its most characteristic species as namesake, changing the ending of the generic name to "-etum" and treating the specific epithet as adjective. Thus, a particular type of mesotrophic grassland widespread in western Europe and dominated only by false oat-grass (Arrhenatherum elatius) becomes Arrhenatheretum elatioris Br.-Bl..

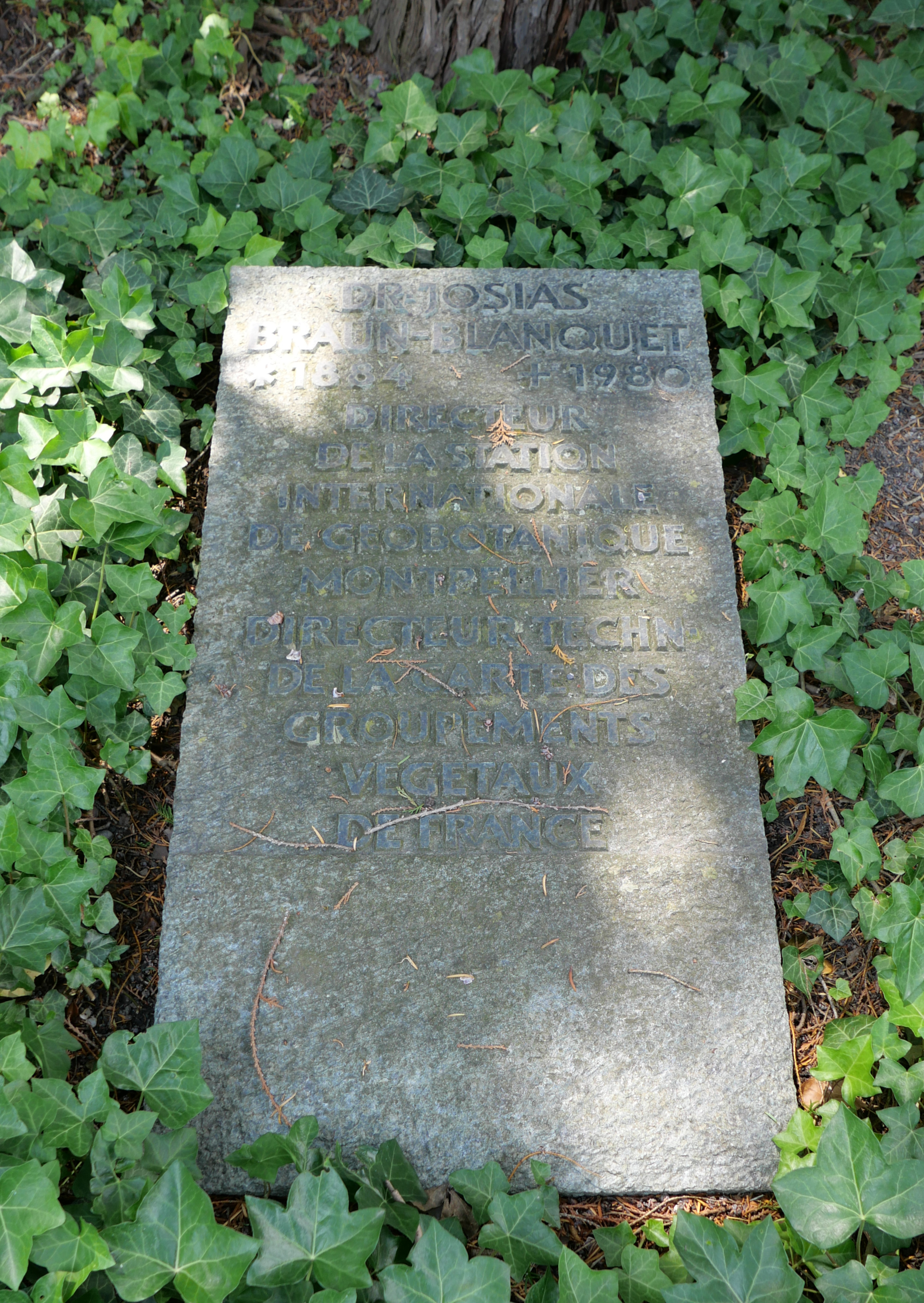
The grave of Braun-Blanquet at the Daleu cemetery in Chur.

To distinguish between similar plant communities dominated by the same species, other important species are included in the name which otherwise is formed according to the same rules. Another type of mesotrophic pastureland – also widespread in western Europe but dominated by black knapweed (Centaurea nigra) and crested dog's-tail (Cynosurus cristatus) – is consequently named Centaureo-Cynosuretum cristati Br.-Bl. & Tx..

If the second species is characteristic but notably less dominant than the first one, its genus name may be used as the adjective, for example in Pterocarpetum rhizophorosus, a type of tropical scrubland near water which has abundant Pterocarpus officinalis and significant (though not overwhelmingly prominent) red mangrove (Rhizophora mangle).

== Awards and commemoration ==
- 1974: Linnean Medal
- Alchemilla braun-blanquetii, a species of lady's mantle known from a single site in Polish Tatra Mountains, was named in his honour.

== Publications ==
- Braun-Blanquet, Josias (1964): Pflanzensoziologie, Grundzüge der Vegetationskunde. (3. Auflage). Springer Verlag, Wien, 865 pages.
- La Végétation alpine des Pyrénées Orientales, étude de phyto-sociologie comparée (Monografías de la Estación de Estudios Pirenaicos y del Instituto Español de Edafología, Ecología y Fisiología Vegetal, 9 (Bot. 1). Consejo Superior de Investigaciones Científicas, Barcelona, 1948).
- Las comunidades vegetales de la depresión del Ebro y su dinamismo, con Oriol de Bolòs (Ayuntamiento de Zaragoza, 1987).
