= Whitton Bridge Pasture =

Grassland in Stockton-on-Tees, England

- Location within County Durham
- Location: Stockton-on-Tees, County Durham, England
- Coordinates: 54°35′38″N 01°24′12″W
- Area: 3.18 ha (7.9 acres)
- Established: 2004
- Governing body: Natural England
- Website: Map of site

Whitton Bridge Pasture is a Site of Special Scientific Interest (SSSI) in the unitary authority of Stockton-on-Tees, England. At 3.18 hectares (7.9 acres) it lies to the south of Whitton village and north west of Stockton-on-Tees. SSSIs are chosen by Natural England, and Whitton Bridge Pasture was designated in 2004 because of its biological interest. It is one of 18 SSSIs in the Cleveland area of search.

The biological interest is focused on the species-rich mesotrophic grassland found across the site, which is actively maintained by grazing. The species present are predominantly grasses, although herbs and orchids are also found. The area has been classified as MG5 under the British National Vegetation Classification because of the species composition. The site is small and isolated, and therefore requires careful management to avoid damage caused by activity on neighbouring land.

== Reason for notification ==
SSSIs are designated by Natural England, previously English Nature, which uses the 1974–1996 county system. This means there is no grouping of SSSIs by Stockton-on-Tees unitary authority, or County Durham which is the relevant ceremonial county. As such Whitton Bridge Pasture is one of 18 SSSIs in the Cleveland area of search.

Whitton Bridge Pasture is nationally important for its species-rich grassland which is unimproved by fertilisers. This type of grassland—once common in the Tees lowland—is becoming increasingly rare with its associated species also becoming scarce. Whitton Bridge Pasture is one of only two remaining examples of this habitat in the Tees lowland area. The other example is Briarcroft Pasture, an SSSI about 3 kilometres (1.9 mi) to the south, which was designated at the same time but is significantly smaller.

Under the British National Vegetation Classification (NVC) Whitton Bridge Pasture is considered as mesotrophic grassland because it represents well-drained and permanent pasture. In particular it is considered to be an MG5 community because of the species present. MG5 is widespread in many lowland areas in England, Wales, and Scotland, particularly in the Midlands. Whitton Bridge Pasture is predominantly subcommunity MG5c (Danthonia decumbens), however subcommunity MG5a (Lathyrus pratensis) is present with a substantially different species composition.

== Site description ==
=== Abiotic ===
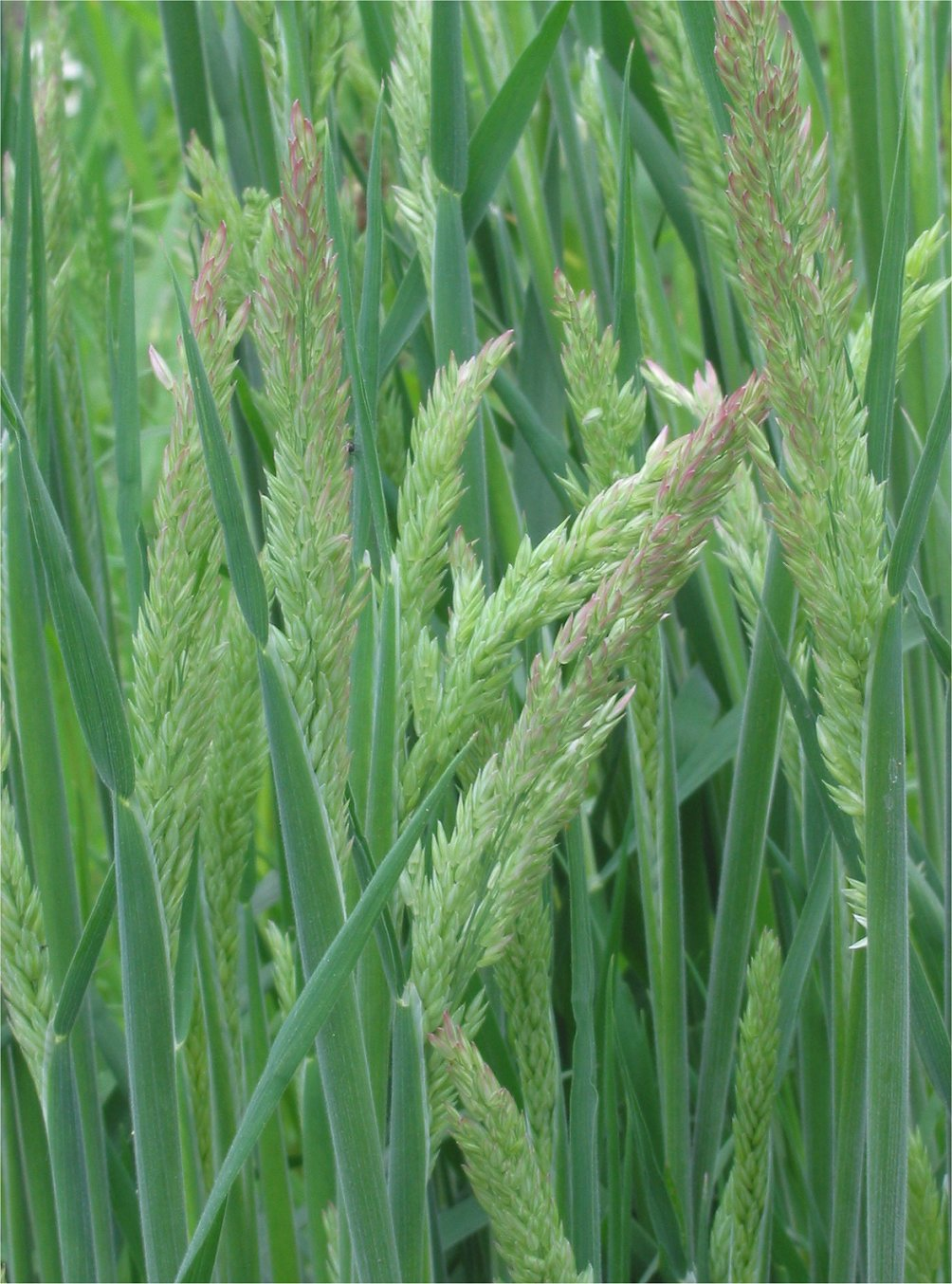
Yorkshire Fog is one of the dominant species in subcommunity MG5c.

Located north-west of Stockton-on-Tees and 500 metres (550 yd) south of the village of Whitton, it is a small site of 3.18 hectares (7.9 acres) between a sewage works and Whitton Beck. Topographically the site slopes north towards the stream from a height of 40 metres (130 ft) to less than 30 metres (98 ft). The underlying geology of Whitton Bridge Pasture is responsible for shaping the species-rich community found on the surface. Glacial tills and sands are the prominent geological features resulting in a relatively base-poor soil, characteristic of glacial drift geology. The soils of MG5c (Danthonia decumbens) subcommunity are typically acidic.

Because Whitton Bridge Pasture is located in North East England it experiences a climate that is different from the UK average. The North East receives on average 370 millimetres (15 in) less rainfall than the UK over a year. Similarly the North East has roughly 129 days each year with more than 1 millimetre (0.039 in) of rainfall, more than 25 days fewer than UK average. Despite these differences the temperature is similar for both the North East and the UK, although the North East does have fewer days with air frost and more hours of sunshine per year.

=== Biotic ===
The majority of the site is made up of species-rich grassland (subcommunity MG5c), which comprises three dominant species of grass and several other grass species at lower abundances. The dominant species are Red Fescue (Festuca rubra), Common Bent (Agrostis capillaris) and Yorkshire Fog (Holcus lanatus). The less abundant species of grass include, Crested Dog's-tail (Cynosurus cristatus), Heath-grass (Danthonia decumbens) and Cocksfoot (Dactylis glomerata). The subcommunity also has many broad-leaved herbs including Common Knapweed (Centaurea nigra), Tormentil (Potentilla erecta), Devils-bit scabious (Succisa pratensis) and Betony (Stachys officinalis).

A second subcommunity (MG5a) is present and is characterised by the legume Meadow vetchling (Lathyrus pratensis). Other species present in this subcommunity include Salad burnet (Sanguisorba minor), Quaking grass (Briza media), Pignut (Conopodium majus) and the Orchid species: Common Twayblade (Neottia ovata) and Early Purple Orchid (Orchis mascula). The subcommunity also contains Meadow barley (Hordeum secalinum), a perennial grass, which is a characteristic species of the Tees Lowland.

The two subcommunities of MG5, characterised by species rich grassland form a belt across the site, but they do not cover the whole site. Towards the north there is a community dominated by False oat-grass (Arrhenatherum elatius), a constant species in the MG1 and MG2 communities of the British NVC and therefore not typical of an MG5 community. At Whitton Bridge Pasture it is growing on alluvial soils located at the northern edge of the site, which have most likely been formed by Whitton Beck just to the north. A number of springs at the site are associated with flushes of the Pale sedge (Carex pallescens), which form small populations.

== Management ==
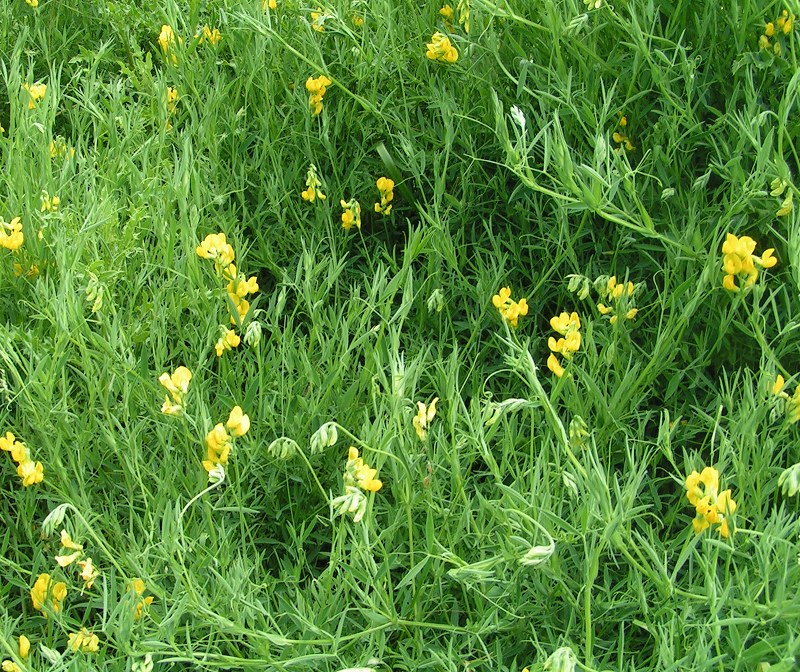
Meadow vetchling is a characteristic species of subcommunity MG5c at Whitton Bridge Pasture.

Natural England's role is to advise and help the owners manage Whitton Bridge Pasture effectively. To achieve this Natural England provides guidelines for each SSSI. Species-rich grassland, such as that found at Whitton Bridge, requires careful management for it to retain its high species diversity. This means many activities are not allowed at the site including: ploughing, drainage and the use of fertilisers, pesticides or herbicides.

Management of the site requires moderate grazing during the summer and autumn to help maintain the species diversity. This is because grazing removes each year's new growth which helps stop the site becoming dominated by vigorously growing grasses. Such grasses would allow a buildup of dead organic matter, which together with the increased growth, would reduce the growth of less vigorous species. The overall effect would be a reduction in species diversity, which was one of the reasons for the SSSI designation. Trampling can be of benefit because it breaks up accumulated dead organic matter.

The small and isolated nature of the site makes it susceptible to damage from the surrounding area. For example, herbicides, thought to be generally damaging for the species richness, could get onto the site from the drift of spray from surrounding fields. To help combat this the maintenance of mature hedgerows around the perimeter is encouraged. As of 2006 the condition of Whitton Bridge Pasture is described as favourable, which means that the land is being adequately conserved and any conservation objectives are being met, but that there is scope for enhancement of the site. The condition of the site was also described as favourable in 2004 and 2005 assessments. In the future it is hoped that the grazing regime will become more regularised and will be of high priority.
