= Stillington =

Stillington could be

- Stillington, County Durham, England
- Stillington, North Yorkshire, England
- Robert Stillington, Bishop of Bath and Wells and Lord Chancellor of England.
