= Basildon Meadows =

Site of Special Scientific Interest in Essex, England

Coordinates: 51.553°N 0.459°E

- Site of Special Scientific Interest
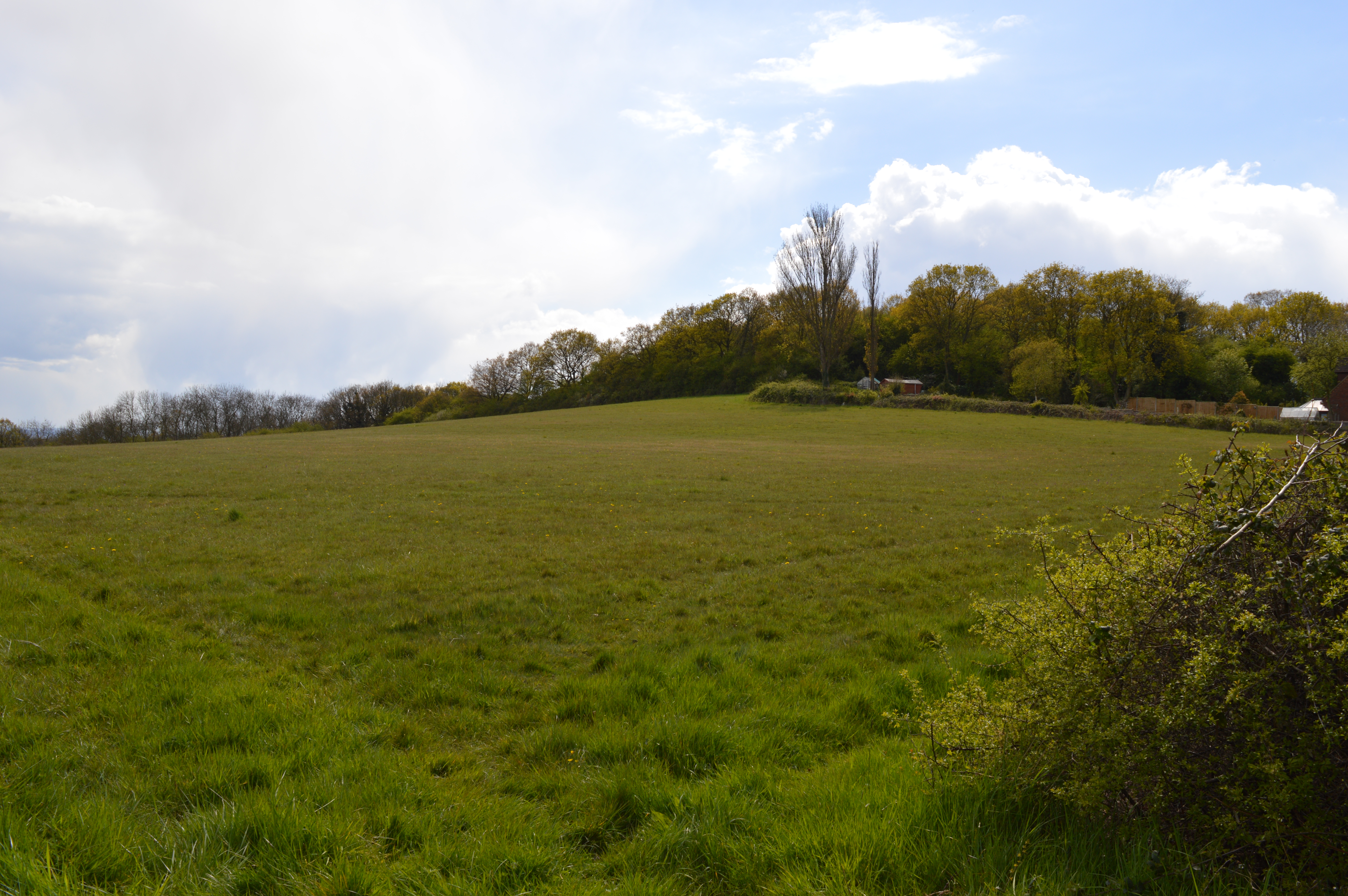
- Location of Basildon Meadows.
- Area of search: Essex
- Grid reference: TQ706867; TQ697864
- Interest: Biological
- Area: 6.5 ha (16 acres)
- Notification date: 1985
- Location map: Magic Map

Basildon Meadows is a 6.5-hectare (16-acre) biological Site of Special Scientific Interest on the southern outskirts of Basildon in Essex.

The site is composed of three unimproved meadows which have a wide variety of herbs. The principal grasses are creeping bent, rye-grass and crested dog's tail. Flowers include the green-winged orchid and yellow rattle, which are rare in Essex. There is also a small pond and scattered scrub.

The fields are private land with no public access.

== Land ownership ==
All land within Basildon Meadows SSSI is owned by the local authority
