= Carlton, County Durham =

Village and civil parish in England

Coordinates: 54.591°N 1.388°W

Carlton
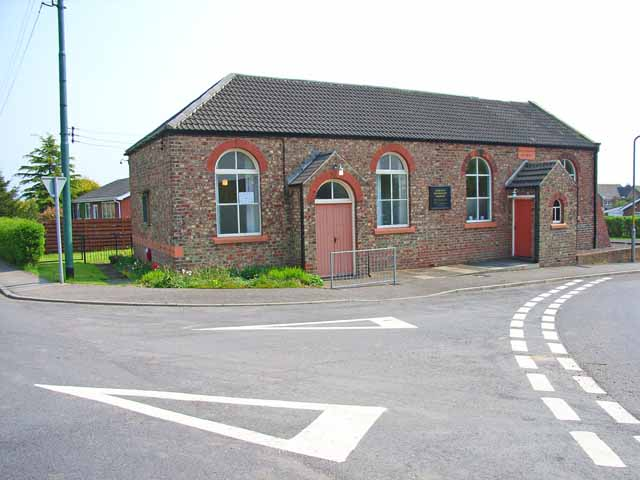
- Carlton Methodist Church

- Location within County Durham
- Population: 905 (2021)
- OS grid reference: NZ396218
- Unitary authority: Stockton-on-Tees
- Ceremonial county: County Durham
- Region: North East
- Country: England
- Sovereign state: United Kingdom
- Post town: STOCKTON-ON-TEES
- Postcode district: TS21
- Police: Cleveland
- Fire: Cleveland
- Ambulance: North East
- UK Parliament: Stockton West

Carlton is a village and civil parish within the borough of Stockton-on-Tees and ceremonial county of County Durham, England. The population of the civil parish taken at the 2021 census was 905, up from 726 in 2011. It is situated a few miles (several km) to the north-west of Stockton-on-Tees, a short distance from the village of Redmarshall.

== History ==
Although subject to much new building in the past decade, the village still retains its medieval layout, with houses facing each other across the main street, and with strips of land in front and behind. This layout had been identified as Norman, probably dating to the rebuilding of the village after William's harrying of the North.

The origin of the village of Carlton lies in the remote past, the pattern of the village was probably determined in the 11th or 12th century when estate re-organisation was commenced.

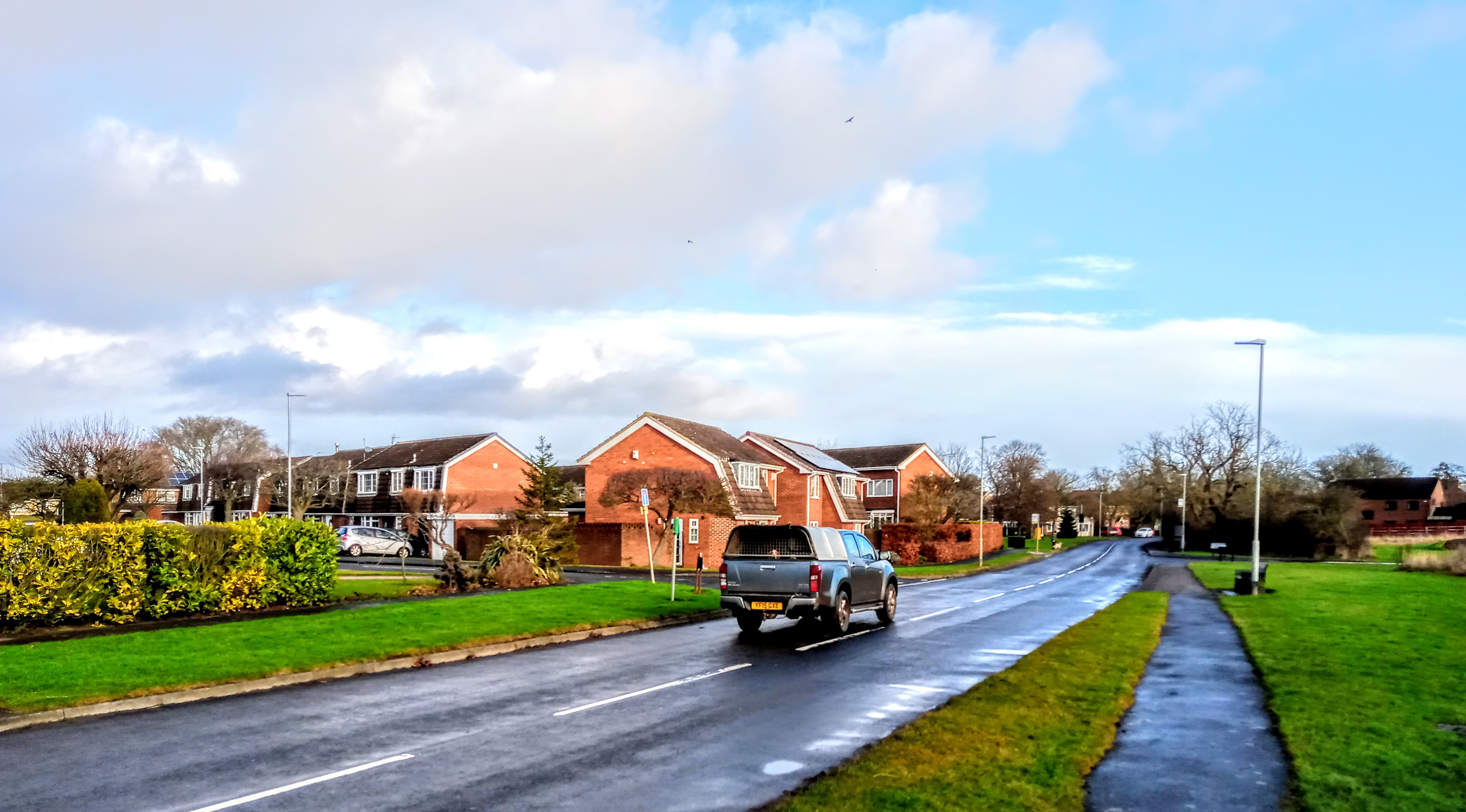
Kirk Hill, Carlton, County Durham.

It is part of the ecclesiastical parish of Redmarshall which came under the auspices of the Bishop of Durham, and is situated north of the River Tees, about 5 miles to the west of Stockton-on-Tees, and until boundary re-organisation in 1974 was part of the County of Durham. It is 160 ft. above sea level, and was essentially a small agricultural village, the farmhouses and cottages built on either side of the main village street, probably an old drovers road, with a slow flowing stream running alongside the south of the settlement.

In 1200 AD, Bishop Pudsey of Durham caused a survey (the earliest record) to be made of all his possessions, this included Carlton, in which there were 23 farmers, a miller, and that William, son of Orm of Carlton, had to come to the great chase of the Lord Bishop with one greyhound whenever required. Towards the end of the 14th century there were 124 residents and at that time tenants had a common bakehouse, the lease being two shillings paid to the Bishop.

Life in Carlton until the beginning of the 20th century was very different and much harder than that enjoyed by residents today. The only water supply was from the village pump, situated in the centre of the village, piped water was installed in about 1895, although the village pump was still in general use many years later.

Transport and travel was by foot or horsepower until the introduction of the railway to the east of the village, when a railway station (originally named Carlton Station) was constructed in about 1850. Once the Carlton Station was operating it became the local centre of industry, with goods trains, chemical works, coal depot and passenger trains. Houses and cottages were built for the workers, many of whom were housed in the village, this increased the population considerably at this time. Farmers used the railway regularly to send their milk to the dairies in the town, cows were milked, milk cooled and measured into churns and transported by horsepower to catch a train due before 7:00 a.m. so that it could be delivered at its destination fresh for breakfast.

A bus service was introduced in the 1920s; initially the bus ran only twice a week, market day and Saturday. This has now developed into an hourly service every weekday.

During the 19th century, travelling men with stallions used to visit the village to 'service' the mares owned by local farmers. As the horse was the predominant method of transport of the day, the travelling men would stay overnight at a farm in the village before going on to the next stop. The horse and cart mode of travel gradually gave way to the motor vehicle during the 20th century, and today the village is troubled with increasing traffic, some exceeding the 30 m.p.h. speed limit which was introduced in 1978.

Up until the advent of the 'combine', a steam thrashing machine travelled the area, spending a day at each farm thrashing the corn. Thrashing day was a big event on the farms; about 20 local men and women worked on the thrasher starting about 6.00 a.m. until dark. The farmer's wife had a busy day starting with breakfast (traditional), ten o'clocks, dinner (roast beef) and three o'clocks, plenty of good food for such hard work.

Before the war there were many natural landmarks, which have now disappeared. There were well used footpaths around the village, about five duck ponds, orchards, trees and hedgerows. Progress meant that roads had to be widened and old property demolished, but village greens are still very pleasantly established, lately enhanced by bulbs planted by residents and regularly maintained by the Stockton Borough Council.

Services are held each Sunday in the Methodist Chapel, built in 1871, which stands in a prominent position at the east end of the village at the junction of the roads leading to Stockton and Thorpe Thewles.

A public house 'The Smiths Arms' stands well in the centre of the village built in about 1900 (by Irish labourers lodged in the village) to replace an ancient inn nearby. Previously the South Durham Hunt used to partake of the 'Stirrup Cup' and meet here twice in the season. The Blacksmiths Shop, now the restaurant, situated next to the bar was a centre of activity in the village, gossip was exchanged, and horses shoed.

Although the village was originally a farming community with associated small industries, 'before the war' there were five working traditional farms and now only one such farm is left.

Children from the village attended the local church school at Redmarshall until it was closed in 1966, when a new primary school was built at Bishopton.

In 1928, a group of women, headed by the stationmaster's wife, held a meeting to form a Women's Institute. Many functions were held to raise money to build the hall which was completed in 1936, and which has been a great asset to both the Women's Institute and the local community. During the war soldiers were billeted in the hall Red Cross lectures were given to volunteer First Aid workers, and over the years it has been in great demand by the cricket club (now defunct) & youth clubs etc.

The first post office to be established was in 1933, when a room in a local cottage was converted for this use. The post office is now located in Carlton Village Stores. The arrival of the public telephone was much later.

There is local knowledge of a small shop at Middle Farm at the beginning of the century, & later at what is now called Glenesk Cottage. Travelling salesmen were the order of the day, until the advent of the motor car. Fruit and fishmen and butchers came weekly by horse and cart.

In 1939, a committee was formed to help the National War effort, work was put in by local inhabitants to raise funds.

A strong community spirit prevailed during the war and the local contingents of Home Guard, Special Constables, Fire Brigade and Red Cross were well supported.

There is no record of any serious crime in the parish, probably that is why there was never any resident village 'Bobby' (policeman).

Christmas Eve 1935 was a momentous day for Carlton. The electricity was switched on and things were never the same again, candles and oil lamps were thrown away. Street lighting was installed in 1963.

The playing field was established in 1975, and donated to the parish by the late Mr. Fred Hall, a local farmer, whose ancestors can be traced back to the 18th century in the area.

A Parish Council was formed in 1956, taking the place of the old parish meeting, It consists of seven members. Meetings are held once a month in the Chapel school room when matters of local interest are debated and discussed.

In the original village there are many old properties including some which are 'listed'. In recent years new residential development has taken place which has dramatically increased the population. The situation of the rural Village of Carlton, so near to the large industrial area of Teesside has made it a convenient and desirable residential district.

Carlton was for many years part of the Rural District of Stockton-on-Tees which was in 1972 amalgamated into the new County of Cleveland. The population in 1841 was 157, and in 1990 it was 550. A strong community spirit still prevails, primarily through the efforts of the Women's Institute, the Church, and the chapel.

== Public services ==
The village is home to a sports field with children's play area, a village green, WI hall, a chapel and a post office.

== Notable people ==
George Orwell resided at Greystone, the home of his wife Eileen's sister-in-law and about half a mile outside the village, from 1944 to 1945. He moved there with Eileen and newly adopted son, Richard, following bomb damage to their London flat. The then housekeeper, Mrs Blackburn, remembers Orwell reading in the garden or sitting in the bay window of the drawing-room reading or making notes. This room overlooked Whitton valley, made up of rural farmland with woodland in the distance, as well as the Whitton Bridge Pasture. It was here that Orwell finished his anti-Stalinist allegory Animal Farm before leaving for France as a war correspondent in 1945.

Mary Elizabeth Andrew, lifelong resident of Carlton, served as clerk to the parish council for 62 years, 1938–2000. There is a commemorative bench and stone on the greens in the village.
