= MG5 =

MG5 or MG 5 may refer to:

- British NVC community MG5, a community type in the British National Vegetation Classification system
- Heckler & Koch MG5, a machine gun, Germany
- Two different models sold by SAIC Motor:
  - MG5, a small family car sold in China
  - Roewe i5, a subcompact car exported as the MG5
