= Whitton, County Durham =

Village in County Durham, England

Coordinates: 54.599°N 1.408°W

Whitton
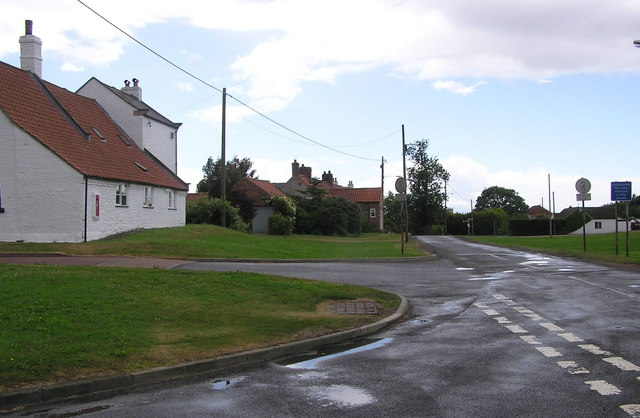

- Location within County Durham
- OS grid reference: NZ383228
- Civil parish: Stillington and Whitton
- Unitary authority: Stockton-on-Tees
- Ceremonial county: Durham
- Region: North East
- Country: England
- Sovereign state: United Kingdom
- Post town: STOCKTON-ON-TEES
- Postcode district: TS21
- Police: Cleveland
- Fire: Cleveland
- Ambulance: North East
- UK Parliament: Stockton North

Whitton is a village and former civil parish, now in the parish of Stillington and Whitton, the borough of Stockton-on-Tees and the ceremonial county of Durham, England. It is situated to the north west of Stockton-on-Tees, near Stillington and Thorpe Thewles.

== Landmarks ==
Approximately 500 metres (1,600 ft) to the south of the village is Whitton Bridge Pasture, a 3.2-hectare (7.9-acre) Site of Special Scientific Interest notable for its species-rich grassland.

== Civil parish ==
Whitton was formerly a township in the parish of Grindon, from 1866 Whitton was a civil parish in its own right, on 1 April 1983 part of the parish of Stillington was merged with Whitton, on 1 July 1983 the merged parish was renamed "Stillington & Whitton". In 1961 the parish of Whitton (prior to the merge) had a population of 913.
