= JUICE (software) =

JUICE is a non-commercial software package for editing and analysing phytosociological data.

It was developed at the Masaryk University in Brno, Czech Republic in 1998, and is fully described in an English manual. It makes use of the previously-developed TURBOVEG software for entering and storing such data, and performs vegetation data analysis, including:

- creation of synoptic tables
- determination of diagnostic species according to their fidelity
- calculation of Ellenberg indicator values for relevés, various indices of alpha and beta diversity
- classification of relevés using TWINSPAN or cluster analysis
- expert system for vegetation classification based on COCKTAIL method etc.

== See also ==
- Phytosociology
- Phytogeography
- Biogeography
