= Whinney Hill, County Durham =

Coordinates: 54.565°N 1.409°W

Whinney Hill
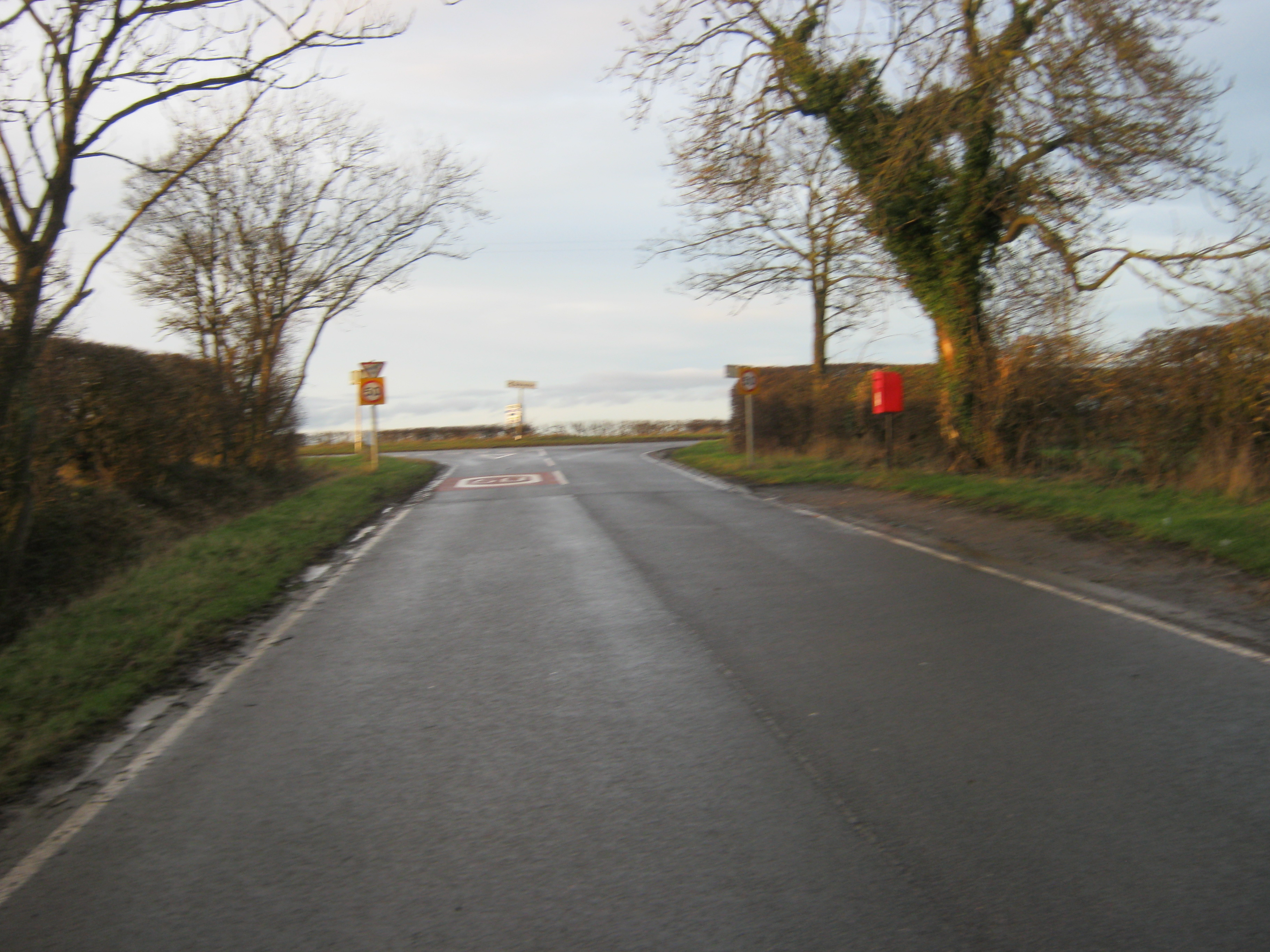
- Sandy Leas Lane joining Darlington Back Lane at Whinney Hill

- Location within County Durham
- Civil parish: Redmarshall; Elton
- Unitary authority: Stockton-on-Tees
- Ceremonial county: Durham
- Region: North East
- Country: England
- Sovereign state: United Kingdom
- Police: Cleveland
- Fire: Cleveland
- Ambulance: North East

Whinney Hill is a village in the civil parishes of Redmarshall and Elton, in the borough of Stockton-on-Tees and the ceremonial county of Durham, England. Whinney Hill lies 2 miles (3.2 km) west of Stockton-on-Tees.
