= Stillington, County Durham =

Village in County Durham, England

Coordinates: 54.605°N 1.422°W

Stillington
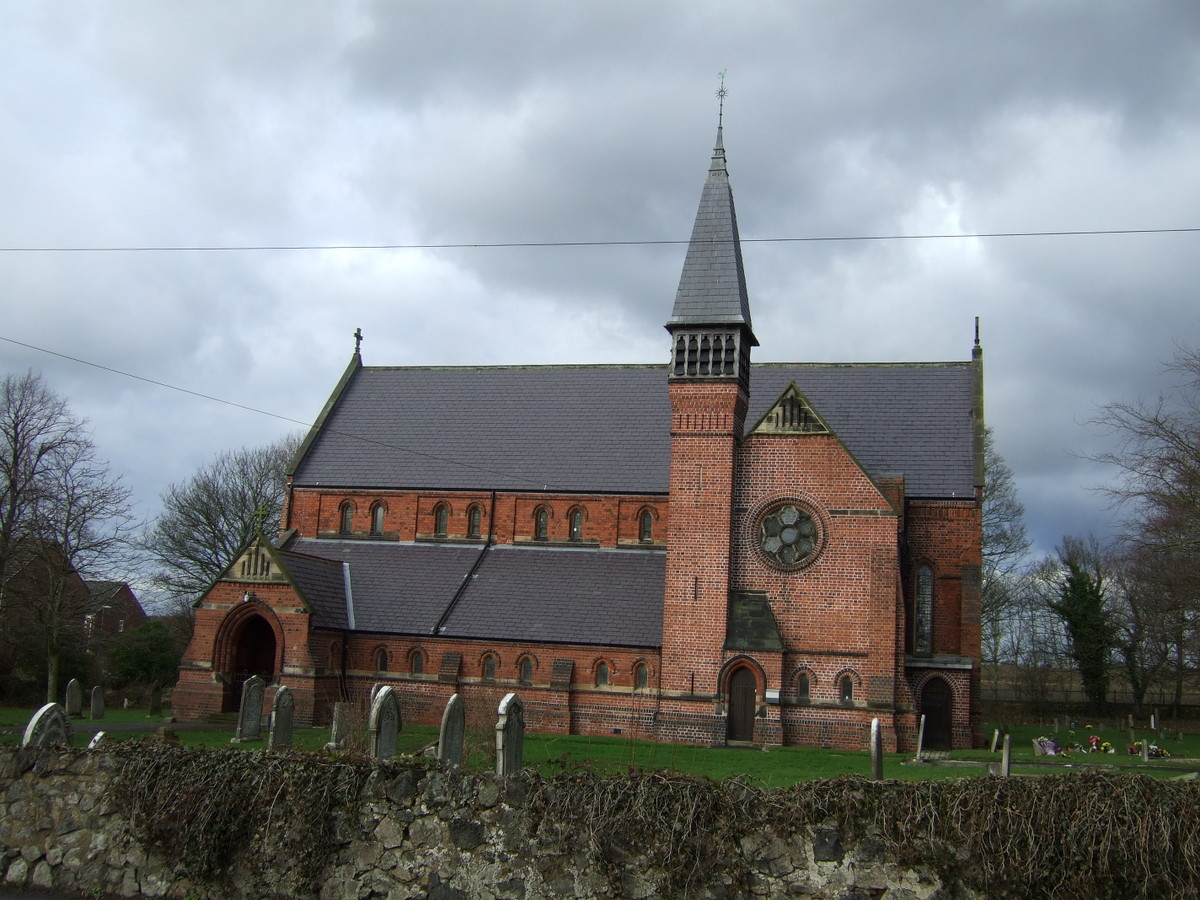

- Location within County Durham
- Population: 1,407
- OS grid reference: NZ374234
- Civil parish: Stillington and Whitton
- Unitary authority: Stockton-on-Tees
- Ceremonial county: Durham
- Region: North East
- Country: England
- Sovereign state: United Kingdom
- Post town: STOCKTON-ON-TEES
- Postcode district: TS21
- Dialling code: 01740
- Police: Cleveland
- Fire: Cleveland
- Ambulance: North East
- UK Parliament: Stockton West

Stillington is a village and former civil parish, now in the parish of Stillington and Whitton, in the Stockton-on-Tees district, in the ceremonial county of Durham, England, northwest of Stockton-on-Tees.

== Governance ==
Stillington is under the jurisdiction of Stockton-On-Tees Borough Council and is represented by Councillor Andrew Stephenson, who sits on the council as member for the Western Parishes, which incorporates the neighbouring villages of Redmarshall, Carlton, Elton and Longnewton, amongst others. Stillington is within the Stockton North parliamentary constituency, currently represented by Alex Cunningham MP.

Stillington was for centuries governed as part of County Durham and along with its neighbouring villages formed the sub-division of the Stockton Rural District under the administration of Durham County Council. Following the Local Government Act 1972, which instituted wholesale changes to England's historic county system, the Rural District was transferred into the borough of Stockton-on-Tees and placed under the authority of the newly created County of Cleveland in 1974. In 1993 the Banham Commission recommended the abolition of County Cleveland, with the River Tees being re-established as the boundary between the ceremonial counties of Durham and Yorkshire. The changes came into effect on 1 April 1996. Stillington remains in the Borough of Stockton-on-Tees but for ceremonial purposes is under the remit of the Lord Lieutenant of Durham and considered to be a part of ceremonial County Durham, although the village is still served by the emergency services of the former county of Cleveland, namely Cleveland Police and Cleveland Fire Brigade.

=== Civil parish ===
Stillington was formerly a township in the parish of Redmarshall, from 1866 Stillington was a civil parish in its own right, on 1 April 1983 the parish was abolished and merged with Whitton and Mordon. In 1961 the parish had a population of 162.

== Economy ==
In 1866 Samuel Boston founded the Carlton Iron works after which 111 houses were built (prior to which there were only three) and Stillington was known as the village of Carlton Iron Works.

In 1932 the original blast furnace was demolished but the company still exists and operates in Stillington under the name of Metabrasive. Stillington has a significant number of companies operating in the village given its size including Darchem Engineering (part of Esterline), Clarkes of Stillington (steel plates) and Bodycote Heat Treatments.

== Nature Reserve ==
Near the church in Stillington, there is a renovated piece of land, that used to be a slag heap, and later a waste dump. In 2004 it was turned into Stillington Forest Park and designated a Local Nature Reserve. It has two main ponds, one of which contains species of freshwater fish which is a popular angling spot. There is a wooded area towards the top of the hill, which has a pathway leading through it, and is a wildlife hotspot. The landscape is mainly grassland, with patches of woodland.

== Wind Farm ==
In September 2010 a planning application for four wind turbines with a maximum height of 125m situated 1 km west of Stillington was submitted by Banks Group. In December 2011 this application was granted.

== Transport ==
In 1833 the Clarence Railway was opened passing through Stillington and was used by the iron companies to transport their products as well as for passenger services. A station was built at Stillington in 1838 but it was demolished in 1965 following a fire. The Clarence Railway eventually became part of the London and North Eastern Railway and still exists today.

The village was linked to Stockton-on-Tees and Middlesbrough via the hourly X8 bus service which was operated by Stagecarriage, which provided the village with a direct link to University Hospital of North Tees, Stockton railway station, Stockton town centre, Teesside Park and Middlesbrough. However this was withdrawn in July 2019 when Stagecarriage ceased trading. One of the village's previous service was provided by Arriva North East, with certain journeys continuing onto Middlesbrough via Stockton. This service was withdrawn in June 2014. Following the withdrawal of all Leven Valley services on 20 March 2015 route 84 was taken on by Stagecarriage. The village's current services are provided by Stagecoach with their 'Tees Flex' Demand Responsive Transport service. This allows residents to book a bus through a smartphone app or by calling a phone number. This started in early 2020 and is on a three-year trial basis from the Tees Valley Combined Authority. This also allows residents to have a wider choice of destinations as the service runs to where the passenger selects on the app. Previously a bus service running to Darlington passed through the village, but this service was withdrawn in late 2012 following the cessation of subsidies provided by Durham County Council.

== Education ==
As of 2011 William Cassidi Church of England Aided Primary School had 204 pupils, aged 3–11. In 2008 Ofsted judged the school to be good and this rating was maintained in the 2011 interim inspection.

== Religious sites ==
The parish church of St John the Divine was built in 1880.
