= British NVC community MG9 =

UK plant community type

British NVC community MG9 (Holcus lanatus - Deschampsia cespitosa grasslands) is one of the mesotrophic grassland communities in the British National Vegetation Classification system. It is one of three communities associated with poorly drained permanent pastures.

It is a widespread community throughout the British lowlands. There are two subcommunities.

== Community composition ==
The following constant species are found in this community:

- Tufted Hair-grass (Deschampsia cespitosa ssp. cespitosa)
- Yorkshire-fog (Holcus lanatus)

No rare species are associated with this community.

== Distribution ==
This community is widespread in lowlands throughout Britain.

== Subcommunities ==
There are two subcommunities:

- the Poa trivialis subcommunity
- the Arrhenatherum elatius subcommunity
