= British NVC community MG5 =

UK plant community type

British NVC community MG5 is one of the mesotrophic grassland communities in the British National Vegetation Classification system, and the main community that makes up lowland hay meadows. Such flower-rich meadows were once very widespread and extensive, but they are now highly localised and generally restricted to the upland fringes and to nature reserves.

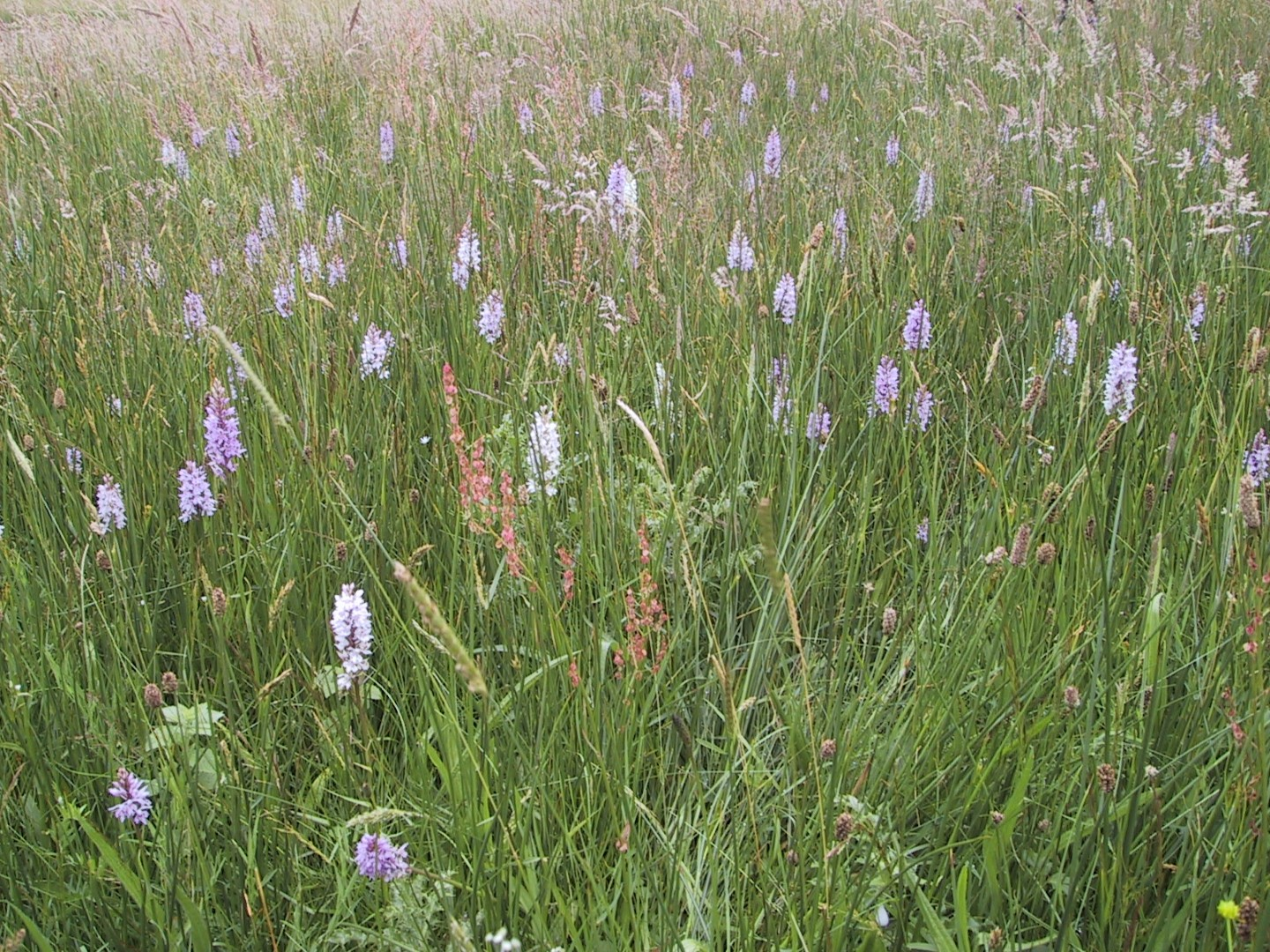
Orchid-rich MG5 meadow on Haughmond Hill, Shropshire

== Description ==
MG5 Cynosurus cristatus-Centaurea nigra meadows are the traditional hay meadows on circumneutral soils throughout the lowlands of Britain. The ancient, species-rich "old meadows" are characterised by a sward that is rich in forbs and orchids amongst fine grasses such as red fescue, crested dog's-tail and common bent. More recently established meadows are very likely to be of this community if they are on neutral soils, but are likely to be much less species-rich.

Other constant species found in this community include sweet vernal-grass, black knapweed, bird's-foot trefoil, ribwort plantain, and both red and white clover.

Uncommon species that are typical of old MG5 meadows include adder's-tongue fern, green-winged orchid and dyer's greenweed. tuberous thistle is a rarity of meadows in Wiltshire, and Meadow saffron is abundant in some MG5 meadows in Worcestershire.

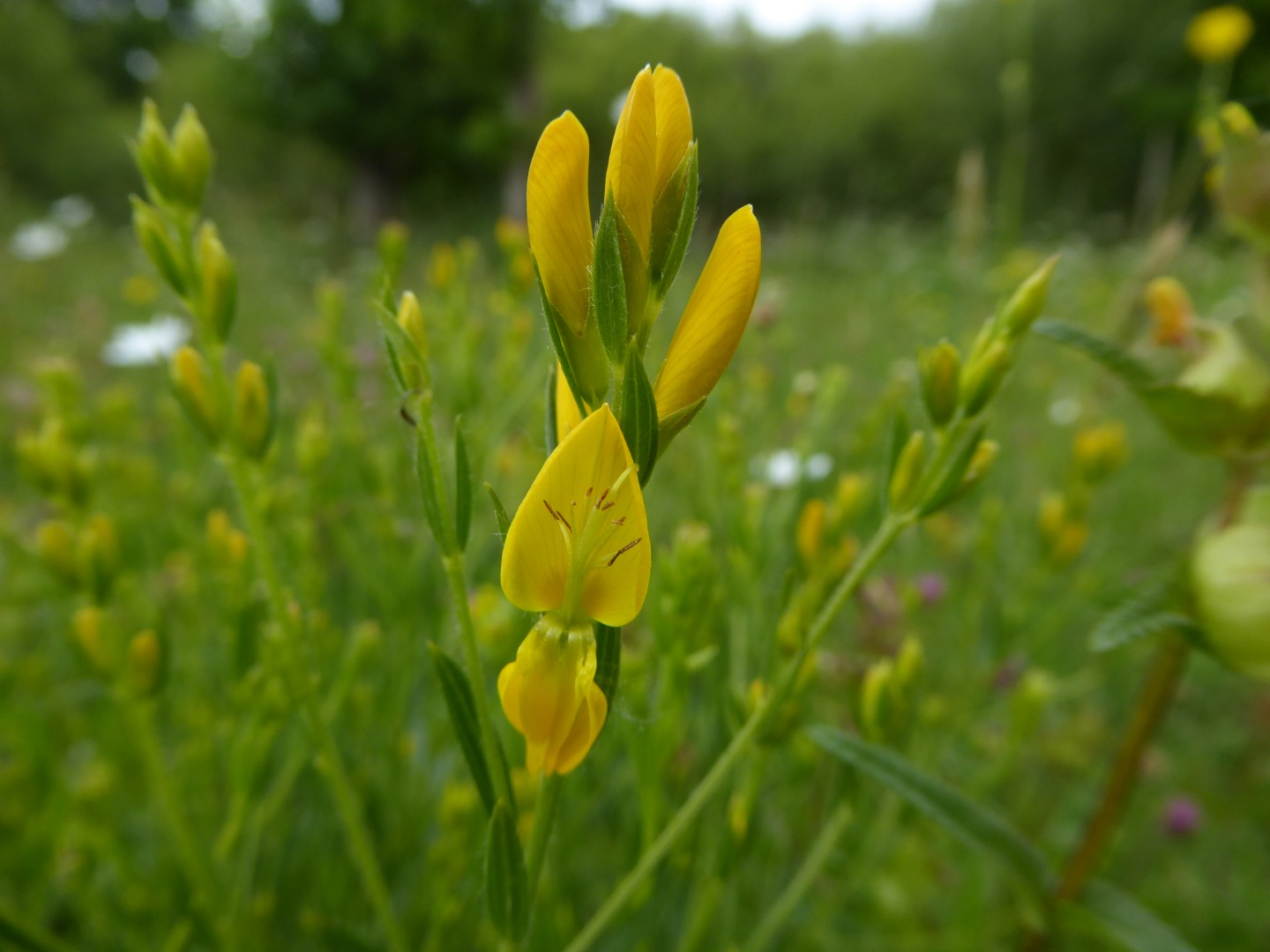
Dyer's greenweed is typical of ancient MG5 meadows

There are three subcommunities:

- MG5a Lathyrus pratensis subcommunity occurs on neutral soils and is typical of this type of meadow;
- MG5b Galium verum subcommunity is found on slightly calcareous substrates and includes such plants as glaucous sedge and salad burnet;
- MG5c Danthonia decumbens subcommunity is the more acidic variant and may contain devil's-bit scabious, betony and bitter vetch.

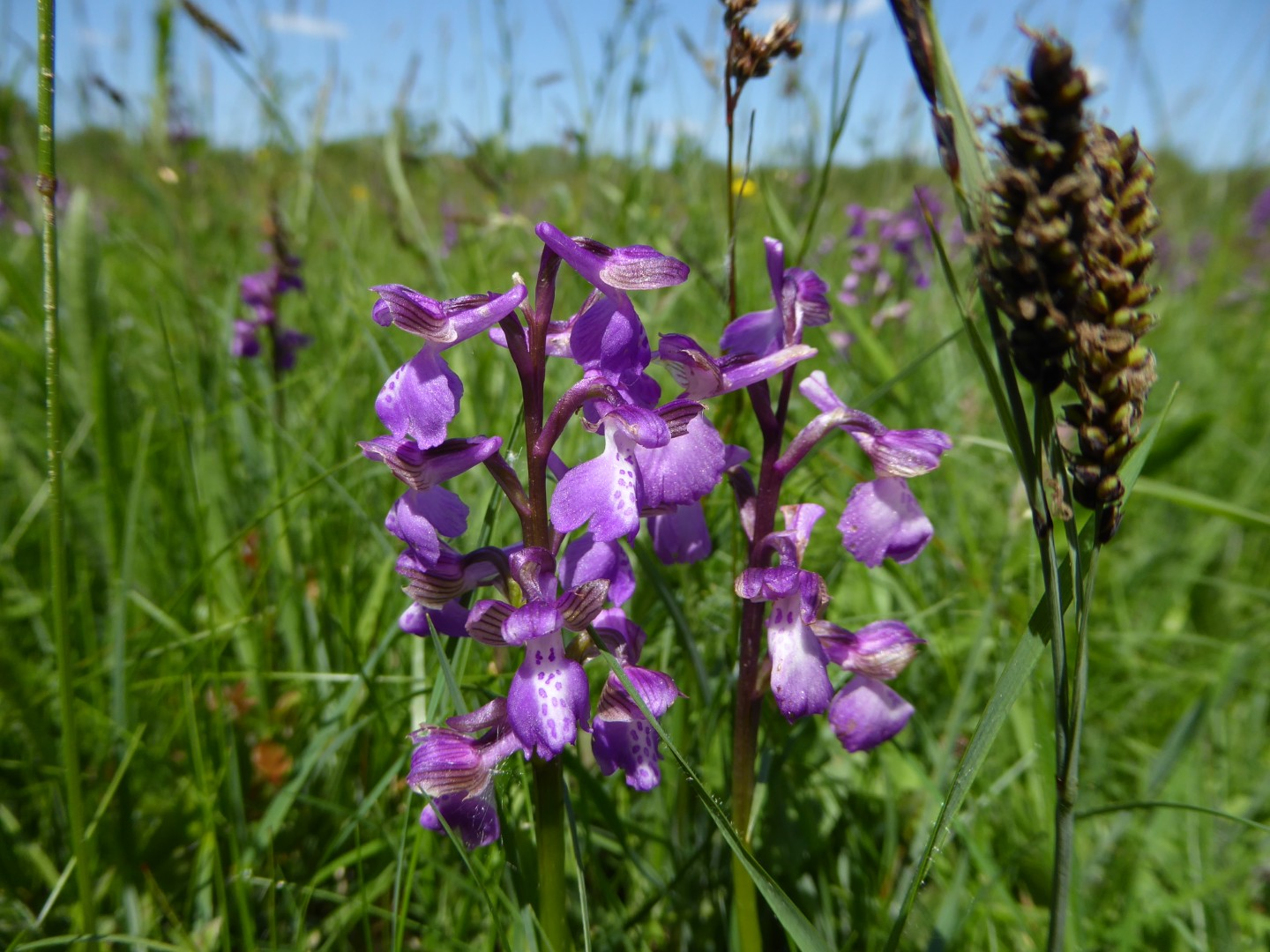
Green-winged orchid in an MG5 meadow in Kent

== Distribution and status ==
This community is widespread in lowland areas in England, Wales and Scotland, but its abundance varies between regions. It is uncommon in southern England and East Anglia, for instance, but strong concentrations occur in the Midlands and Yorkshire.

Until the 1940s there were many MG5 meadows in Britain, but agricultural intensification has caused the loss of an estimated 97% of them by 2007. Originally, there must have been about 300,000 ha, but this is now reduced to less than 10,000 ha. There are, however, still hundreds of MG5 meadows in some counties.

Many old MG5 meadows are nature reserves, sites of special scientific interest or county wildlife sites.

== Zonation and succession ==
Many MG5 meadows have a fringe of MG1 Arrhenatherum elatius grassland, where leaf litter from hedges enrich the soil. In damp areas there may be hollows or wet corners with MG8 Caltha palustris grassland or M23 Juncus effusus rush-pasture. Some meadows appear to be derived from W8 Fraxinus excelsior woodland and contain characteristic woodland plants such as twayblade and wood anemone; neglected stands generally scrub over to become W8 woodland again.

Agricultural improvement typically leads initially towards MG6 Lolium perenne grassland, which has been the fate of most old meadows.

== Other treatments ==
MG5 meadows were largely taken for granted in the early ecology texts, and barely warrant a mention in Tansley's The British Islands and their Vegetation. This could be partly due to their scarcity around Oxford and Cambridge. Authors studying more westerly areas tend to give MG5 greater prominence.

In Europe, the equivalent of MG5 is habitat 2.1 Permanent mesotrophic pastures and aftermath-grazed meadows, which incorporates many other types of grassland. Scottish ecologists have proposed an E2.112 Atlantic Cynosurus-Centaurea pastures to account for MG5 specifically, although of course they are usually meadows, not pasture. A similar (but more general) grassland type can be found in Brittany and Normandy, prairies mésophiles de fauche à Fromental (neutral oatgrass haymeadows), which often contain Gaudinia fragilis.
