= British NVC community MG1 =

UK plant community type

NVC community MG1 is one of the mesotrophic grassland communities in the British National Vegetation Classification system, characterised by the abundance of rank grasses and tall herbs in an ungrazed and infrequently cut sward. It was once very widespread and extensive, but is now much more localised and restricted to edge habitats such as road verges, field margins and unmanaged land. It is familiar to many as "the long grass you used to play in as a child", and it can be found throughout the lowlands and upland fringes of Britain; there are similar vegetation communities that occur throughout Europe.

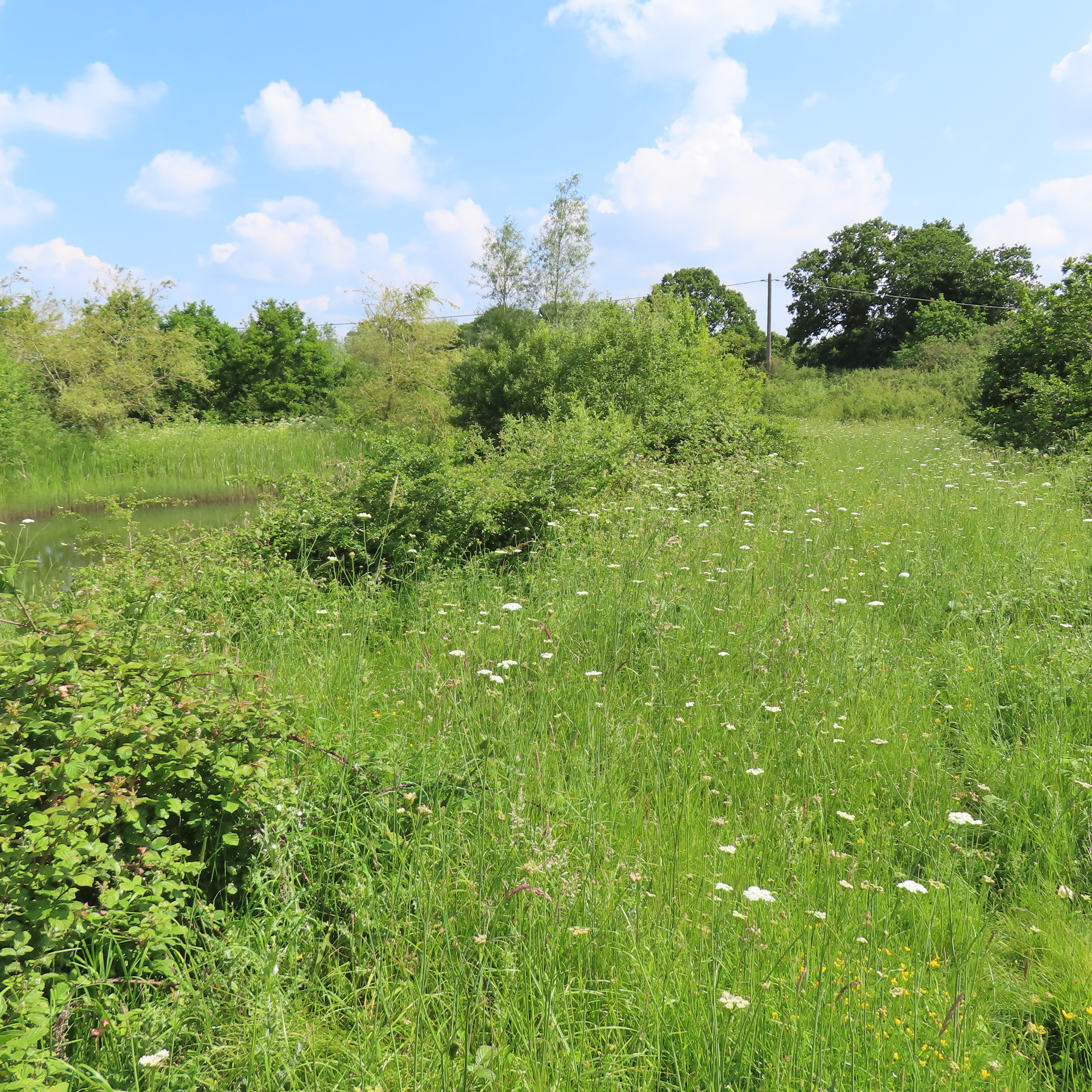
A meadow of MG1 Arrhenatherum elatius grassland in Kent

== Description ==
MG1 Arrhenatherum elatius grassland is often, but not always, characterised by an abundance of false oat-grass and, in the most typical form, cow parsley. It does, however, take many forms, because this community can used to describe almost any ungrazed and rarely mown stand of tall grasses and herbs on well-drained, mesotrophic soils.

The dominant grasses often include cock's-foot, yorkshire-fog, red fescue, meadow foxtail and - in certain situations - barren brome, upright brome, great brome or tall fescue. Amongst the grasses, and sometimes almost displacing them, can be hogweed, creeping thistle, knapweed or, in particular variants, wild parsnip, meadowsweet, alexanders, sweet cicely, rosebay willowherb or great willowherb.

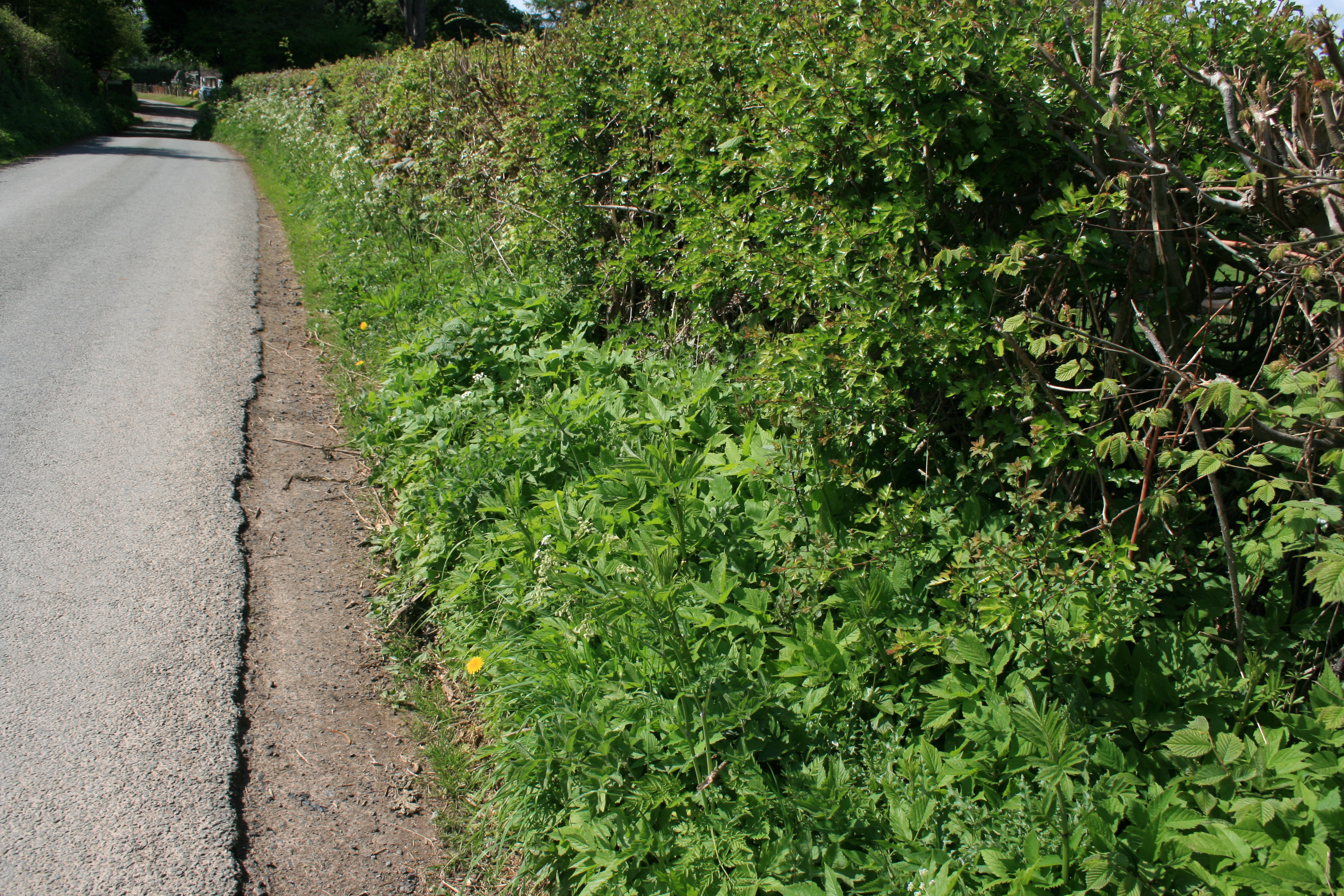
A road verge with strip of MG1 grassland

Nowadays MG1 usually occurs in marginal habitats, field edges, road verges and various types of unmanaged land. There is no standard term for this in English ecological texts, but in France the habitat is known as ourlets and lisières (literally, hems and borders). The ourlets are the edges of roads, paths and streams, whereas the lisières are the unmanaged margins of fields. In the past, however, (and in much of Europe) Arrhenatherum elatius grasslands made up whole meadows and lightly-grazed unenclosed pastures.

MG1 grassland often assumes some of the characteristics of its neighbouring vegetation. For example, an orchard beside a wood might be rich in shade-tolerant plants such as dog's-mercury and lesser celandine, whereas a roadside running through chalk grassland might contain field scabious and common rock-rose.

One rare species, Nottingham catchfly (Silene nutans), is associated with this community.

== Subcommunities ==
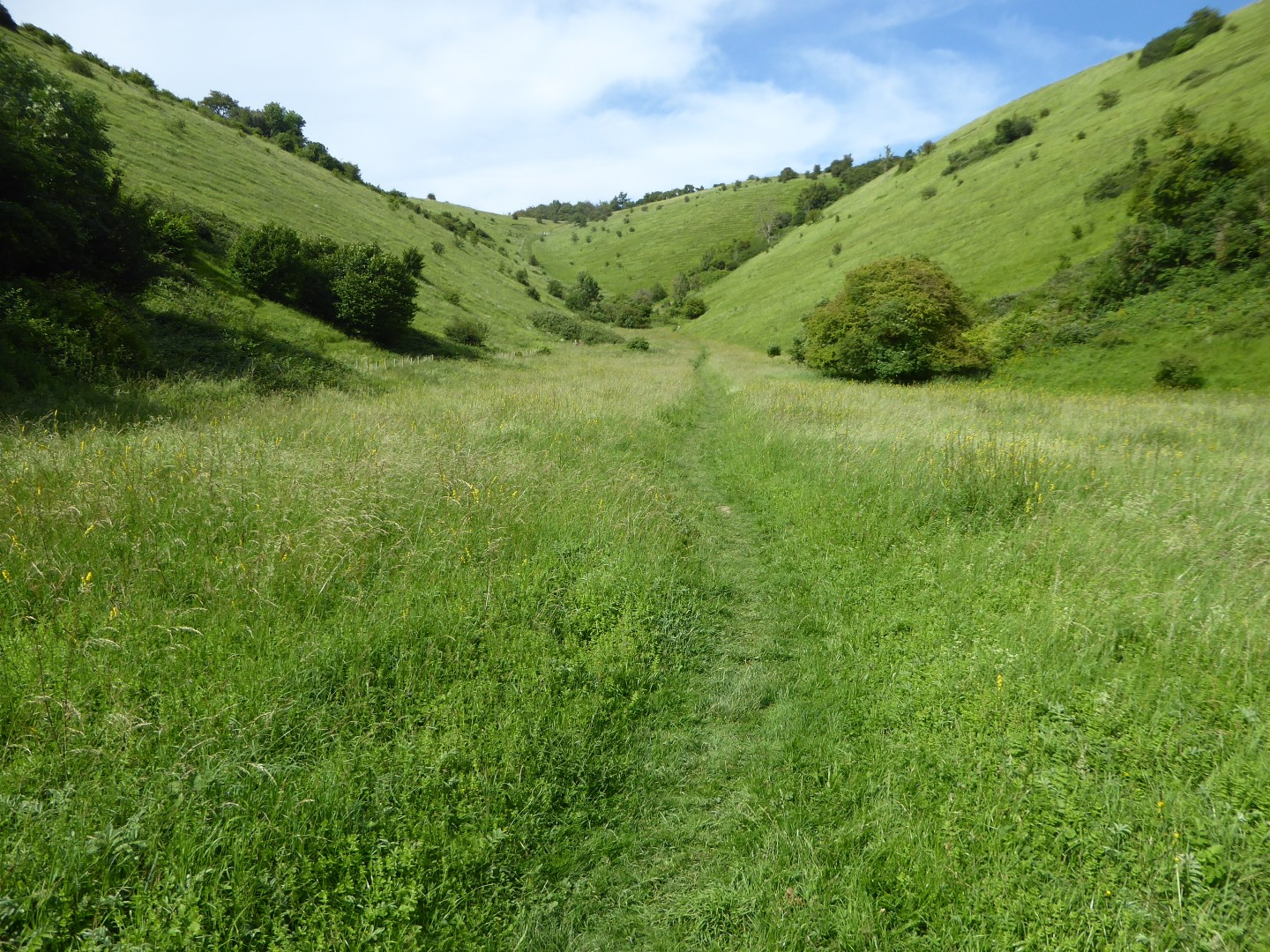
A sward of MG1d wild parsnip grassland at the foot of the Wye Downs, Kent

MG1 grassland is unusual in the number of subcommunities (five, plus nine variants) that have been described, but it could easily have more added to the list. The reason for this diversity is that it is quite a scruffy type of vegetation, taken to be of little value, so it was perhaps not deemed important enough to devote more attention to it. The subcommunities are:

- MG1a Festuca rubra subcommunity, which tends to be very grassy and species-poor, often as a result of having been resown with grass seed mixes on disturbed roadside verges. Within this subcommunity are five variants:
  - Centaurea scabiosa variant, on base-rich soils
  - Geranium pratense variant, on hilly roadsides in northern England
  - Bromus sterilis variant, usually in towns
  - Myrrhis odorata variant, which is highly localised near old habitation, where this herb was previously cultivated
  - Epilobium angustifolium variant, which is characteristic of road verges in Scotland
- MG1b Urtica dioica subcommunity, which is indicative of nutrient enrichment, possibly on arable field margins. It can be further divided into three variants
  - Papaver rhoeas variant, in ploughed fields
  - Artemisia vulgaris variant, on road verges in farmed areas
  - Epilobium hirsutum variant, alongside streams and ditches in farmland
- MG1c Filipendula ulmaria subcommunity, which is found in wet margins of pastures beside rivers
- MG1d Pastinaca sativa subcommunity, which is typical of chalk or limestone grassland, and can be quite species-rich
- MG1e Centaurea nigra subcommunity, which can be a species-rich grassland of neutral to slightly acid soils, and has one variant
  - Pimpinella saxifraga variant, with reduced cover of small plants but increased bryophytes.

== Other treatments ==
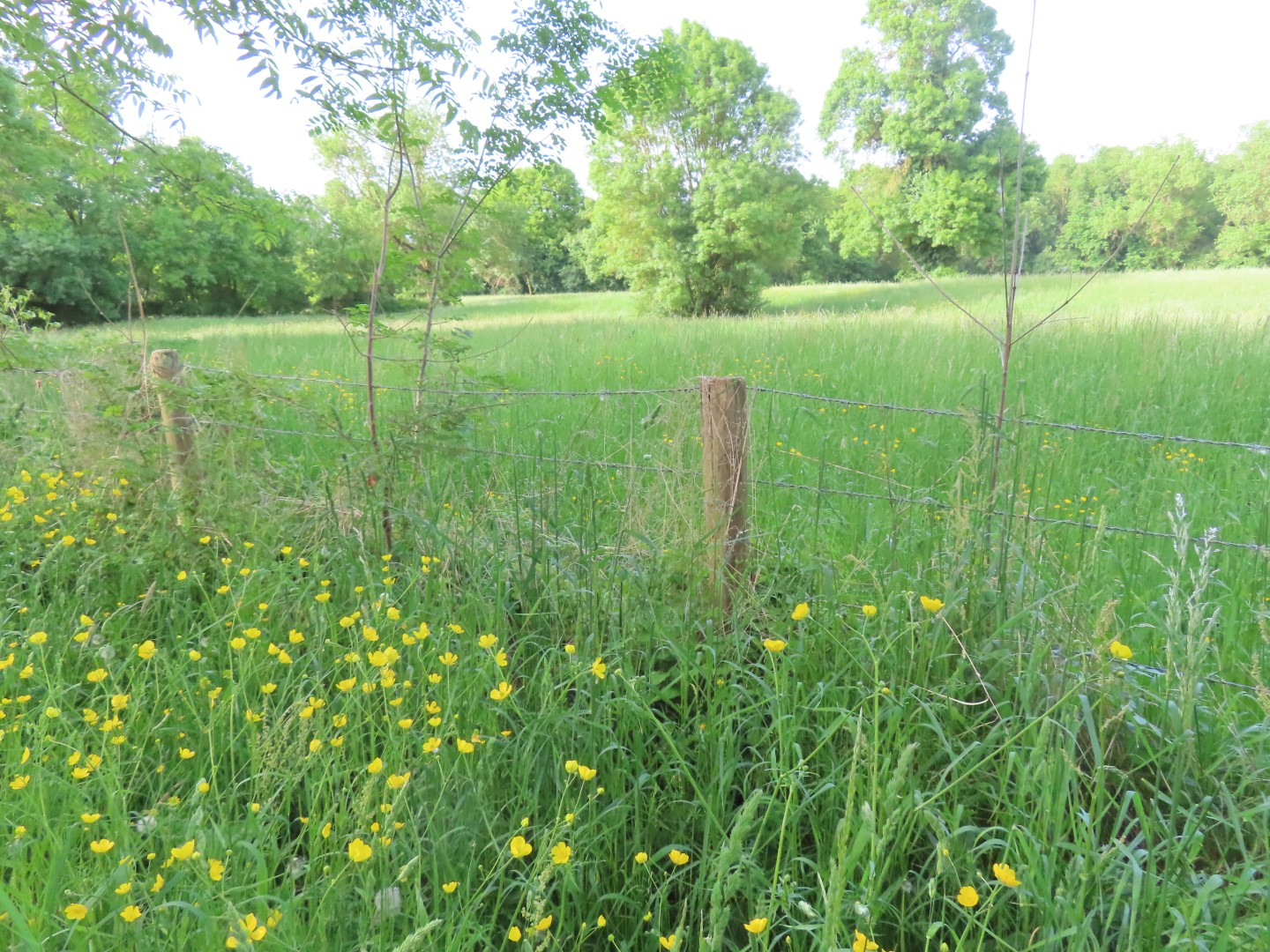
E2.211 Arrhenatherum elatius meadow in Saumur, France

Under the European EUNIS classification system, one type of MG1 grassland is E2.211 Atlantic Arrhenatherum prairies. This community once made up many lightly-grazed meadows in Britain and France, but it has become scarce since the 19th century. A characteristic species is corky-fruited dropwort, and the Flora of Bristol describes how these used to be common in Somerset, but there are none left there now.
