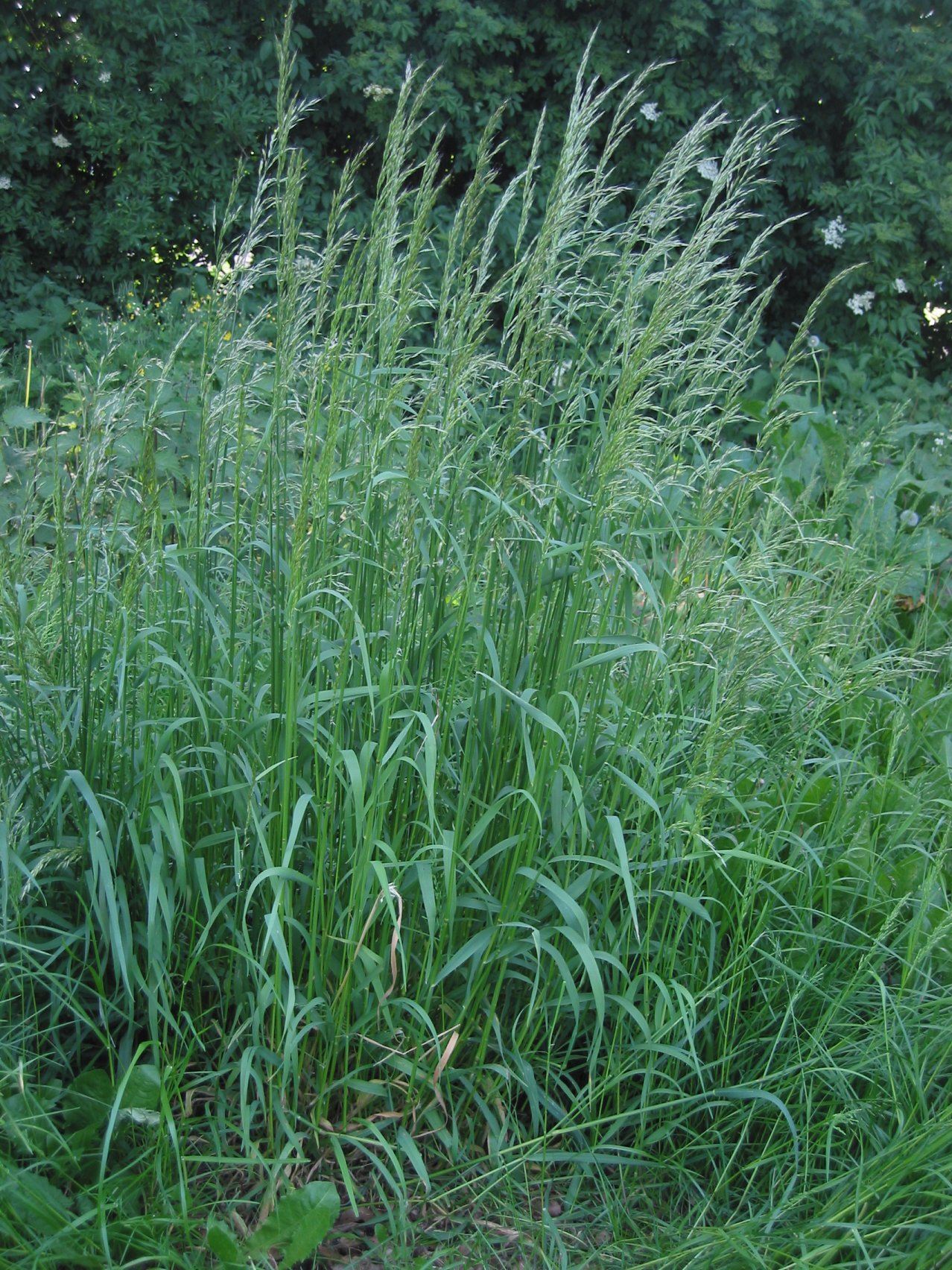

Scientific classification
- Kingdom: Plantae
- Clade: Tracheophytes
- Clade: Angiosperms
- Clade: Monocots
- Clade: Commelinids
- Order: Poales
- Family: Poaceae
- Subfamily: Pooideae
- Genus: Arrhenatherum
- Species: A. elatius

Binomial name
- Arrhenatherum elatius (L.) P.Beauv. ex J.Presl & C.Presl, 1819

= Arrhenatherum elatius =

Species of flowering plant in the grass family

Arrhenatherum elatius is a species of flowering plant in the grass family Poaceae, commonly known as false oat-grass, and also bulbous oat grass (subsp. bulbosum), tall oat-grass, tall meadow oat, onion couch and tuber oat-grass. It is native throughout Europe (including Iceland), and also western and southwestern Asia (south to Jordan and Iran), and northwestern Africa (Morocco to Tunisia). This tufted grass is sometimes used as an ornamental grass and is sometimes marketed as "cat grass".

Outside of its native range it can be found elsewhere as an introduced species. It is found especially in prairies, at the side of roads and in uncultivated fields. The bulbous subspecies can be a weed of arable land. It is palatable grass for livestock and is used both as forage (pasture) and fodder (hay and silage).

== Description ==
This coarse grass can grow to 1.80 m (6 ft) tall. The leaves are 4–10 mm (0–0 in) wide, bright green, broad, slightly hairy, and rough. The ligule is 1–3 mm (0–0 in) long and smooth edged. The panicle is up to 30 cm (12 in), and the bunched spikelets have projecting and angled awns up to 17 mm (1 in) long, green or purplish. The panicles often remain into winter. The spikelets are oblong or gaping. It flowers from June to September. The roots are yellow.

Four subspecies are currently accepted by Kew's Plants of the World:

- Arrhenatherum elatius subsp. elatius, the typical (nominate) subspecies.
- Arrhenatherum elatius subsp. bulbosum (syn. Arrhenatherum tuberosum), onion couch or tuber oat-grass, distinguished by the presence of corms at the base of the stem, by which it propagates. It occurs in vegetated shingle and arable land.
- Arrhenatherum elatius subsp. cypricola (Cyprus, endemic).
- Arrhenatherum elatius subsp. sardoum (western Mediterranean region).

== Habitat ==
Arrhenatherum elatius is a principal species in two UK National Vegetation Classification habitat communities: the very widespread MG1 (Arrhenatherum elatius grassland) and the much rarer MG2 (Arrhenatherum elatius - Filipendula ulmaria tall-herb grassland). This means that it can be found with species such as Dactylis glomerata (also known as cock's-foot and orchard grass), and Filipendula ulmaria (also known as meadow-sweet).

It is found on road verges, along hedges and riverbanks.

It can colonise and stabilise limestone scree, bare calcareous cliffs, maritime shingle and coastal dunes.

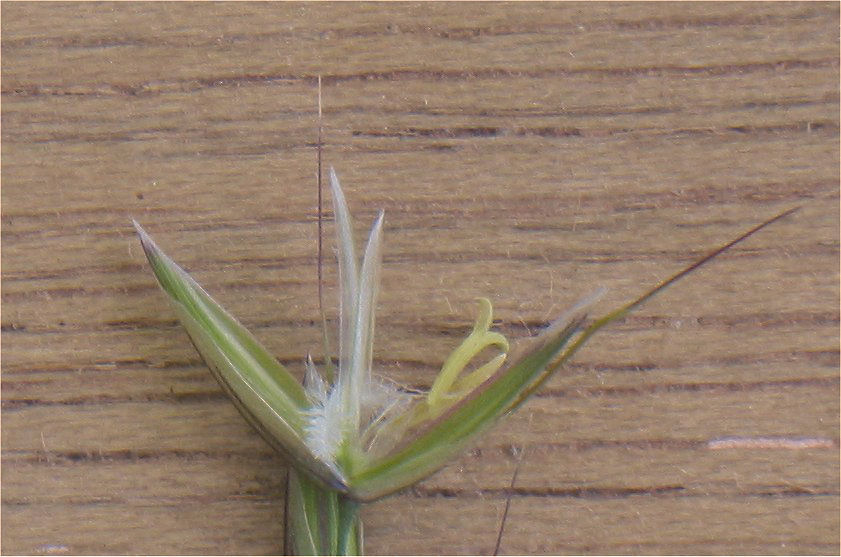
Gaping spikelet and awn

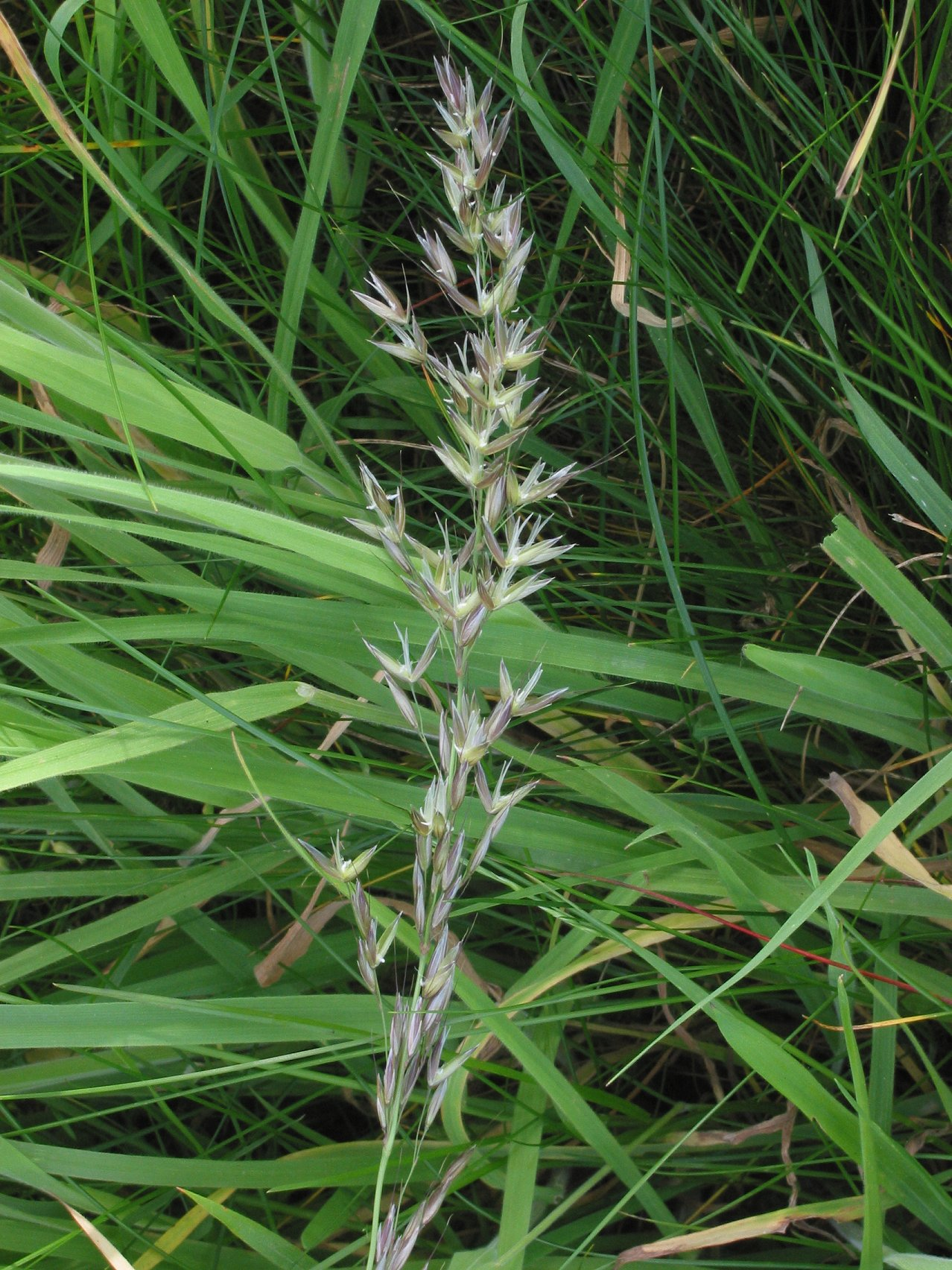
Bunched panicle

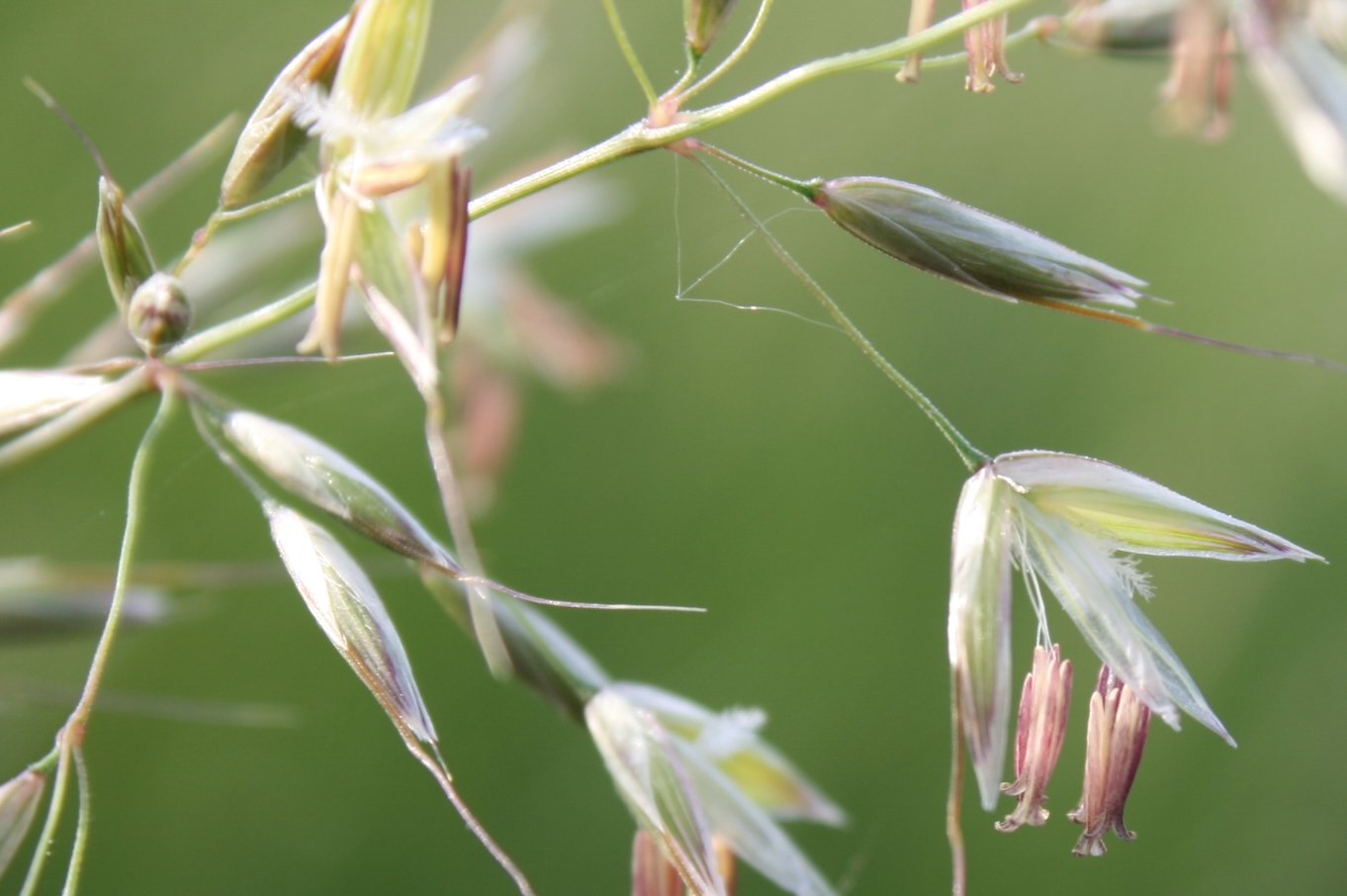
Spikelets

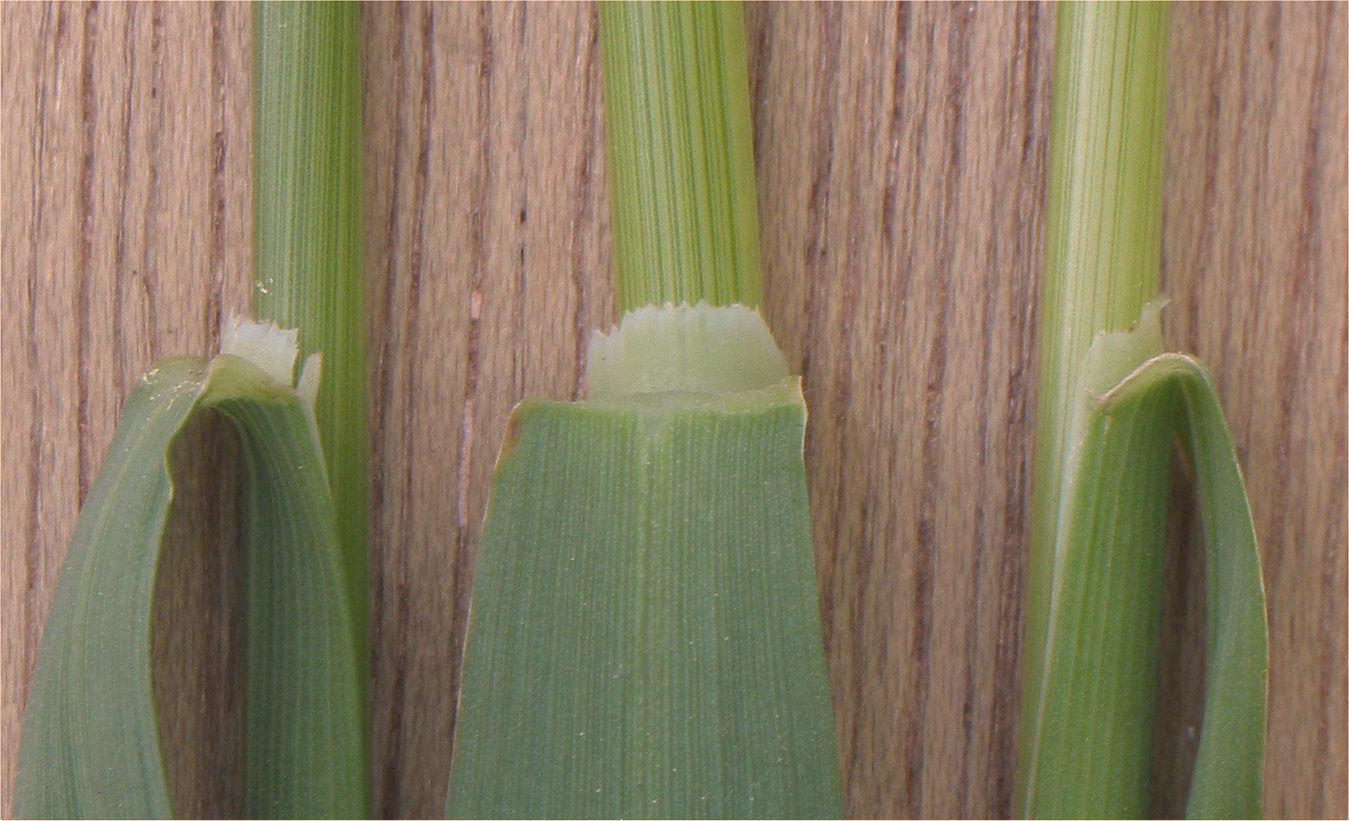
Ligule

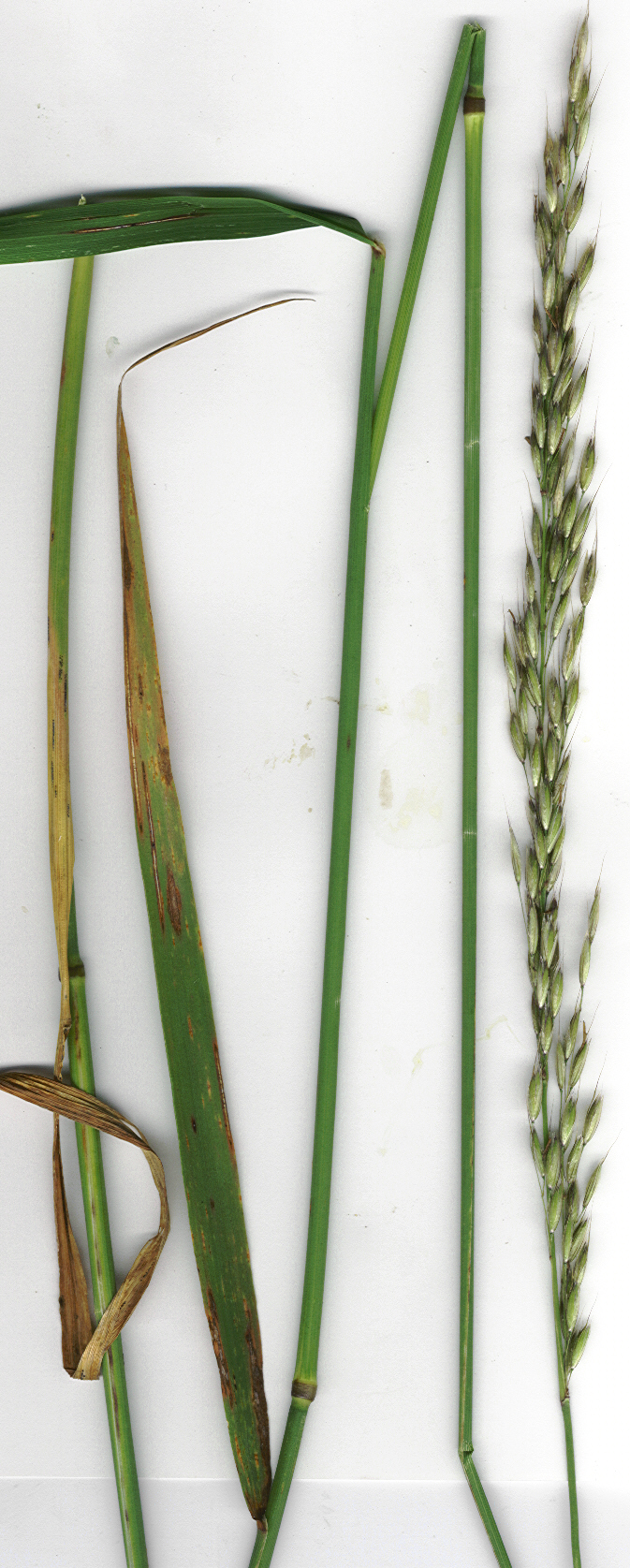
Leaves

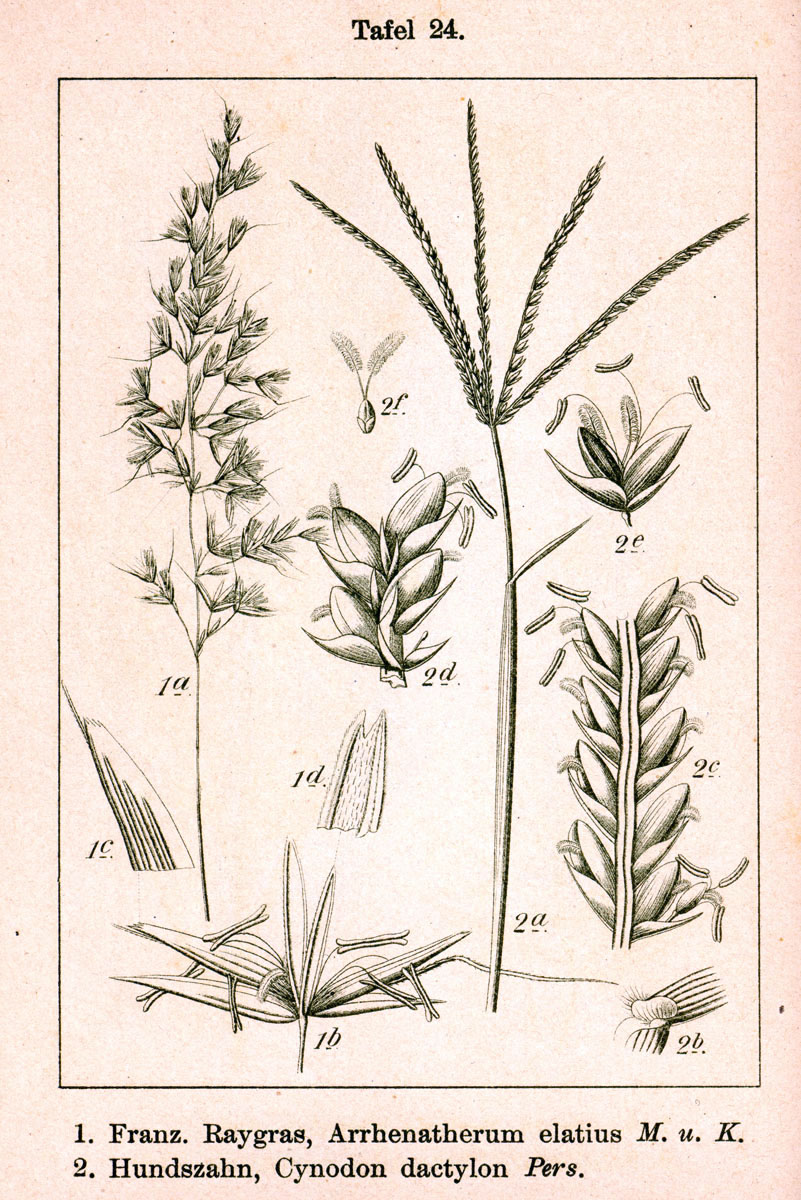
Illustrated features
