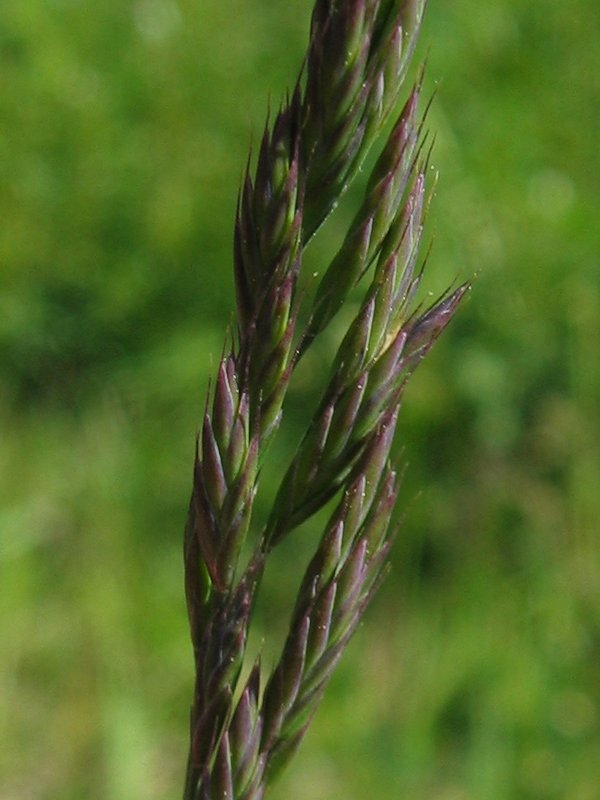
- Spikelets and flowers

Conservation status
- Secure (NatureServe)

Scientific classification
- Kingdom: Plantae
- Clade: Tracheophytes
- Clade: Angiosperms
- Clade: Monocots
- Clade: Commelinids
- Order: Poales
- Family: Poaceae
- Subfamily: Pooideae
- Genus: Festuca
- Species: F. rubra

Binomial name
- Festuca rubra L.

Synonyms
- Festuca arenaria Osbeck; Festuca aurasiaca Trab.; Festuca duriuscula L.

= Festuca rubra =

Species of flowering plant

Festuca rubra is a species of grass known by the common name red fescue, creeping red fescue or the rush-leaf fescue. It is widespread across much of the Northern Hemisphere and can tolerate many habitats and climates. It is best adapted to well-drained soils in cool, temperate climates; it prefers shadier areas and is often planted for its shade tolerance. Wild animals browse it, but it has not been important for domestic forage due to low productivity and palatability. It is also an ornamental plant for gardens. It functions well as a hyperaccumulator plant as well, specifically accumulating arsenic in mine affected soils.

== Description ==
Festuca rubra is perennial and has sub-species that have rhizomes and/or form bunchgrass tufts. It mainly exists in neutral and acidic soils. It can grow between 2 and 20 cm tall.

Like all fescues, the leaves are narrow and needle like, making it less palatable to livestock. The swards that it forms are not as tufted as sheep's fescue (Festuca ovina) or wavy hair grass (Deschampsia flexuosa). The tufted nature is what gives the grass its springy characteristic. The leaves are bright green.

=== Flowers ===
There are 4 to 10 spikelet flowers, which are up to 15 mm long.

The ligule is very short and blunt.

== Cultivation ==
Festuca rubra, as red fescue or creeping red fescue, is cultivated as an ornamental plant for use as a turfgrass and groundcover. It can be left completely unmowed, or occasionally trimmed for a lush meadow-like look. There are many subspecies, and many cultivars have been bred for the horticulture trade.

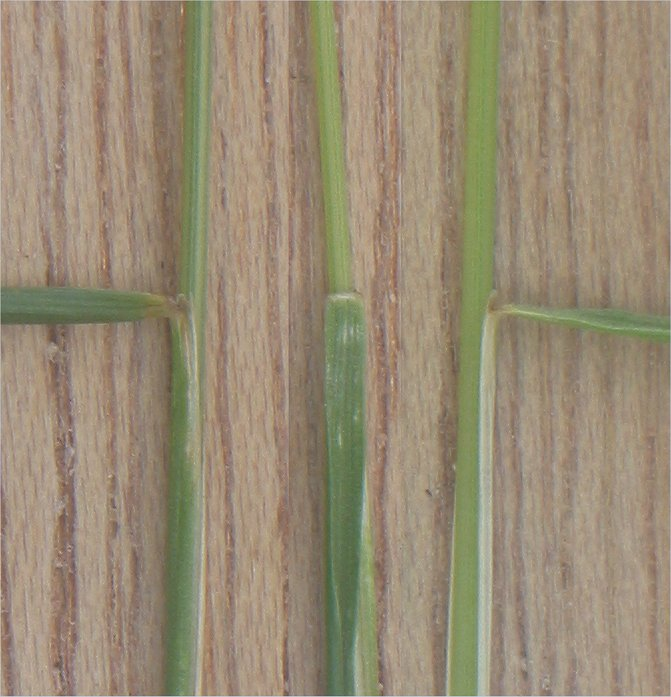
The ligule is very short and blunt.

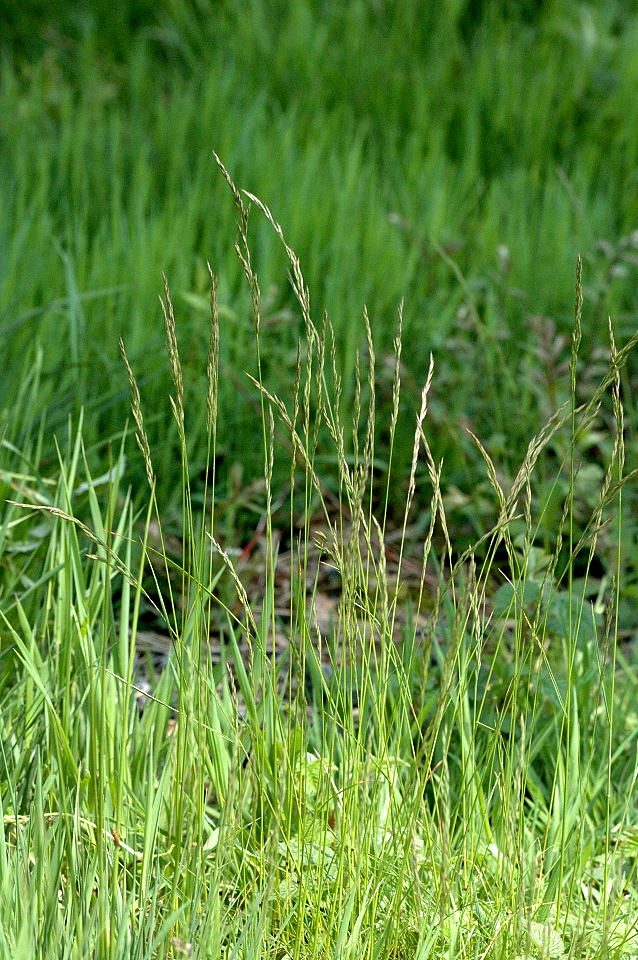
Festuca rubra
