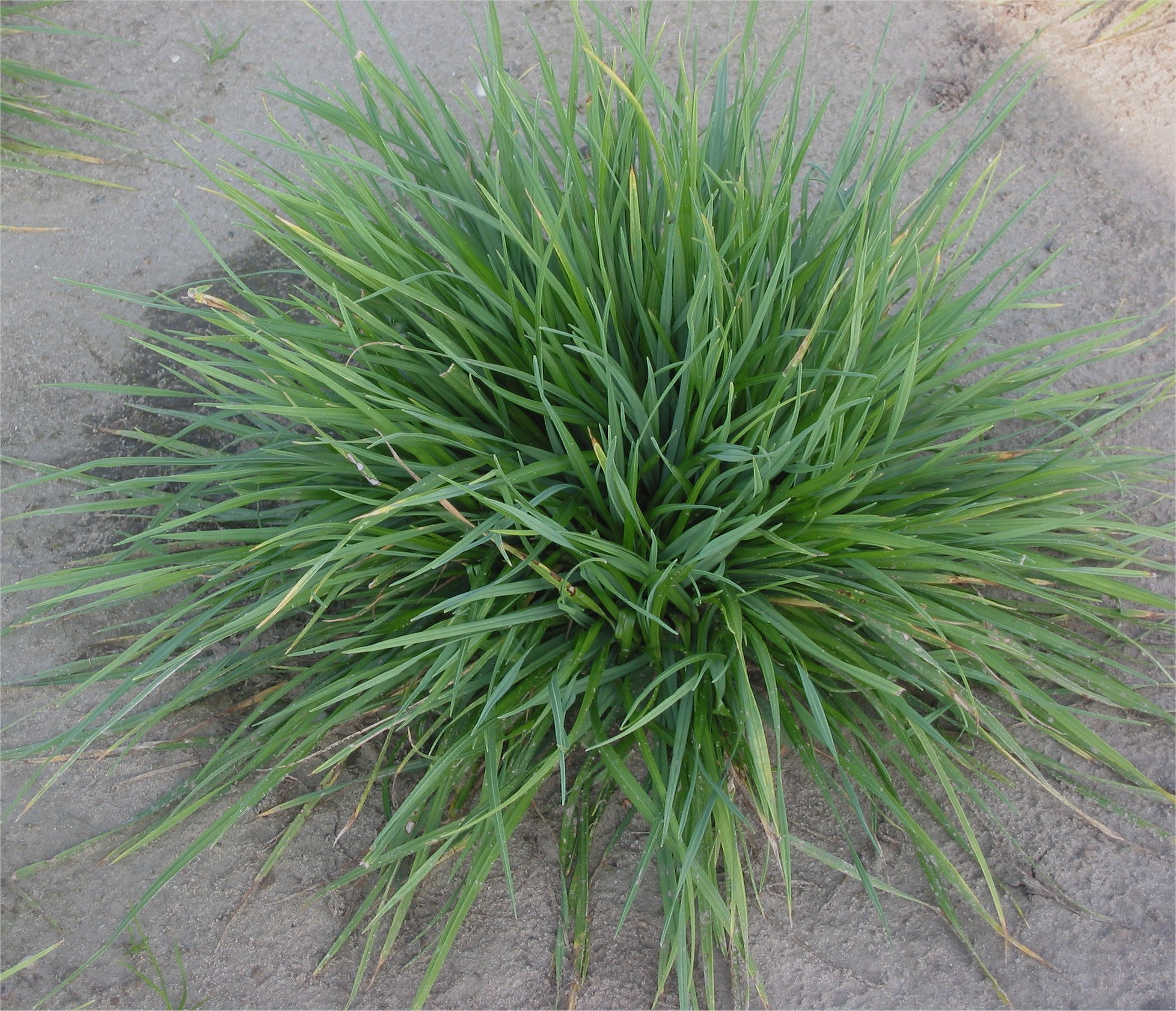

Scientific classification
- Kingdom: Plantae
- Clade: Tracheophytes
- Clade: Angiosperms
- Clade: Monocots
- Clade: Commelinids
- Order: Poales
- Family: Poaceae
- Subfamily: Pooideae
- Genus: Cynosurus
- Species: C. cristatus

Binomial name
- Cynosurus cristatus L.

= Cynosurus cristatus =

Species of grass

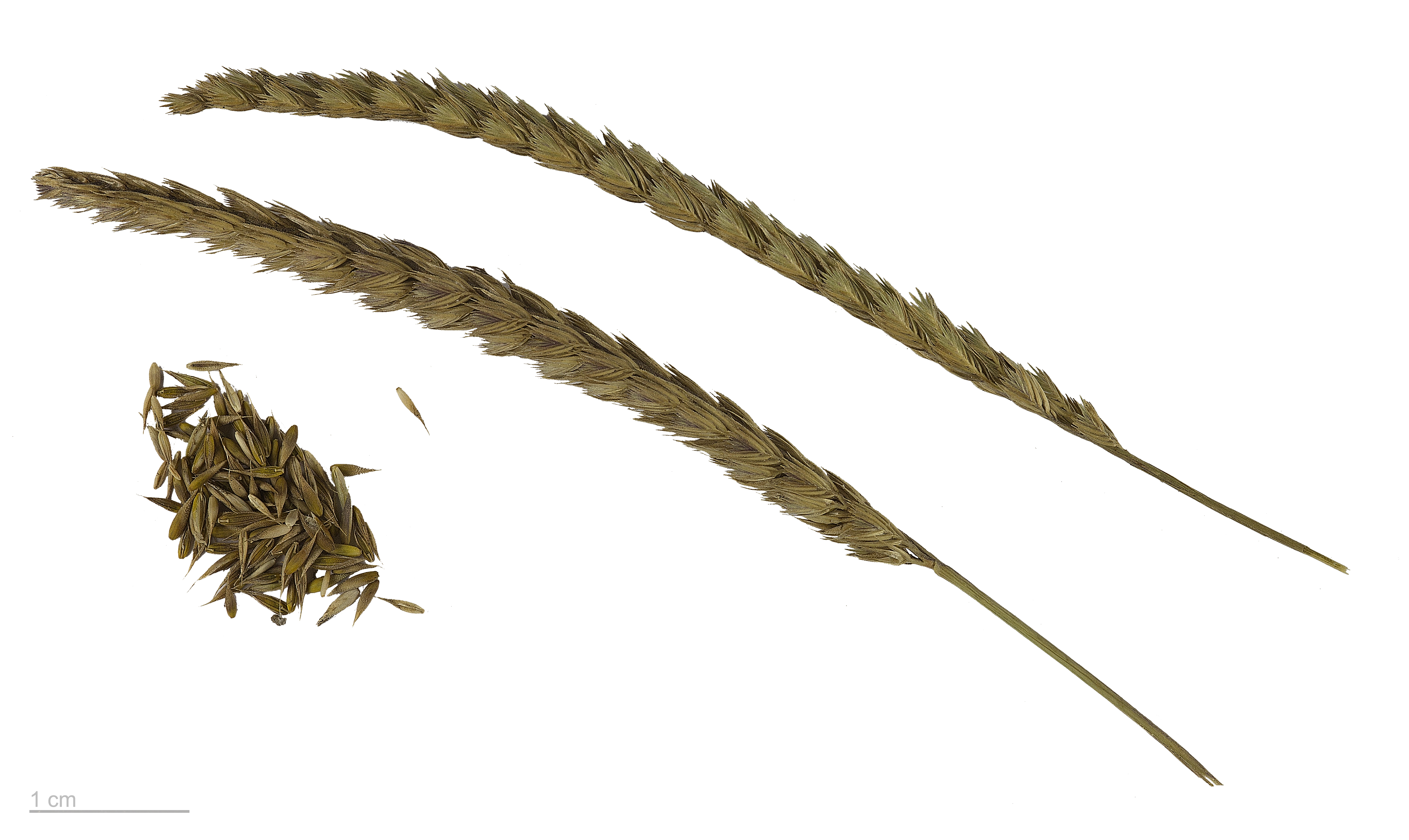
Cynosurus cristatus - MHNT

Cynosurus cristatus, the crested dog's-tail, is a short-lived perennial grass in the family Poaceae, characterised by a seed head that is flat on one side. It typically grows in species rich grassland. It thrives in a variety of soil types but avoids the acid and calcareous extremes of pH, and prefers well drained soils. It may be grown as an ornamental plant.

== Description ==
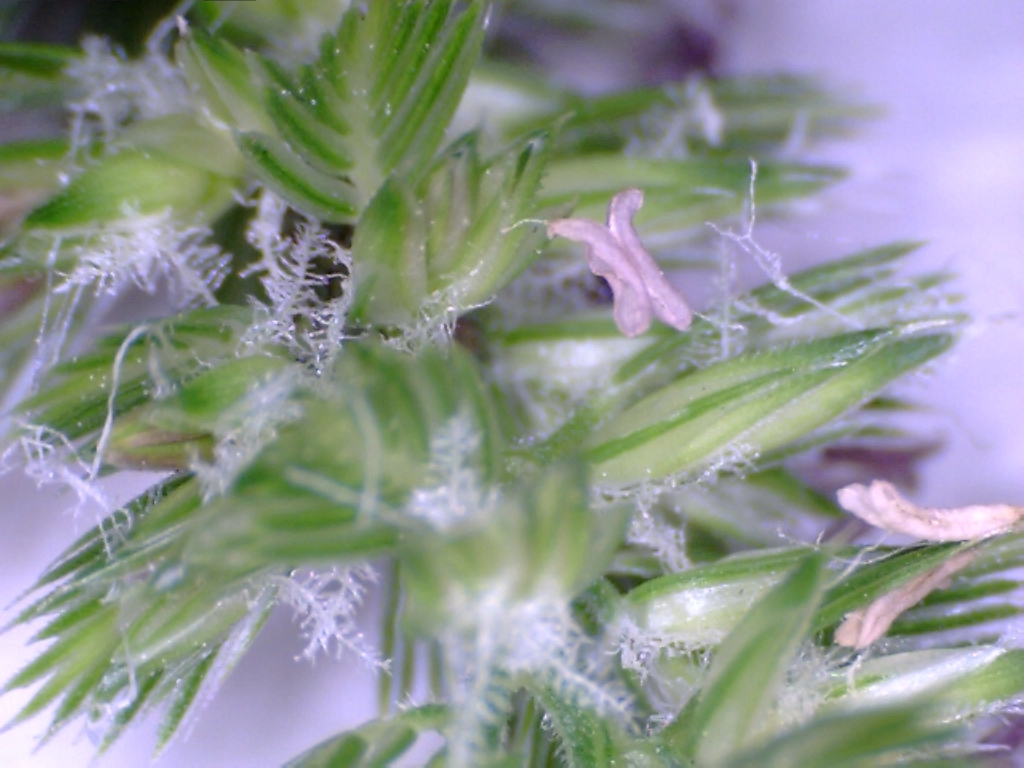
The anthers and stamen in the flower head

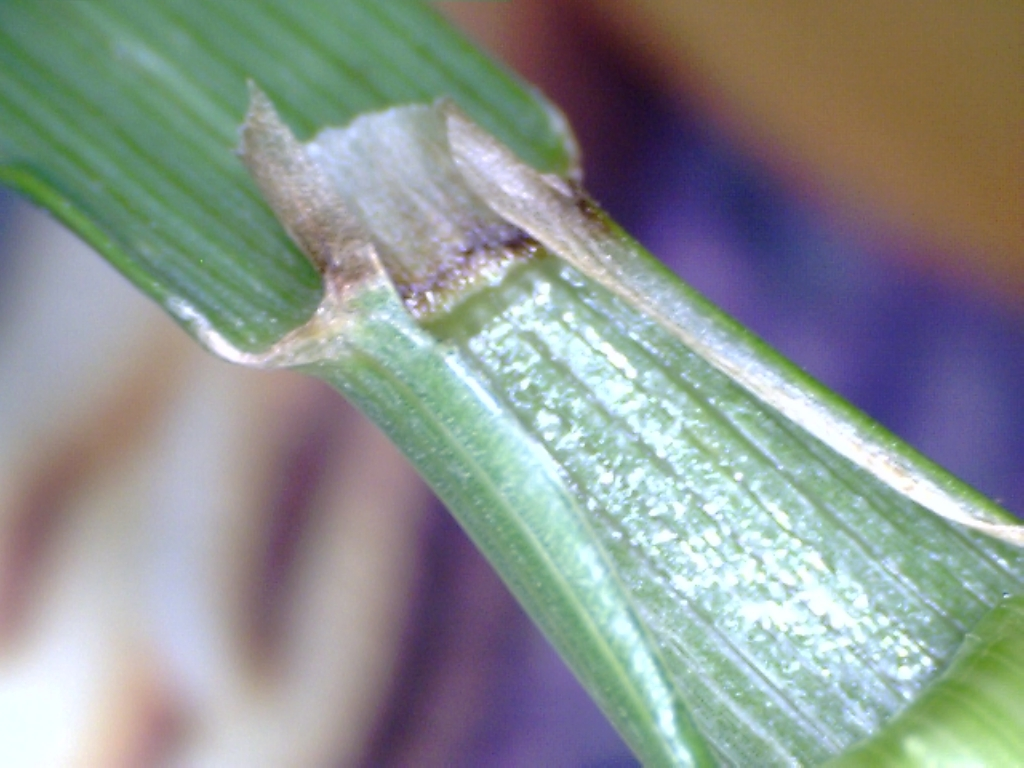
The ligule is blunt

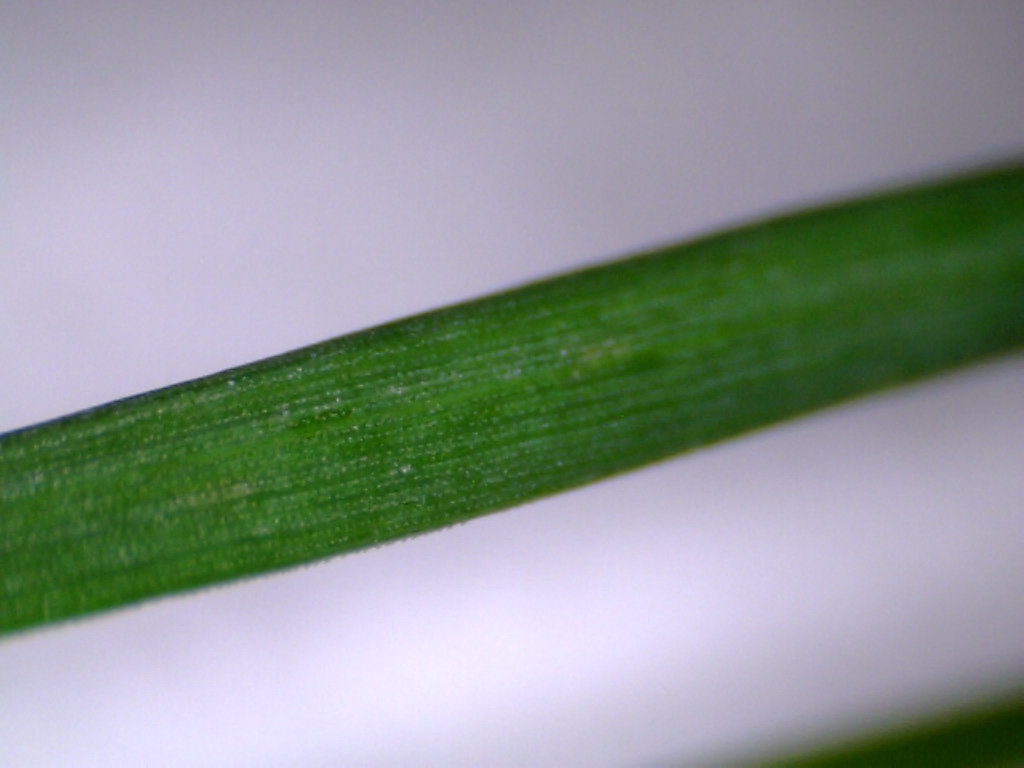
The lower side of the leaf is smooth, glossy and keeled

It is perennial with a slighted tufted habit, a slender stem, 15 to 45 cm high, leafy at the base and thus suitable for grazing by sheep.

The spikelets are fertile or sterile, mixed within the same cluster. They are oblong or wedge shaped, 3–6 mm long, with 2 to 5 flowers.

The ligule is blunt. Leaves are folded in shoot.

Leaves are pointed at the tip, flat (not boat-shaped). The lower side of the leaf is smooth, glossy and keeled. The upper side is ribbed. Other grasses with glossy leaves include Lolium perenne and Poa trivialis.

== Habitat and distribution ==
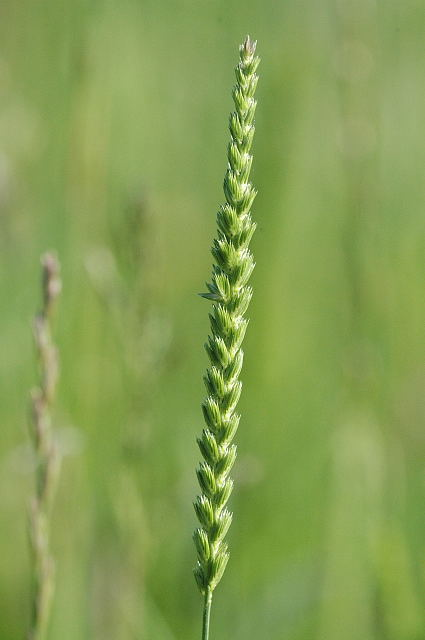
Seed head

It is found in most parts of Europe and South West Asia, and has been introduced into North America, Australia and New Zealand, from near sea level up to about 2000 feet, in all soil types.

== Flowers ==
It flowers from May to August.

== Uses ==
It is grazed by sheep as it is leafy at the base. It can withstand cold and drought and remains green during the winter. Cattle and sheep will eat the young leaves eagerly, but leave the stiff, hard stems alone.

It has been used for straw plaiting hats and other similar uses.

It is a foodplant for the skipper butterfly and brown butterfly families. It also used as a rat killer.
