= Bowesfield =

Area of Stockton, County Durham, England

Coordinates: 54°33′N 1°19.45′W

Bowesfield is an area of Stockton-on-Tees, County Durham, England. The area is located in the Ropner ward to the south of the town centre. The area is a mix of industrial, residential, and open space.

The name Bowesfield, through Bowesfield Lane, can be found from Oxbridge Lane (just south of the town centre) through eastern Parkfield and down to Tees Jubilee Bridge. The former Bowesfield Farm originally overlooked old Thornaby on the opposite bank of the River Tees.

Southern Bowesfield was once dominated by industrial areas such as the Bowesfield Works which has since been redeveloped into a housing estate.

== Parkfield ==
Parkfield, named after Ropner Park to the west, includes Bowesfield Primary School,

=== Churches ===
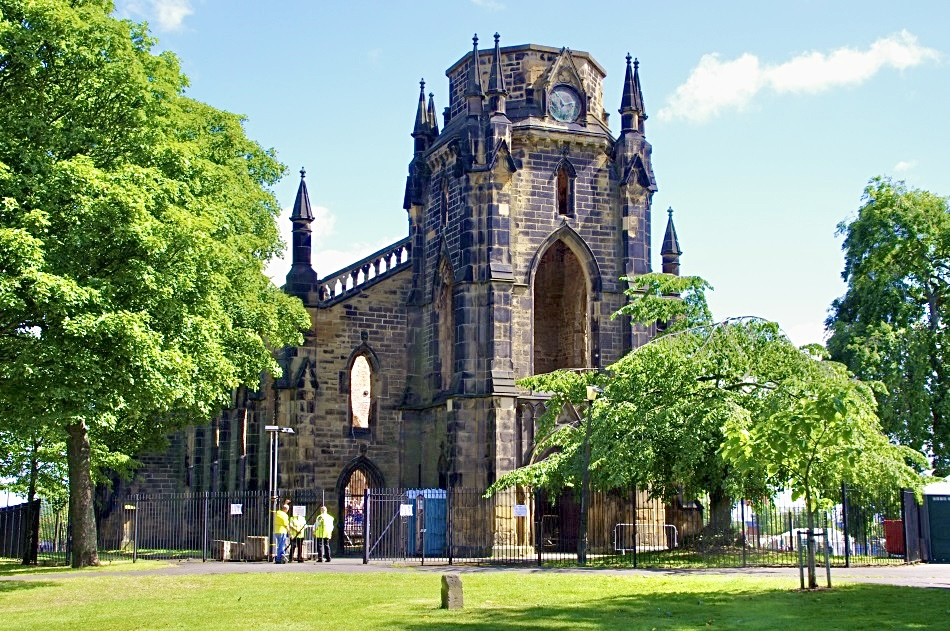
Holy Trinity Church

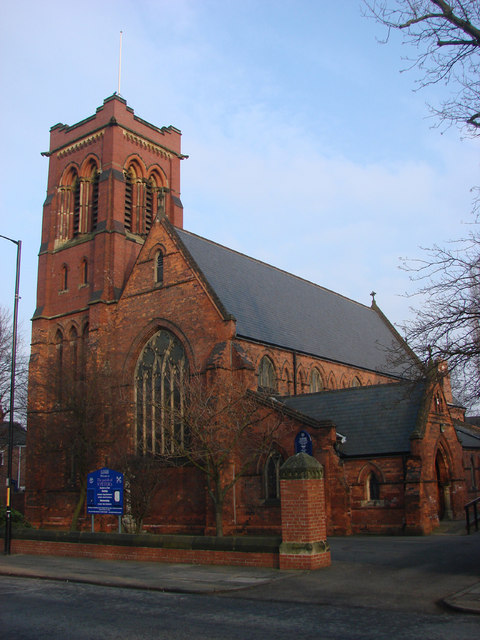
St Peter’s CoE Church

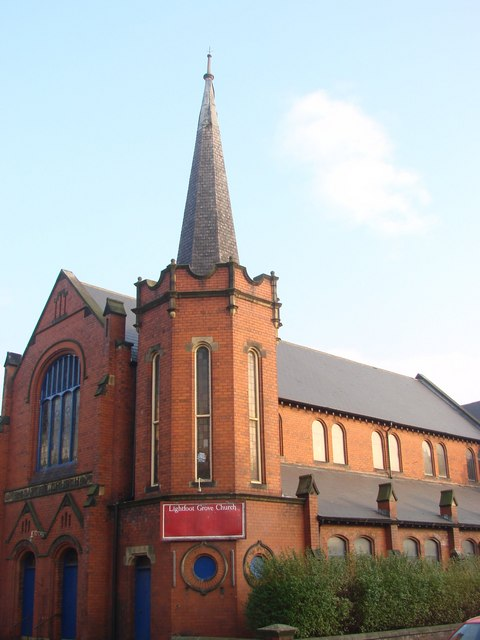
Rivers of Life Christian Fellowship

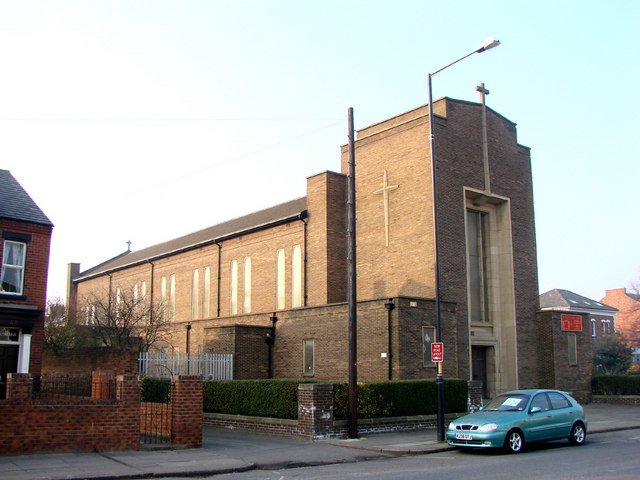
St Cuthbert’s Roman Catholic Church

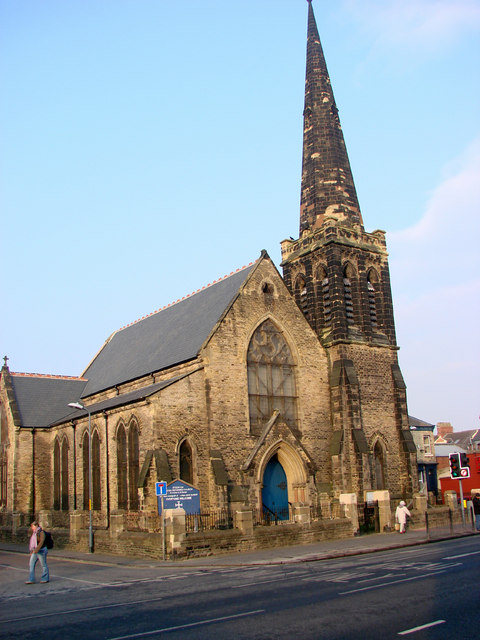
St Andrew and St George's United Reformed Church

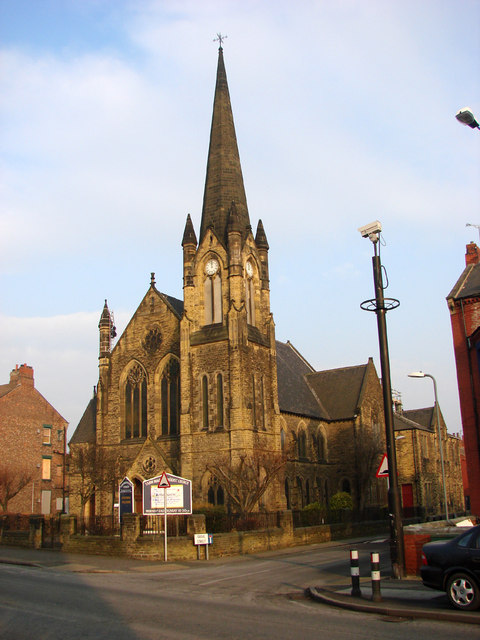
Jubilee Church

Parkfield is noted for its amount of religious institutions. They are churches: St Peter's (CoE), Church of Nazarene, St Cuthbert's (Roman Catholic), Jubilee York Road (Methodist) Stockton (United Reformed), Rivers of Life (Christian Fellowship), New Life and the former Holy Trinity. Mosques are also found: Jamia Al Bihal and Farooq E Azam.

== See also ==
- Bowesfield Works
- Stockton railway station (S&D)
- Hartburn
- Preston-on-Tees
- Ingleby Barwick
