= Stockton Parish Church =

Church building in Stockton-on-Tees, England

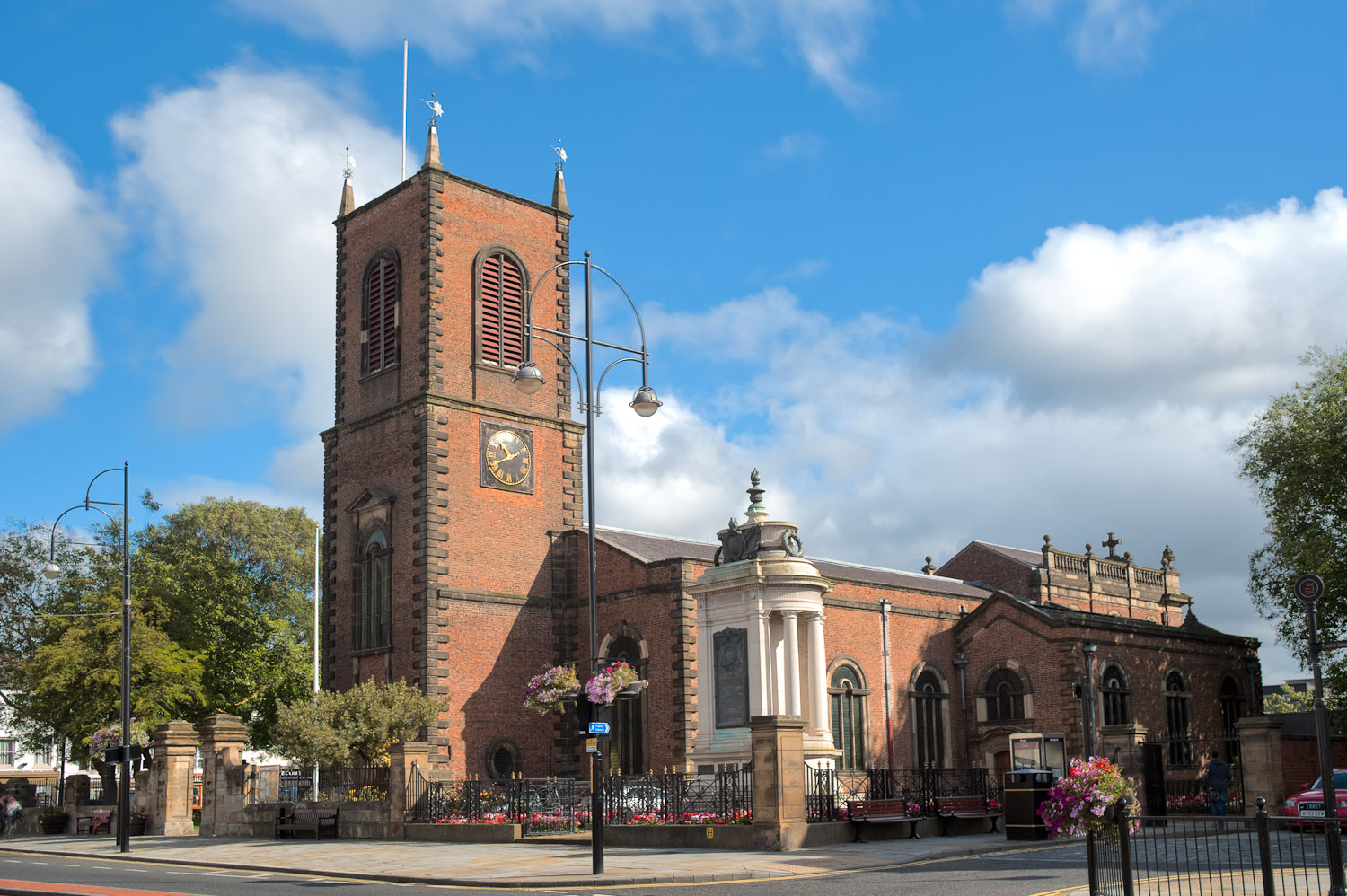
- From the High Street, with the 1923 war memorial
- Stockton Parish Church
- 54°34′00″N 1°18′44″W
- OS grid reference: NZ 44572 19251
- Location: High Street, Stockton-on-Tees, County Durham, TS18 1SP
- Country: England
- Denomination: Church of England
- Churchmanship: Charismatic Evangelical
- Website: www.stocktonparishchurch.org.uk

History
- Status: Active
- Founded: 1235
- Dedication: St Thomas of Canterbury

Architecture
- Functional status: Parish church
- Heritage designation: Grade I
- Architect: Christopher Wren (reputedly)
- Groundbreaking: 1710
- Completed: 1712

Administration
- Diocese: Diocese of Durham
- Archdeaconry: Archdeaconry of Auckland
- Deanery: Stockton
- Parish: Stockton Parish Church

Clergy
- Vicar: Mark Miller

Stockton Parish Church is a Church of England parish church located on the High Street in Stockton-on-Tees, County Durham. The church is a Grade I listed building.

== History ==
=== Chapel-of-ease ===
The first church on the site was a chapel-of-ease in the parish of St Mary's Church, Norton, dedicated to St Thomas of Canterbury and constructed around 1237 for the benefit of the growing settlement of Stockton, and located to the South of the current church. Agreement was made during the reign of Bishop Richard Poore between the parishioners of Stockton, Preston-on-Tees and Hartburn and the vicar of Norton to provide a chaplain and allow baptisms and burials at the chapel.

=== Construction ===
In 1663, Revd Thomas Rudd was given responsibility for the chapel, which in 1705 was declared to be "ruinous and too little", given the growth in the settlement of Stockton. The foundation stone for the new church was laid on 5 June 1710, and it opened on 20 March 1712, and was consecrated by Lord Crew on August 21.

On completion of the parish church, an act of parliament was passed (12 Anne, 1713), entitled "An act for making the chapelry of Stockton in the county of Durham, a distinct parish", and the new church became Stockton Parish Church.

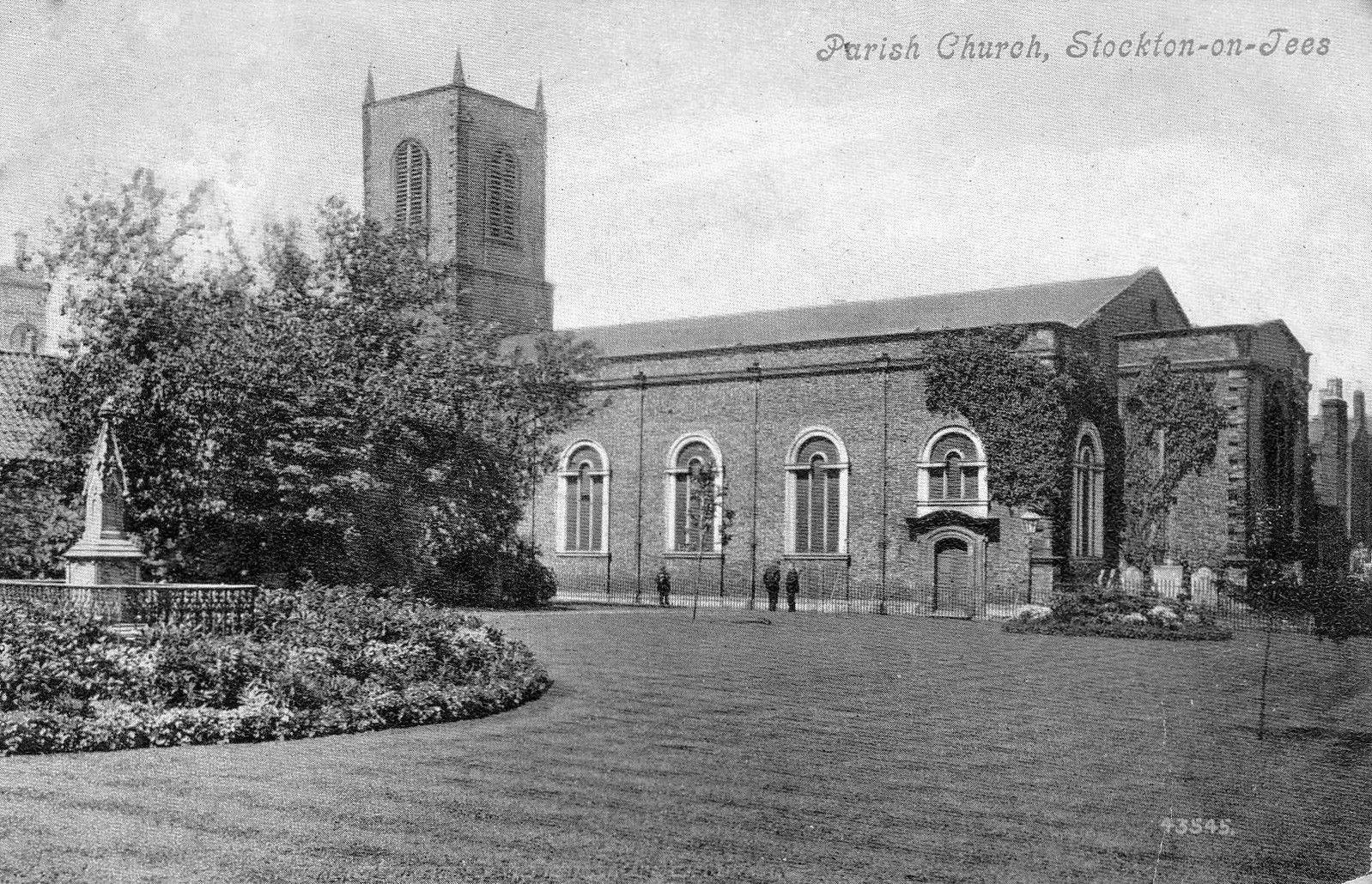
The church before replacement of the chancel in 1906

=== Renovations and additions ===
A clock and chimes was added in 1736, an organ in 1759, and North gallery in 1748.

The church was restored in 1893, then in 1906 it was reseated, and a chancel added by R J Johnson. This is executed in a "Wrenaissance" style, and is taller than the nave.

A war memorial, designed by H V Lancaster in Portland stone, was constructed in front of the church in 1923. In 1925, a side chapel and choir vestry were added by W D Caröe.

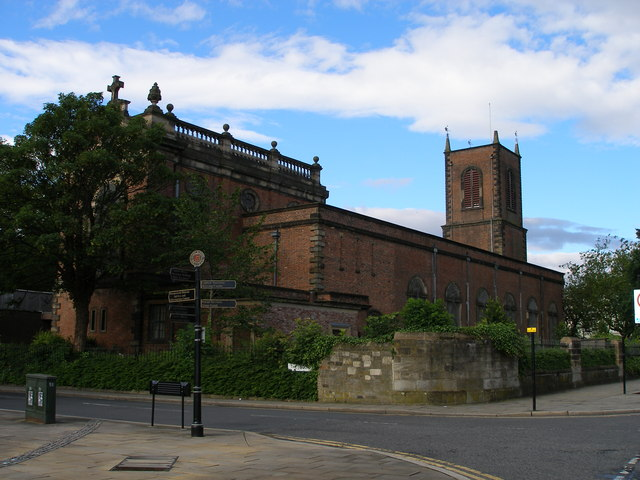
From Church St., showing the 1906 chancel, taller than the nave

=== Recent history ===
From 1995 until 2002, the church was used for graduations from Durham University's Queen's Campus.

In the early 21st century, the church had suffered a decline in numbers and required substantial repairs, and was threatened with closure. Numbers grew after the appointment of Revd Alan Farish as vicar in 2007, and funds were obtained from English Heritage and other sources to restore the building. It has a Charismatic Evangelical churchmanship.
