= Stockton-on-Tees =

Town in County Durham, England

Stockton-on-Tees: Stockton
- Town
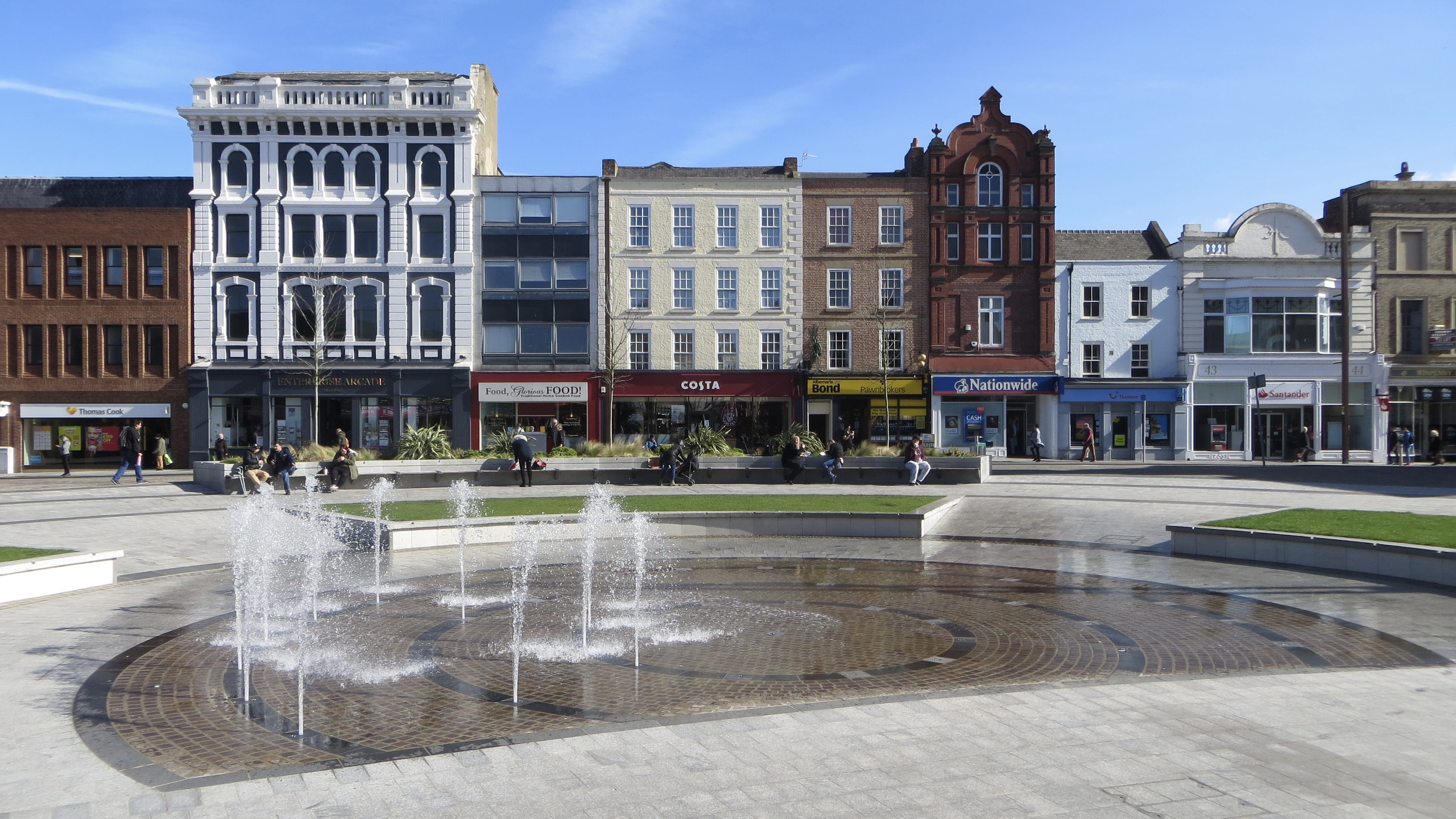
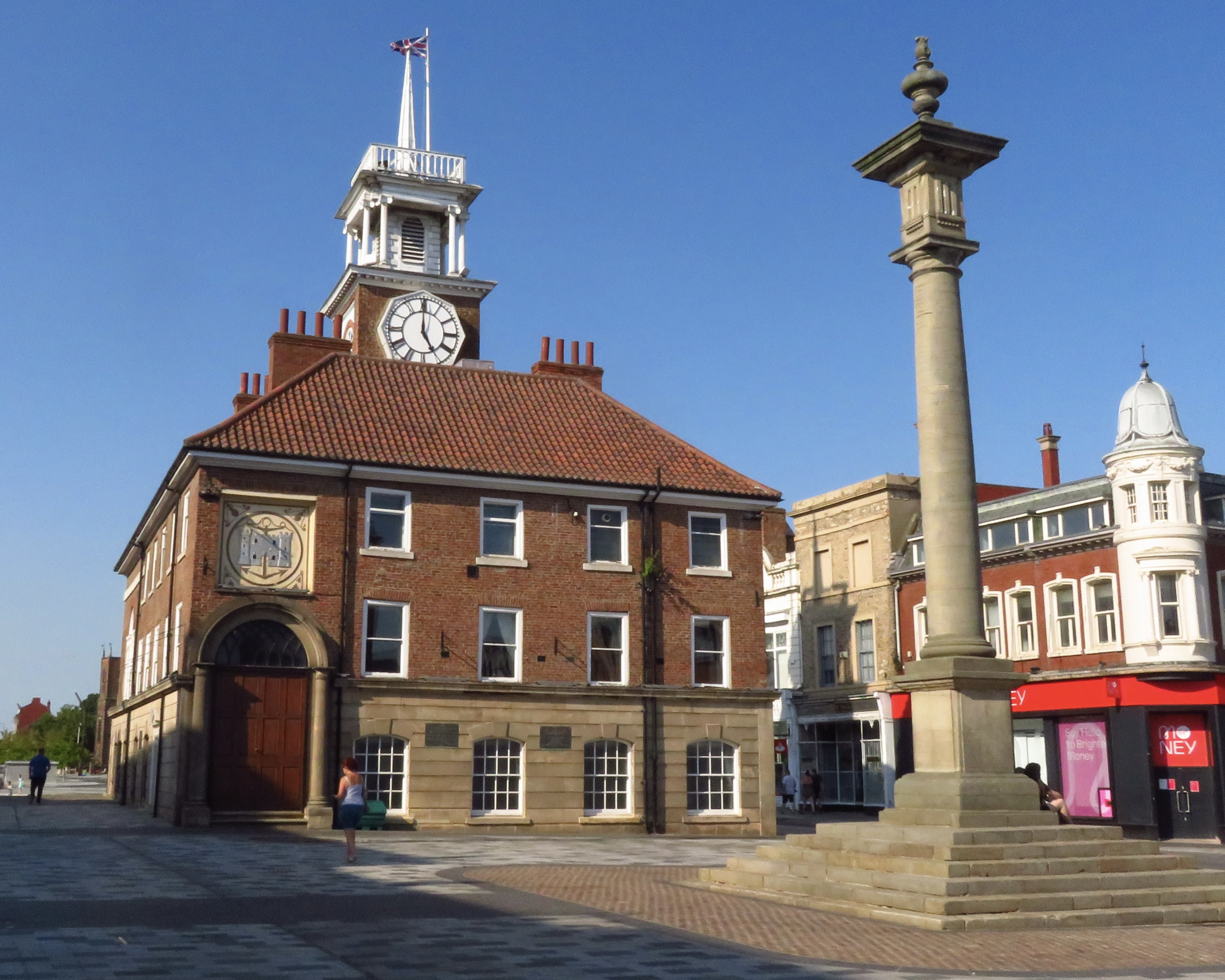
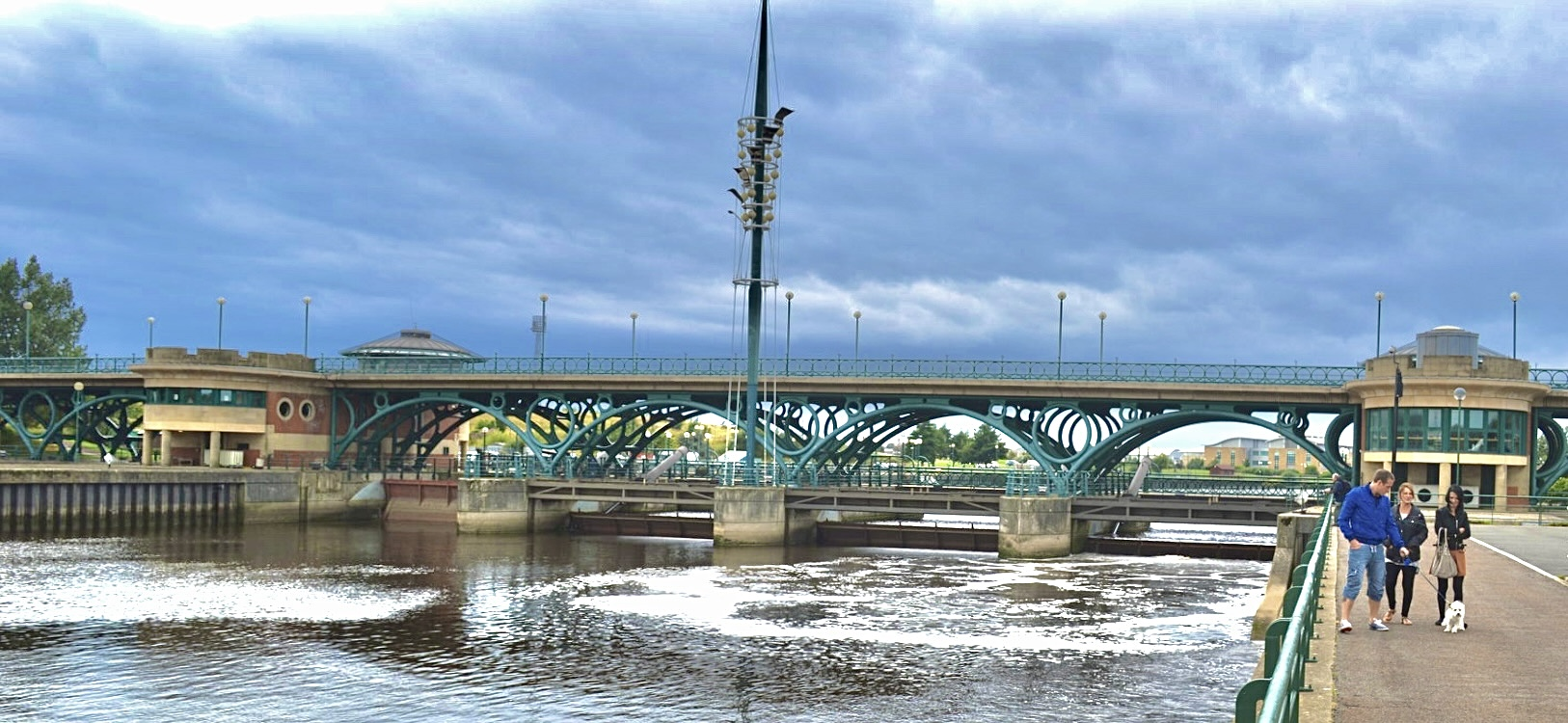
- Fountains Square Town Hall Tees Barrage

- Location within County Durham
- Population: 84,815
- OS grid reference: NZ440200
  - London: 217 mi (349 km)
- Unitary authority: Stockton-on-Tees
- Ceremonial county: County Durham
- Region: North East
- Country: England
- Sovereign state: United Kingdom
- Areas of the town: List: Bishopsgarth; Bowesfield; Fairfield; Elm Tree Farm; Hardwick; Hartburn; Newtown; Roseworth; Oxbridge; Portrack
- Post town: STOCKTON-ON-TEES
- Postcode district: TS16–TS21
- Dialling code: 01642
- Police: Cleveland
- Fire: Cleveland
- Ambulance: North East
- UK Parliament: Stockton North; Stockton West

Stockton-on-Tees is a market town in County Durham, England, with a population of 84,815 at the 2021 census. It gives its name to and is the largest settlement in the wider Borough of Stockton-on-Tees. It is part of Teesside and the Tees Valley, on the northern bank of the River Tees.

The River Tees was straightened in the early 19th century, so that larger ships could access the town. The ports have since relocated closer to the North Sea, and ships are no longer able to sail from the sea to the town. This is due to the building of the Tees Barrage, which was installed to manage tidal flooding. The Stockton and Darlington Railway served the port during the early part of the Industrial Revolution. The railway was also the world's first permanent steam-powered passenger railway.

== History ==
=== Etymology ===
Stockton is an Anglo-Saxon place name with the common ending ton, meaning farm, or homestead. Stock is possibly derived from the Anglo-Saxon Stocc, meaning log, tree trunk, or wooden post. Stockton could therefore mean a farm built of logs. This is disputed because when Stocc forms the first part of a place name, it usually indicates a derivation from the similar word Stoc, meaning cell, monastery, or place. Stoc in place name such as Stoke or Stow usually indicates farms which belonged to a manor or religious house. It is possible the name is an indication that Stockton was an outpost of Durham or Norton which were both important Anglo-Saxon centres.

=== Prehistory ===
Stockton is reportedly the home of the fossilised remains of the most northerly hippopotamus ever discovered. In 1958, an excavation four miles (6 km) north-west of the town uncovered a 125,000-year-old hippo's molar tooth. However, no one knows exactly where the tooth was discovered, who discovered it, or why the dig took place. The tooth was sent to the borough's librarian and curator, G. F. Leighton, who then sent it to the Natural History Museum in London. Since then, the tooth has been missing despite efforts to locate it. The tooth dates to the Last Interglacial (130-115,000 years ago), when hippopotamuses were widespread across Great Britain.

=== Market and castle ===
Stockton began as an Anglo-Saxon settlement on high ground close to the northern bank of the River Tees.

Stockton was described as a manor by 1138, and was purchased by Bishop Pudsey of Durham in 1189. During the 13th century, the bishop changed the village of Stockton into a borough; the exact date the borough was founded is unknown, but it was being described as a borough by 1283. When the bishop freed Stockton's serfs, craftsmen moved to the new town. The bishop had a residence in Stockton Castle, which was a fortified manor house, the first recorded reference to which was in 1376.

Stockton's market traces its history to 1310, when Bishop Bek of Durham granted a market charter "to our town of Stockton a market upon every Wednesday for ever". The town grew into a small but busy port, exporting wool and importing wine, which was in demand by the upper class. However, even by the standards of the time, medieval Stockton-on-Tees was a small town, with a population of only approximately 1,000; the town did not grow for centuries.

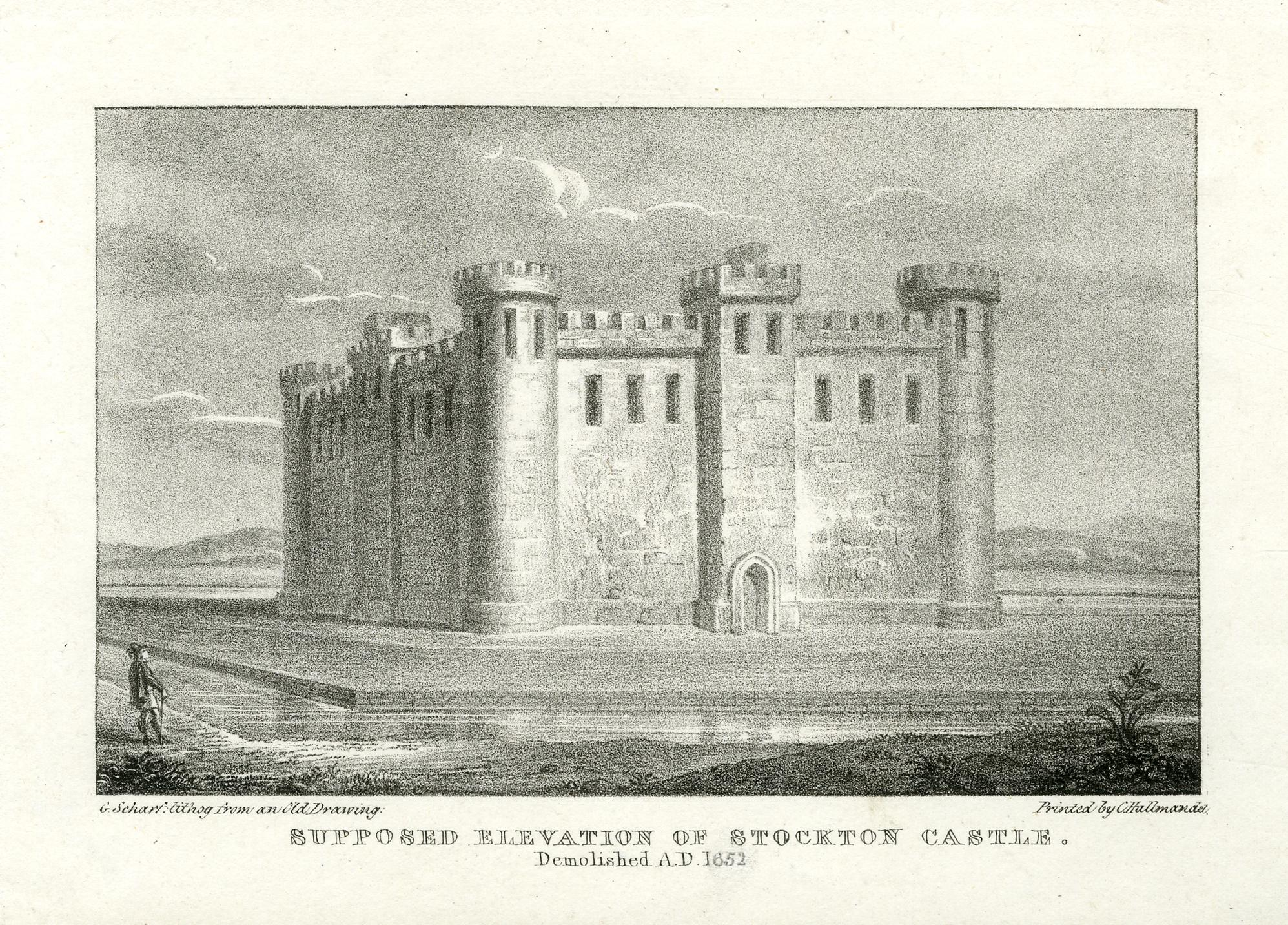
Depiction of Stockton Castle, since demolished

The Scots captured Stockton Castle in 1644, and occupied it until 1646. The castle was destroyed at the order of Oliver Cromwell at the end of the Civil War. A shopping centre, the Castlegate Centre, now occupies the castle area, and this was demolished in 2022 to make way for a new waterfront park opening up the high street to the river tees. No known accurate depictions of the castle exist.

The Town House (now called the Town Hall) was built in 1735, and Stockton's first theatre opened in 1766. In 1771, a five-arch stone bridge was built, replacing the nearby Bishop's Ferry. Until the opening of the Middlesbrough Transporter Bridge in 1911, this was the Tees's most downstream bridging point. From the end of the 18th century, the Industrial Revolution transformed Stockton from a small and quiet market town into a flourishing centre of heavy industry.

In 1833, the then Bishop of Durham, William Van Mildert (1765–1836) gifted five acres and the land of an existing burial site called "The Monument" (originally a mass grave from a prior cholera outbreak) to the town of Stockton. Upon this land, the process of building of and designing the gothic style Holy Trinity Church began, using funds originally allocated for church building in the Church Building Act 1818. It was designed by John and Benjamin Green, and construction began in 1834. It was consecrated as an Anglican church on 22 December 1835.

=== Locomotion ===
Shipbuilding, which had started in the 15th century, prospered in the town through the 17th and 18th centuries, with small industries also developing. These included brick, sail, and rope making, the latter now reflected in road names such as Ropery Street in the town centre. Stockton became the major port for County Durham, the North Riding of Yorkshire, and Westmorland during this period, exporting mainly rope, agricultural produce and lead from the Yorkshire Dales. Iron making and engineering entered the local economy in the 18th century. The population at the time of the 1841 census was 9,825 inhabitants.

The town grew rapidly as the Industrial Revolution started, with the population growing from 10,000, in 1851, to over 50,000, in 1901, as workers moved in. The discovery of iron ore in the Eston Hills resulted in blast furnaces lining the River Tees from Stockton to the river's mouth. In 1820, an Act set up the Commissioners, a body with responsibility for lighting and cleaning the streets, and from 1822, Stockton-on-Tees was lit by gas.

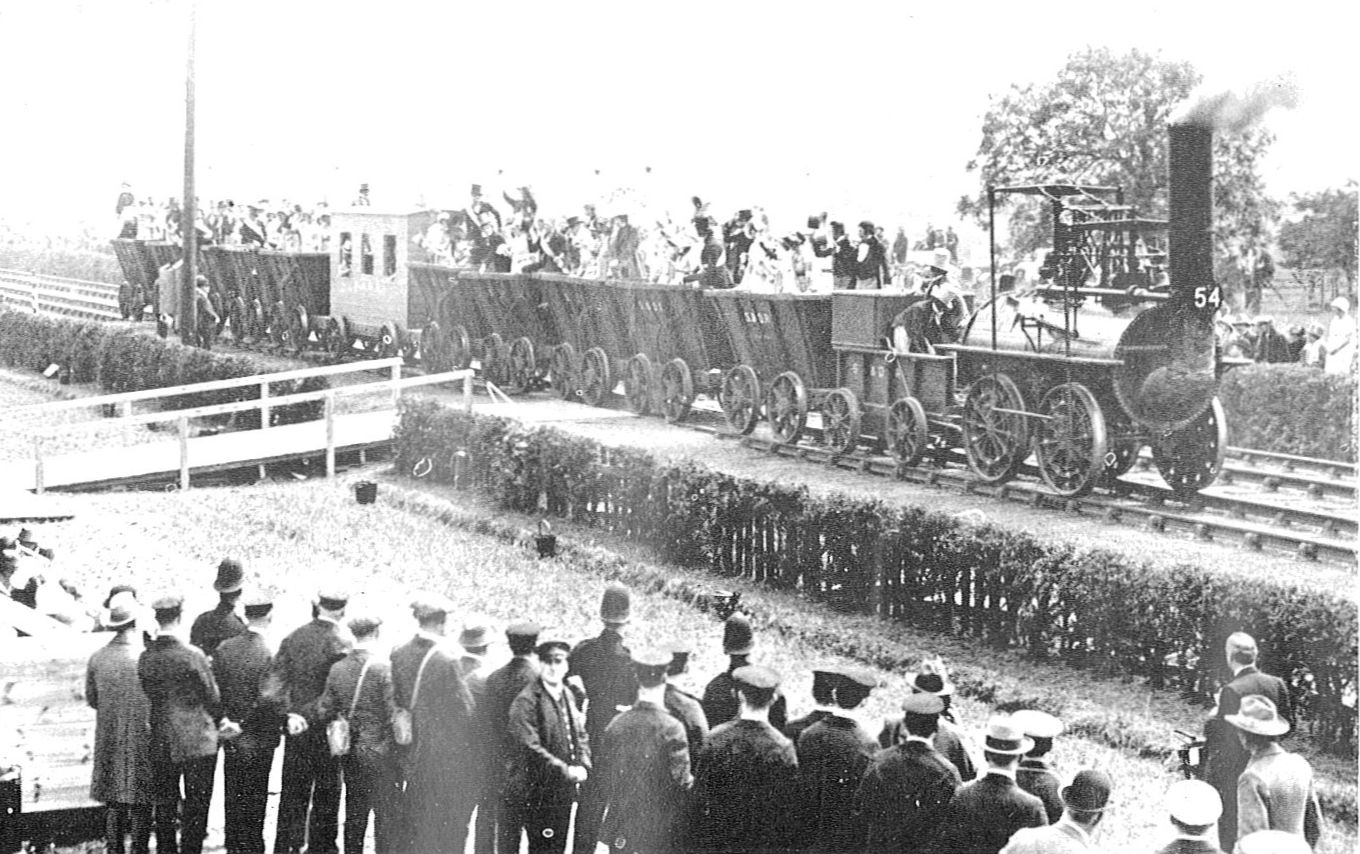
Locomotion No 1 on the Stockton & Darlington Railway at the 1925 100th anniversary cavalcade

In 1822, Stockton witnessed an event which changed the face of the world forever, and which heralded the dawn of a new era in trade, industry and travel. The first rail of George Stephenson's Stockton and Darlington Railway was laid near St. John's crossing on Bridge Road. Hauled by Locomotion No 1, Stephenson himself manned the engine on its first journey on 27 September 1825. Fellow engineer and friend Timothy Hackworth acted as guard. This was the world's first passenger railway, connecting Stockton with Darlington. The opening of the railway greatly boosted Stockton's economy, making it easier to bring coal to the factories.

=== The friction match ===
Stockton witnessed another development in 1827. Local chemist, John Walker, invented the friction match, in his shop, at 59, High Street. The first sale of these matches was recorded in his sales-book on 7 April 1827, to a Mr. Hixon, a solicitor in the town. Since he did not obtain a patent, Walker received neither fame nor wealth for his invention, but he was able to retire some years before his death. He died in 1859 at the age of 78, and is buried in the parish churchyard in Norton village.

To cater to the increased population, a hospital opened in Stockton in 1862, and a public library opened in 1877. Public transport also became important. Steam trams began running in the streets in 1881, and these were replaced by electric trams in 1897.

=== 1930s ===
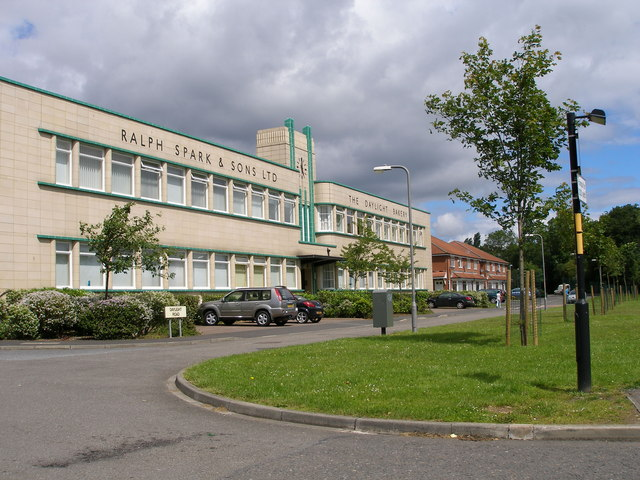
Spark's Daylight Bakery, surviving Art Deco style build from 1938

Stockton was still dominated by the engineering industry in the 1930s, and there was also a chemicals industry in the town. Buses replaced the trams in 1931. Public housing also became necessary, and in the 1930s, slums were cleared, and the first council houses were built.

On 10 September 1933, the Battle of Stockton took place, in which between 200 and 300 supporters of the British Union of Fascists were taken to Stockton to hold a rally, but they were driven out of town by up to 2,000 anti-fascist demonstrators.

=== Services and riots ===
In the late 20th century, manufacturing severely declined, and service industries became the town's primary employers.

The Ragworth district near the town centre was the scene of rioting, in July 1992, when local youths threw stones at buildings, set cars alight, and threw missiles at police and fire crews. The area later saw a £12 million regeneration which involved mass demolition and refurbishment of existing properties, and construction of new housing and community facilities.

== Geography ==
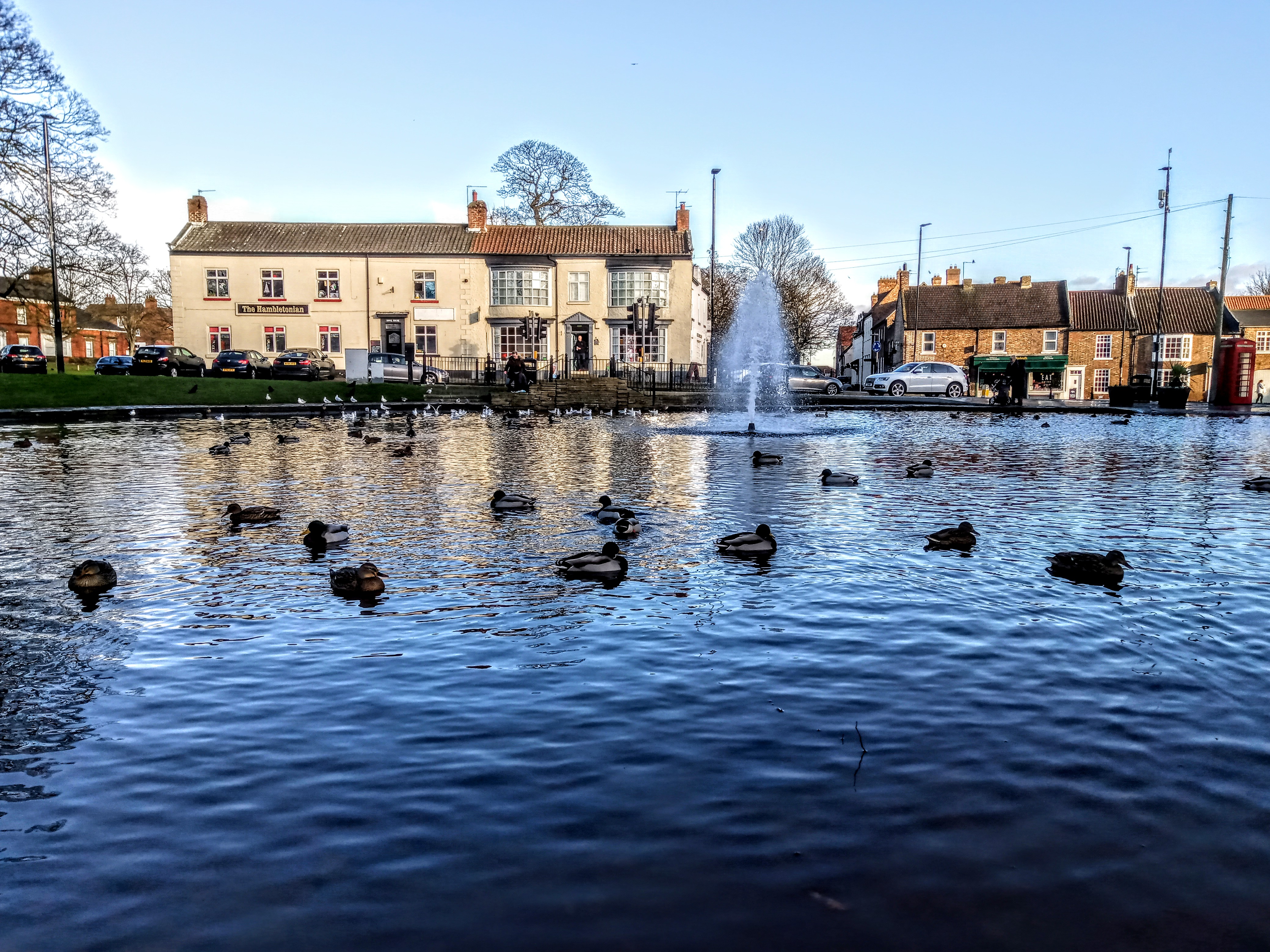
Fountain on Norton's village green

Stockton lies on the north bank of the River Tees. The town's northern and western extremities are on slightly higher ground than the town centre, which is directly on the Tees. Stockton experiences occasional earth tremors. For example, it was the epicentre of a tremor measuring 2.8 on the Richter scale on 23 January 2020. The town has many areas outside of the town centre; Fairfield, Portrack, Hardwick, Hartburn, Elm Tree Farm, Norton, Roseworth, Newtown, Bishopsgarth and Oxbridge. Norton is the second largest centre in the town.

=== Distance to other places ===
Place	Distance	Direction	Relation
London	217 miles (349 km)	South	Capital city of the UK
Durham	18 miles (29 km)	North	Historic county town and closest city
Darlington	10 miles (16 km)	West	Combined Authority area
Hartlepool	9 miles (14 km)	North east	Combined Authority area
Middlesbrough	3 miles (4.8 km)	East	Combined Authority area

=== Climate ===
Stockton-on-Tees has an oceanic climate typical for the United Kingdom. Being sheltered from prevailing south-westerly winds by the Lake District and Pennines to the west, and the Cleveland Hills to the south, it is in one of the relatively dry parts of the country, receiving on average 596 millimetres (23.5 inches) of rain per year. Temperatures range from mild summer highs in July and August typically around 21 °C (70 °F), to winter lows in December and January falling to around 1 °C (34 °F).

Seasonal variations are small and both the mild summers and cool winters are far removed from the average climates of the latitude (54.5°N). This is mainly due to the British Isles being a relatively small land mass surrounded by water, the mild south-westerly Gulf Stream air that dominates the British Isles, and the propensity for cloud cover to limit temperature extremes. In nearby Scandinavia, more than ten degrees further north, there are coastal Bothnian climates with warmer summers than Stockton-on-Tees; winters in Stockton-on-Tees can be less cold than those at lower latitudes in mainland Europe.

Climate data for Hartburn Grange (Note: Weather station is located 2.3 miles (3.7 km) from the Stockton-on-Tees town centre.) (1991–2020 normals)
Month	Jan	Feb	Mar	Apr	May	Jun	Jul	Aug	Sep	Oct	Nov	Dec	Year
Record high °C (°F)	13.9 (57.0)	14.6 (58.3)	19.7 (67.5)	21.2 (70.2)	25.2 (77.4)	30.0 (86.0)	29.4 (84.9)	33.9 (93.0)	24.3 (75.7)	24.7 (76.5)	17.0 (62.6)	14.7 (58.5)	33.9 (93.0)
Mean daily maximum °C (°F)	7.0 (44.6)	7.9 (46.2)	10.0 (50.0)	12.8 (55.0)	15.5 (59.9)	18.2 (64.8)	20.6 (69.1)	20.4 (68.7)	17.7 (63.9)	13.9 (57.0)	9.9 (49.8)	7.3 (45.1)	13.5 (56.3)
Daily mean °C (°F)	4.1 (39.4)	4.6 (40.3)	6.1 (43.0)	8.4 (47.1)	10.8 (51.4)	13.6 (56.5)	15.8 (60.4)	15.7 (60.3)	13.3 (55.9)	10.2 (50.4)	6.7 (44.1)	4.2 (39.6)	9.4 (48.9)
Mean daily minimum °C (°F)	1.1 (34.0)	1.2 (34.2)	2.1 (35.8)	3.9 (39.0)	6.1 (43.0)	8.9 (48.0)	10.9 (51.6)	10.9 (51.6)	8.8 (47.8)	6.5 (43.7)	3.5 (38.3)	1.0 (33.8)	5.4 (41.7)
Record low °C (°F)	−16.2 (2.8)	−16.4 (2.5)	−8.7 (16.3)	−6.1 (21.0)	−3.2 (26.2)	−0.4 (31.3)	2.6 (36.7)	2.1 (35.8)	−1.7 (28.9)	−5.2 (22.6)	−10.4 (13.3)	−17.1 (1.2)	−17.1 (1.2)
Average precipitation mm (inches)	40.2 (1.58)	36.1 (1.42)	34.0 (1.34)	39.2 (1.54)	42.0 (1.65)	55.7 (2.19)	59.1 (2.33)	63.3 (2.49)	52.3 (2.06)	59.3 (2.33)	62.8 (2.47)	52.2 (2.06)	596.2 (23.47)
Average precipitation days (≥ 1.0 mm)	9.9	8.1	8.4	8.2	9.0	8.7	9.1	9.8	8.0	9.8	11.8	10.6	111.5
Mean monthly sunshine hours	56.1	76.2	109.6	138.9	180.7	171.2	174.3	161.4	125.9	91.1	59.5	50.4	1,395.3
Source 1: Met Office (precipitation days 1981–2010)
Source 2: Starlings Roost Weather

=== Town centre ===
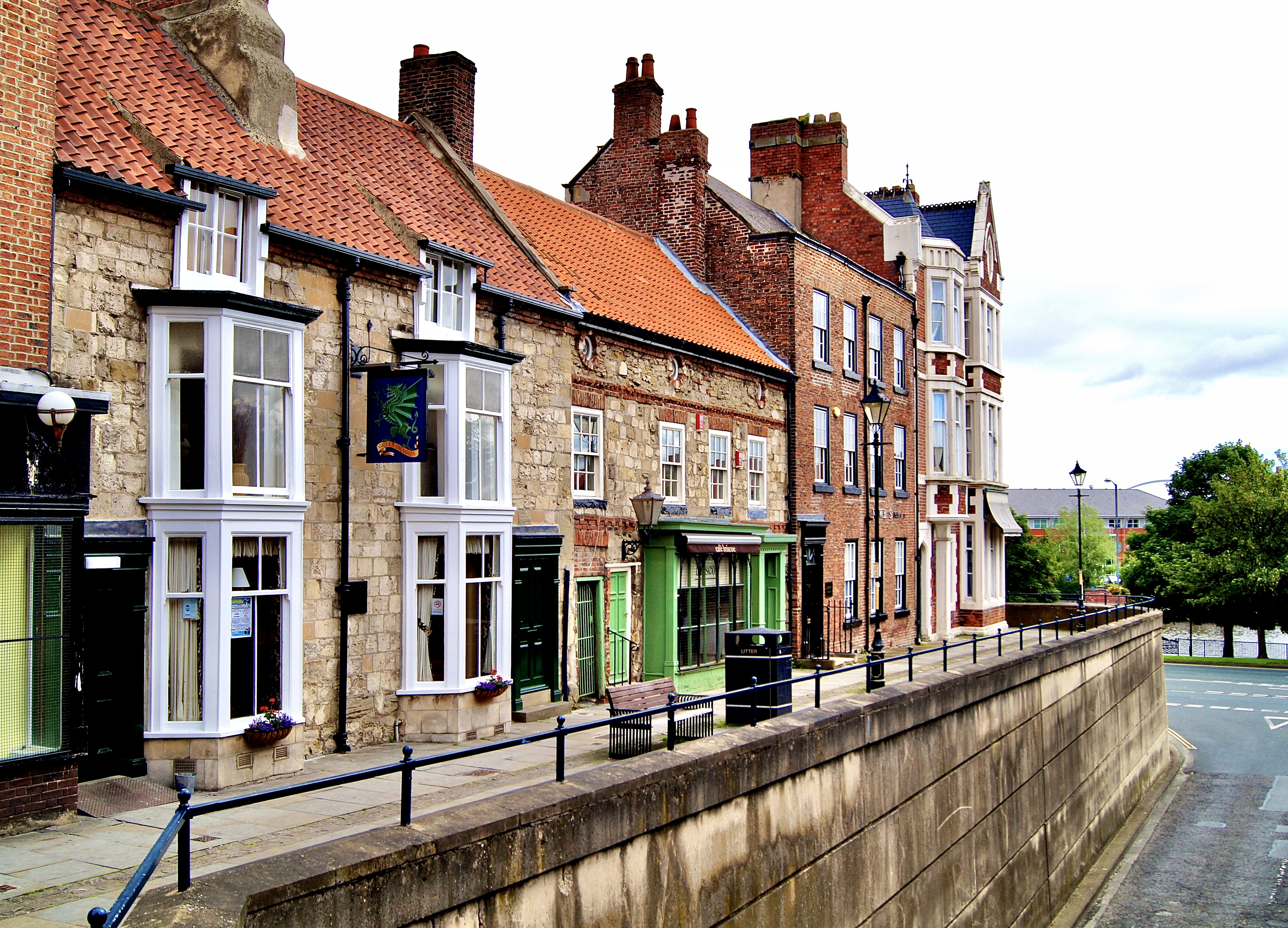
Row of historic buildings in Finkle Street

Stockton town centre is the heart of the borough. The High Street—the widest in the UK—heads north through the town centre from the junction of Bridge Road and Yarm Lane, to Maxwell's Corner, where Norton Road and Bishopton Lane begin. Dovecot Street runs west from the High Street's midway point, and further north, Church Road extends east toward Northshore and the River Tees. At the centre of the High Street stands Stockton-on-Tees Town Hall, dating from 1735, and the Georgian-style Shambles Market Hall. Around the town hall, the largest outdoor market in North East England, which has been in existence since the 1300s, continues to be held every Wednesday and Saturday.

Much of the town centre has a Georgian and late medieval influence, with a number of listed buildings and a variety of architectural types, which help to define the town's identity. The shops predominantly have narrow frontages stretching back to gain floorspace. This burgage plot style is particularly evident around the marketplace and on side streets such as Silver Street, Finkle Street and Ramsgate. There is also the surviving ruins of the gothic style church in Trinity Green, which dates back to 1834.

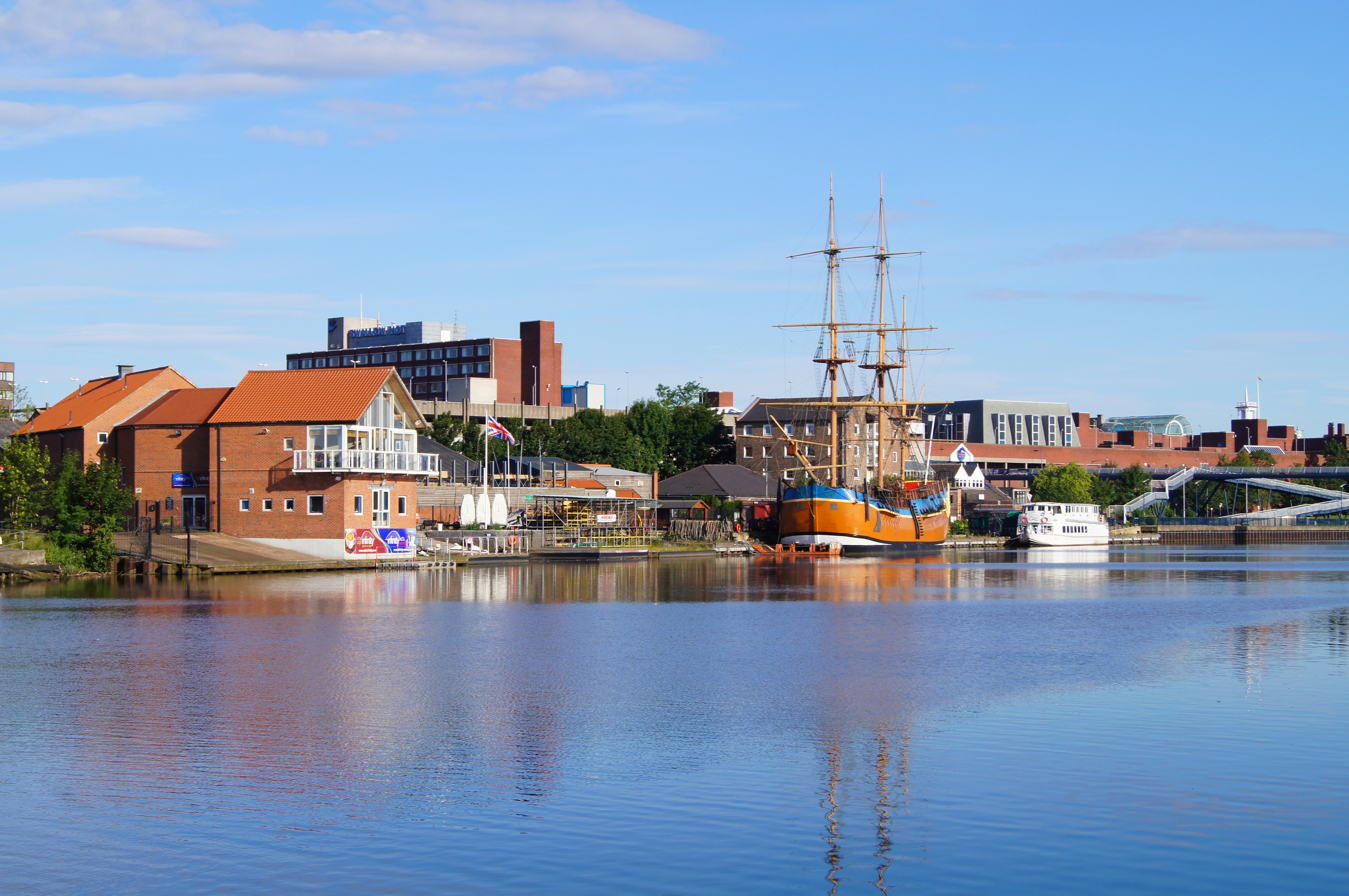
Replica of HMS Endeavour and Teesside Princess at Castlegate Quay

Before 2022, the town centre retail was largely concentrated within two shopping centres, Castlegate and Wellington Square. Wellington Square has open shops on pedestrian-only paths whereas the Castlegate, opened in 1972 and currently undergoing demolition, was a building which incorporated a multi-storey car park and an indoor market. Its façade was a dominant feature along the south east of the High Street, its site bounded by Finkle Street, Bridge Road and Tower Street. The Riverside dual carriageway and the River Tees run almost parallel to the rear of the centre. The Teesquay Millennium Footbridge links the Castlegate Quay on the north side of the river to Teesdale Business Park and Durham University's Queen's Campus on the south side in the ceremonial county of the North Riding of Yorkshire. Situated at the north west end of the town centre is Wellington Square shopping centre, built on the old Wellington Street. Opened in 2001 at a cost of £43 million, it houses 46 shop units.

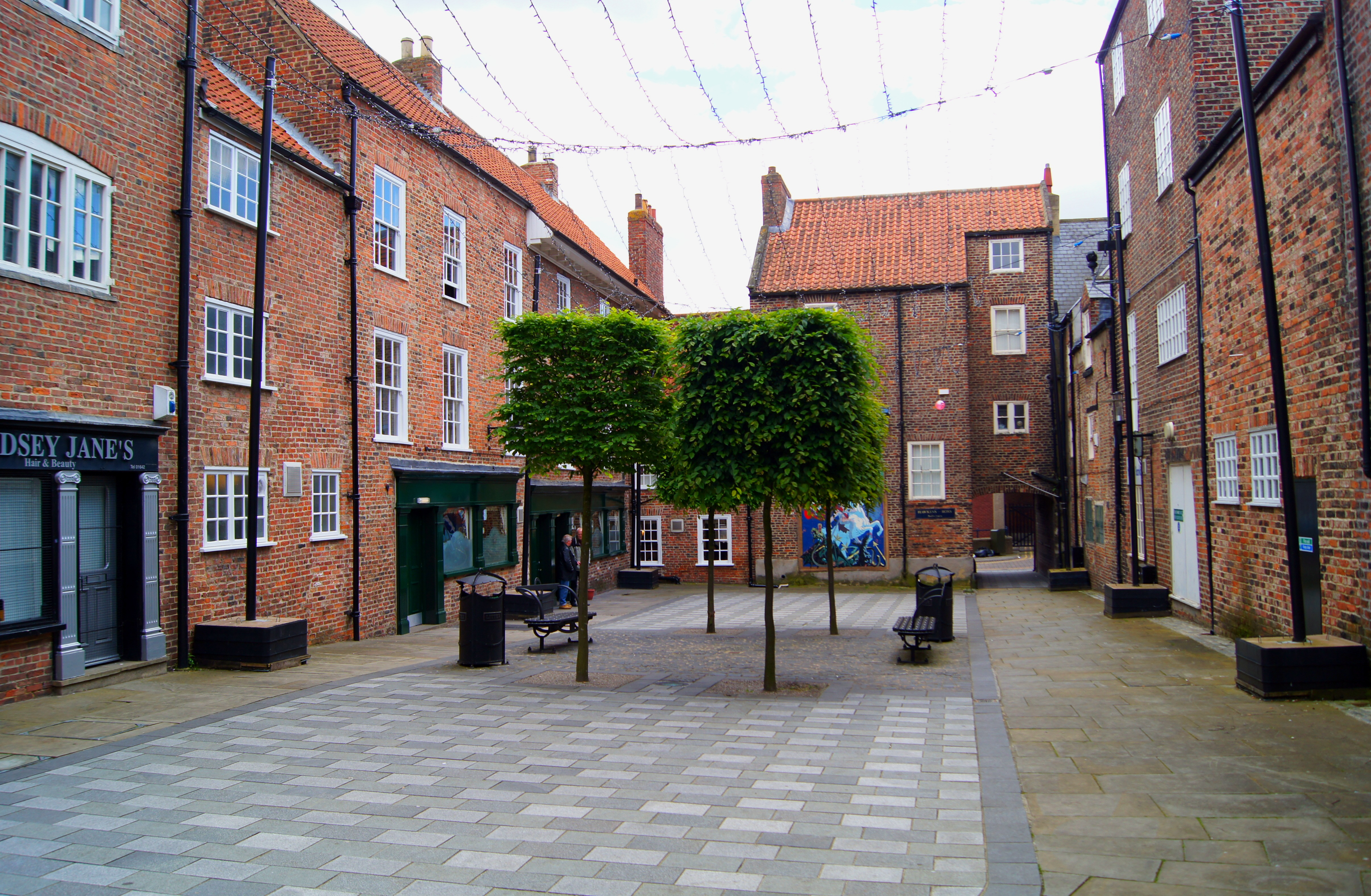
Green Dragon Yard

The town centre has retained a number of original yards such as Wasp Nest Yard, Hambletonian Yard, and Ship Inn Yard. Most notable is Green Dragon Yard, a courtyard of restored historic warehouses within a series of alleyways. Considered the cultural quarter of the town, this houses the Green Dragon public house, the Green Dragon Studios (recording studios) and Britain's oldest surviving Georgian Theatre.

Alongside retail outlets, Stockton town centre also has a variety of services including national banks and building societies, travel agents, a post office, hairdressers, beauticians, cafés, and restaurants. The refurbishment of some period buildings has provided space for small firms including solicitors, recruitment agencies, and accountants.

=== Demolition and construction of the Waterfront ===
In 2019, with the council trying to tackle the centre's empty shops, the council bought both Wellington Square and Castlegate Centre, with Castlegate Centre to be demolished along with the Stockton Swallow Hotel in order to create a new urban park on the old site of the two demolished buildings.

The new urban park proposed called "Waterfront" is to be an urban park with open, flexible spaces for community, and large scale events. The development will also include the narrowing and tunnelling of Riverside Road allowing people to walk straight from the High Street to the River Tees. To be built alongside the Waterfront is a new NHS health hub offering rapid scans, tests and checks, creating 130 roles for the area. This new development will concentrate Stockton's retail area to be within Wellington Square.

The Waterfront started development with the demolition of Castlegate Centre and the Swallow Hotel in September 2022, with all demolition work completed by the end of 2023. Since then the NHS health hub's exterior has been built and can be seen from the Town centre with the rest of the development undergoing construction.

=== Riverside ===
Bridges of Stockton
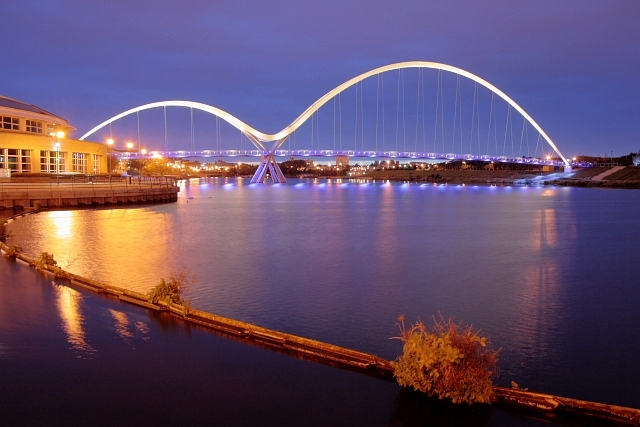
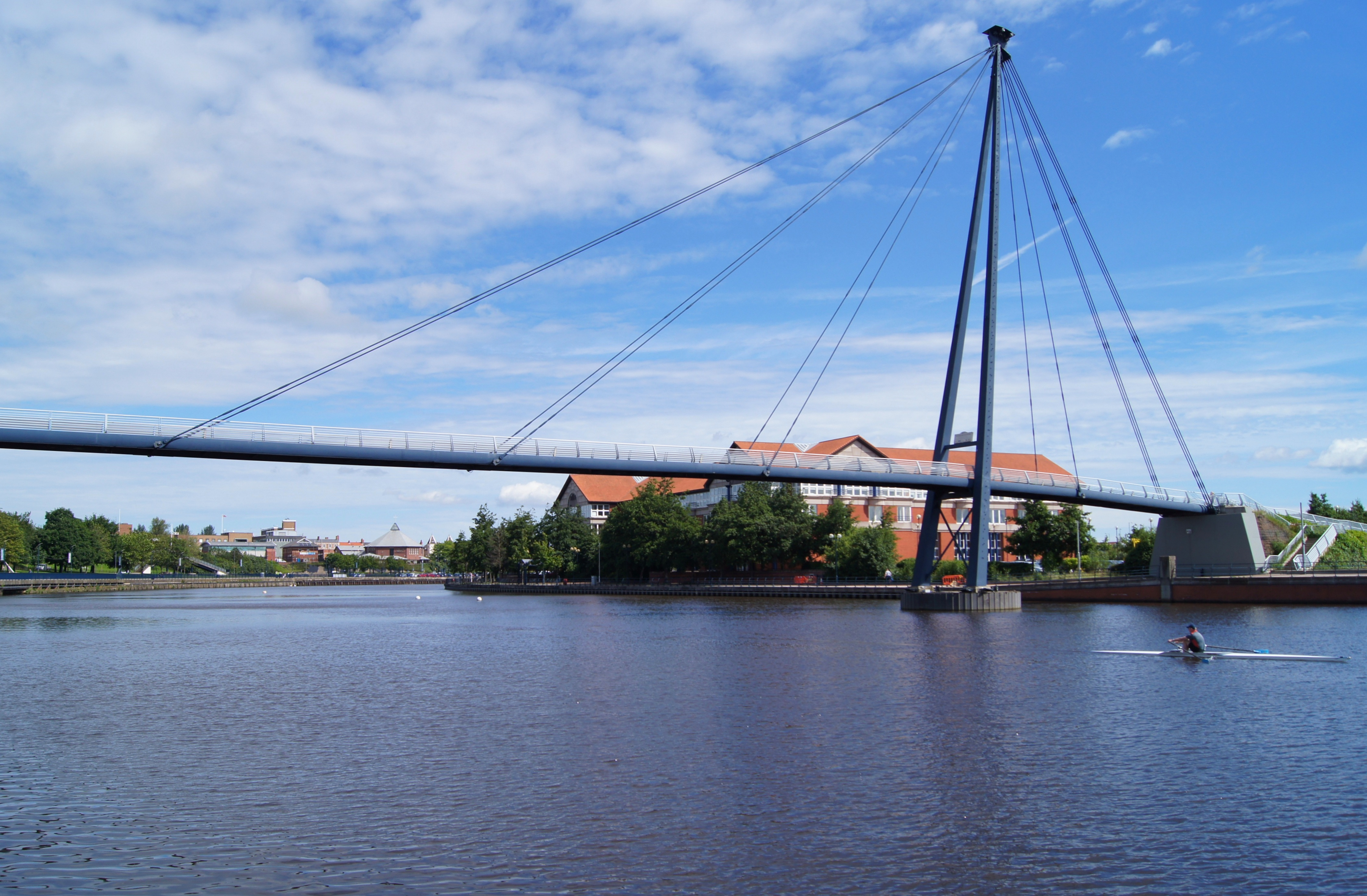
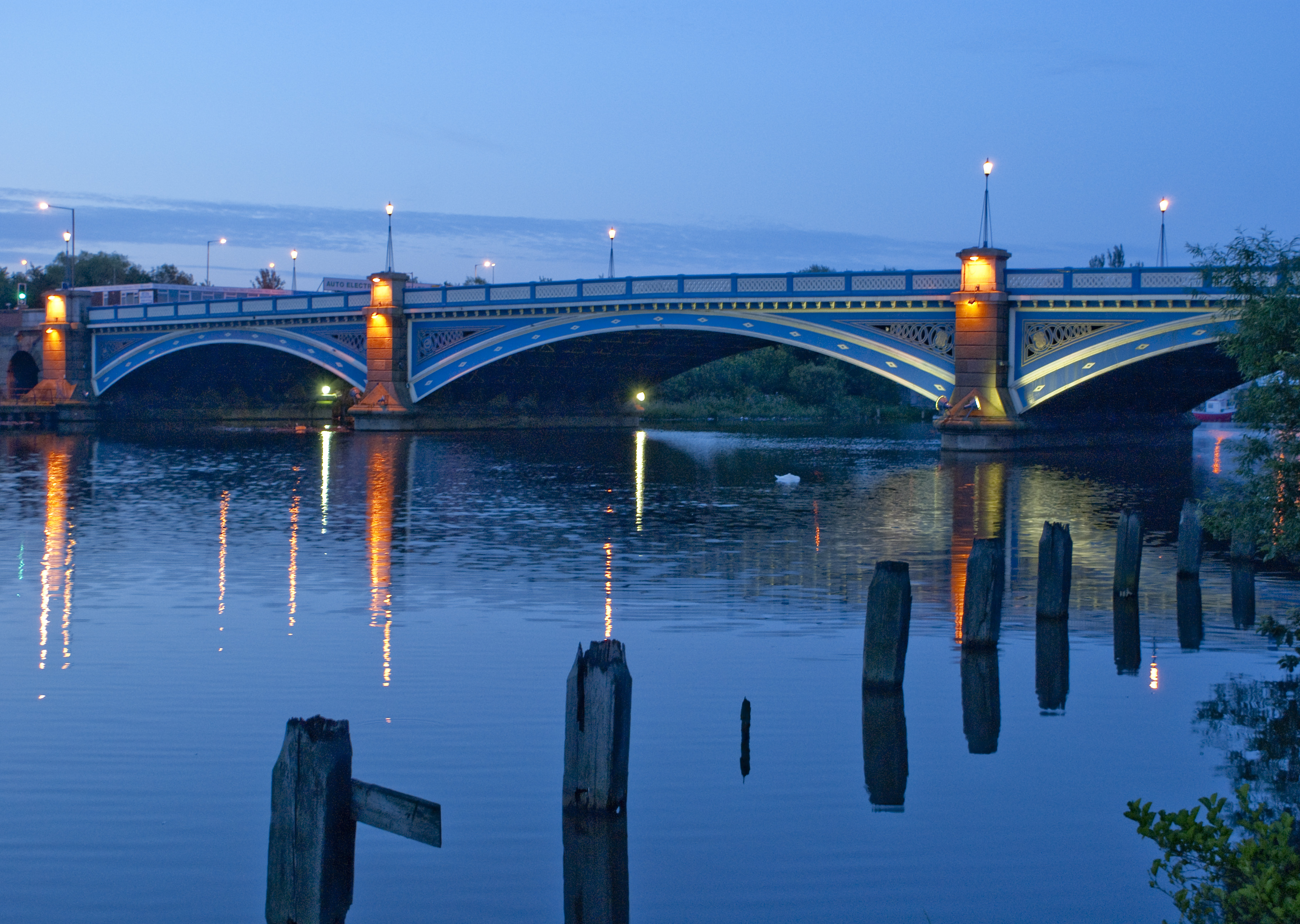
From top: Infinity Bridge (opened in 2009); Teesquay Millennium Footbridge; Victoria Bridge

Since the construction of the Tees Barrage in 1995, the level of the River Tees through the town has permanently been held at high tide, creating a backdrop for riverside events and facilitating watersports activities such as rowing, canoeing, jet skiing, and dragon boat racing. Stockton town centre is elevated above the river, and is separated from the riverside by the A1305 Riverside Road, a dual carriageway which runs parallel to the river from Northshore to Chandlers Wharf.

From the town centre, Bishop Street, Silver Street, Calvert's Lane, and Thistle Green offer views of the river where it meanders around Teesdale Business Park. Durham University Queen's Campus can be seen on the opposite side, alongside the skyline of Middlesbrough in the middle distance and Roseberry Topping in the Cleveland Hills, approximately fifteen miles (24 km) south east.

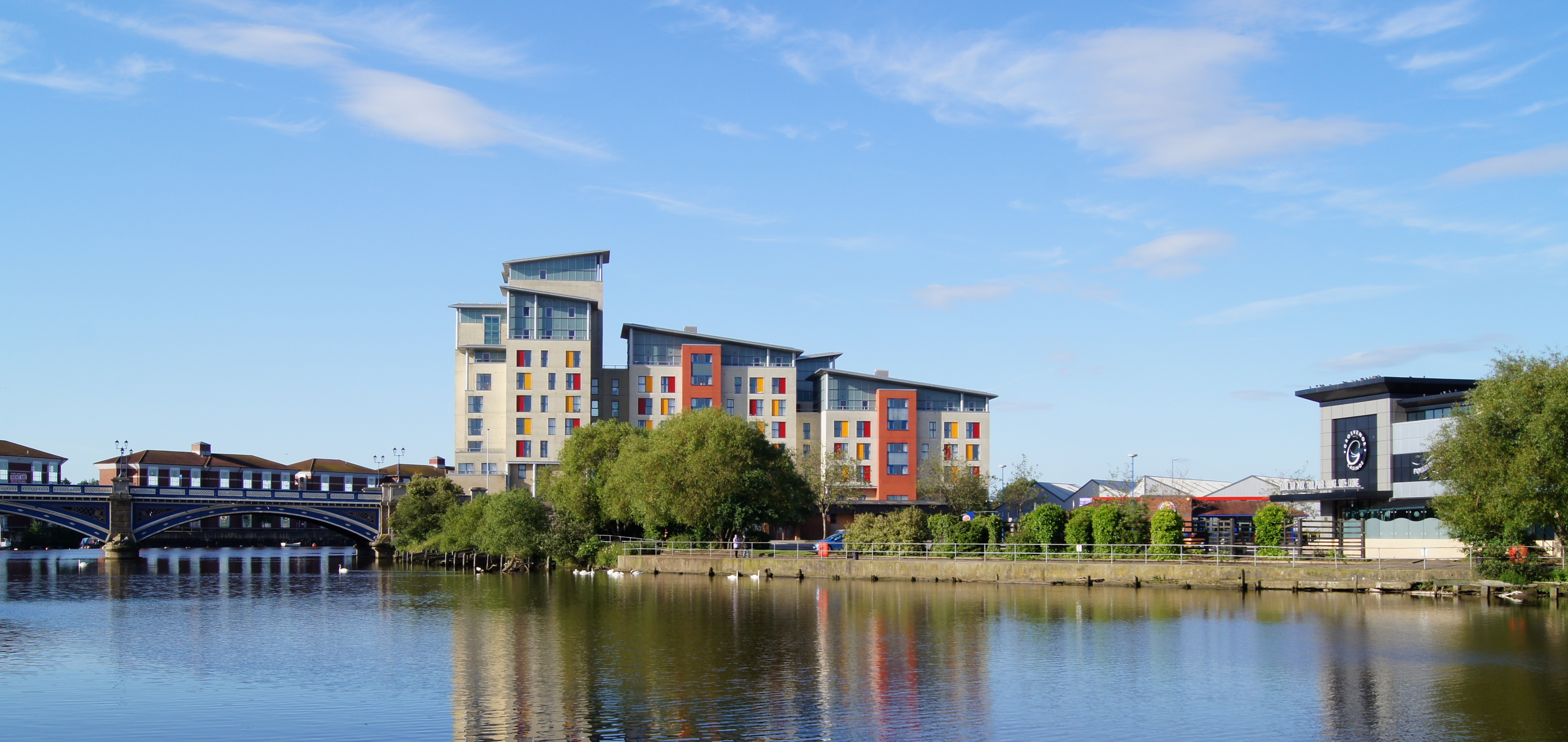
Mezzino student apartments and Chandlers Wharf

Chandlers Wharf is situated on the north side of the river where Bridge Road approaches Victoria Bridge. The area is characterised by a mixture of office and residential accommodation, including the colourful twelve-storey Mezzino student apartments at Rialto Court, a Mecca Bingo hall, Burger King and the two-storey Grosvenor Casino, which opened in September 2011. Adjacent to the wharf is Castlegate Quay, which was once the town's main dock. The quayside is still occupied by Georgian warehouses which have been converted into a number of business units, restaurants, and a gym. A full-size replica of Captain James Cook's ship HM Bark Endeavour was once moored at the quayside, but was sold and moved after refurbishment to a mooring in Whitby. The Teesside Princess, a two-deck river boat, is docked alongside, and offers river cruises all year to Yarm via Preston Park.

Both the north and south banks of the Tees are retained by steel sheet pile walls, and have footpaths along the river edge. The Tees Walkway on the north bank of the river can be accessed from the town centre by the Teesquay Millennium Footbridge or the Riverside Footbridge, and incorporates a cycle path which forms part of the National Cycle Network.

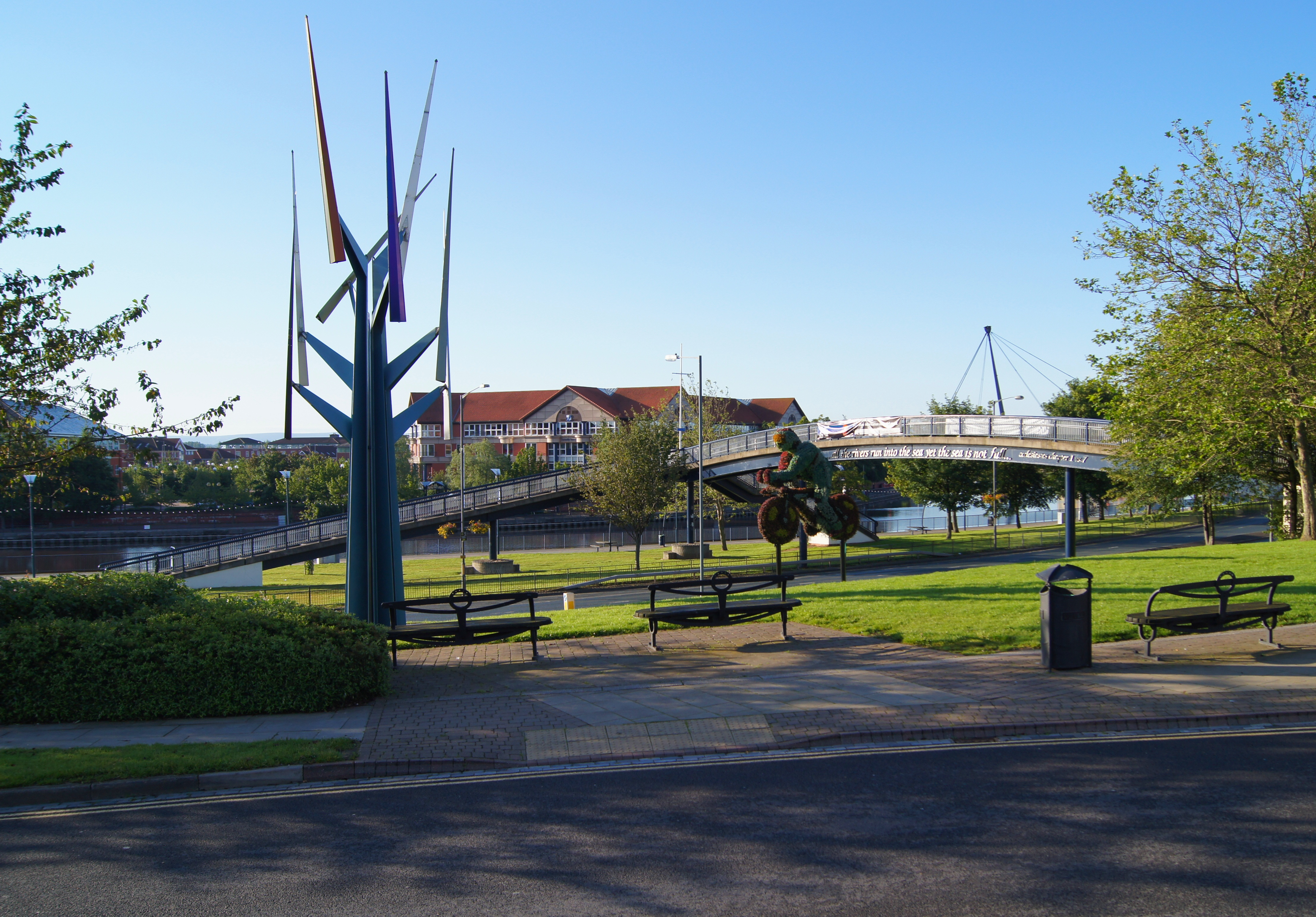
Aeolian Motion wind sculpture and view of the riverside at Stockton-on-Tees

The 11-metre Aeolian Motion wind sculpture stands on a grassy slope overlooking the riverside, which becomes an amphitheatre during large events. From Castlegate Quay, the tree-lined path along the waterfront toward the Princess of Wales Bridge opens into green space and a car park for events. Beyond the Princess of Wales Bridge, the slipway at the River Tees Watersports Centre is situated at the western area of Northshore, which is currently under development, and which leads to the Tees Barrage.

== Transport ==
=== Road ===
The town is served by two main arterial roads: the transpennine A66 (east/west) and the A19 (north/south). The A19 connects Stockton with York in the south, and extends to Peterlee and Sunderland, to the north. East of the town centre is the A1046, a mostly dual carriageway which runs through Portrack, as Portrack Lane, a retail zone, particularly for home furnishings and DIY. From Portrack, the A1046 continues to its northern terminus at Port Clarence. The A139 connects the town centre with the northern suburb of Norton. This was the original route for the A19 before a bypass was built to the east of the town.

The A177 runs from Stockton town centre to Durham. Known as Durham Road, it passes Sedgefield en route, and is a major route in to and out of Stockton.

The A66 connects Stockton directly to Middlesbrough (8 miles (13 km) to the east) and Darlington (10 miles (16 km) to the west). Beyond Darlington lies the A1(M). The A66 is connected to Stockton centre by the A135. The old A135 was renumbered A1027, and this continues through the town to Billingham. The A135 is named '1825 Way' to commemorate the former Stockton and Darlington Railway's opening; the 1825 Way's northern end is St John's Crossing, adjacent to the old Stockton Railway Station buildings.

Stockton town centre on the north bank of the Tees (to the left)

=== Rail ===
Stockton station, located above the High Street, serves the town; however, more regular and long-distance trains run from nearby Thornaby.

Northern routinely serves both stations with local and regional services, whereas at Thornaby TransPennine Express runs an hourly service between Redcar and Manchester Airport via York and LNER stops once both ways every weekday between Middlesbrough and London King's Cross.

The original Stockton railway station on the Stockton & Darlington Railway opened on 27 September 1825 as the terminus of the world's first public railway, which ran from Shildon via Darlington to Stockton-on-Tees. This station was located at St John's Crossing close to the river docks in Stockton, and the station served both early passenger and freight traffic until it closed in 1848. The former station buildings and weigh house from 1825 still survive and have Grade II heritage status, standing at 48 Bridge Road and visible as part of the town's railway history rather than part of the modern rail network.

=== Air ===
The nearest airport is Teesside International Airport several miles west of the town. It offers domestic and international flights.

== Economy ==
Stockton is famous as the home of the friction match and the Stockton and Darlington Railway, which operated the world's first steam-hauled passenger train in 1825. The town also has the world's oldest passenger railway station building. Industry and engineering remained central to Stockton's economy over many years, and major industries have included shipbuilding and repair, heavy engineering, steel, and chemicals manufacturing. However, during the twentieth century, Teesside's heavy industry declined dramatically.

=== Development ===
Since the 1980s, Stockton has seen an increase in service industries. The development of Teesdale Business Park on the south bank of the River Tees has created commercial space with many large service providers opening call centres and offices in the area. Durham University's Queen's Campus is also situated within the Teesdale development, which is linked to the town centre by the Teesquay Millennium Footbridge, Princess of Wales Bridge, and Infinity Bridge.

In 1995, after four years' construction, the Tees Barrage was commissioned, permanently holding the upstream river waters at the level of an average high tide.

In 2007, funding from the European Regional Development Fund and English Heritage secured the ruins of the Holy Trinity Church, and renovated the site into Trinity Green, removing the site from Historic England's 'Heritage At Risk register'.

=== Future development ===
Work is under way to develop the north bank of the River Tees in Stockton with the £300 million Northshore scheme, which will include new offices, leisure facilities, housing, a 150-bedroom hotel, and a new campus for Durham University.

In 2012, a long-term scheme aimed at transforming the town centre area was announced, with investment of approximately £38 million, just over £20 million being contributed by Stockton Borough Council, and the remainder coming from the private sector and grants. The investment programme aimed to attract more retailers, businesses, and shoppers to the town by opening up new spaces and links to the River Tees, providing easier access and parking, and capitalising on the town's heritage and cultural assets.

Plans include the introduction of an expansive plaza area 'Infinity View' that will open up the pedestrian area to dramatic views of the award-winning Infinity Bridge. Under the scheme, the banks of the River Tees will be transformed with a series of impressive light installations which will stretch along the waterfront, from the Princess of Wales Bridge to the Millennium Bridge. This permanent illumination is intended to add value to the riverside businesses and restaurants and play an important part in the council's events programme throughout the year.

Stockton is one of 12 towns in England to share in £1.2 million of funding, support from retail guru Mary Portas and her own team, as part of the Portas Pilot scheme. Selected from over 370 applications, Stockton's Town Team Consortium, comprising Stockton Council, Tees Music Alliance, Durham University Queen's Campus, town centre retailers, A Way Out and Stockton Heritage in Partnership, will have the opportunity to share in expert advice and guidance from a range of retail experts.

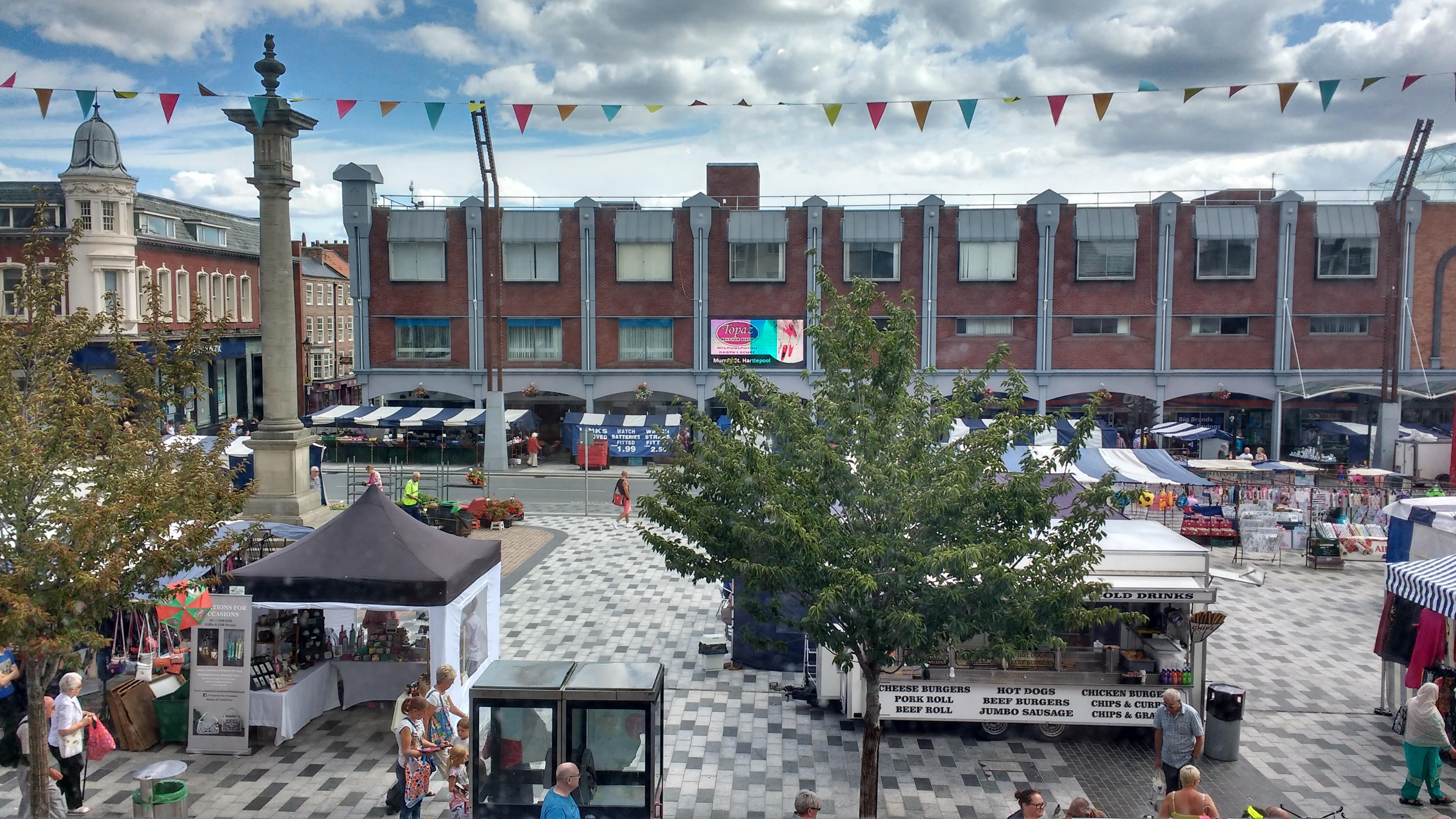
The High Street, Castlegate shops in the background are planned for demolition.

The Stockton-Middlesbrough Initiative is a 20-year vision for regenerating the urban core of the Tees Valley, the main focus being the 30 km^{2} (12 sq mi) area along the banks of the River Tees between the two centres of Stockton and Middlesbrough. The master plan has been drawn up by environmental design specialists Gillespies, the eventual aim being to bring distinctive high-quality city-scale assets to the centre of the Tees Valley, including the town centres of Stockton and Middlesbrough. The project will include the existing developments at North Shore, Stockton and Middlesbrough, with many others over a 15- to 20-year period.

In February 2020 it was announced that the Castlegate Shopping Centre was set to be demolished in 2022.

=== Income ===
The mean weekly income for Stockton residents was £522.70 in 2017. This is below the U.K. mean of £538.70. In some parts of Stockton, most households' income is below the poverty threshold. The mean privately rented house in Stockton cost £525 per month in 2017, compared with a mean of £480 across North East England.

== Crime ==
The town recorded 125 crimes for every 1,000 people in 2020, higher than similarly sized Darlington and Hartlepool and 29% higher than ceremonial County Durham's 89 out of 1,000 average. The most common crimes in 2020 were "violence and sexual offences"; 4,445 of this type were recorded in 2020. Eight out of 14 crime trends improved compared to 2019. The Eastbourne and Newham Grange Ward recorded the worst crime statistics in the town. The borough came out lower than the four other Tees Valley boroughs in 2017.

=== Enforcement ===
Stockton comes under Cleveland Police's jurisdiction. There are two police stations in town, town centre main and Newton neighbourhood. Teesside combined courts are located in Middlesbrough.

HMP Holme House, in Portrack, is a 1211-capacity Category B prison for male adult prisoners who are either remanded in custody, or convicted. It also accommodates a small number of young offenders, aged 18–21 years. The prison opened in May 1992 and mainly serves south of county Durham as well as north of North Yorkshire.

== Demographics ==
In 1666, when Stockton was granted a charter, there were only 120 families in residence. In 1801, Stockton had 4,000 inhabitants.

In the 2021 census, the borough was recorded as having a population of 196,595, with 50.9% being female.

For religion, 51.1% identified themselves as Christian, 39.1% having no religion, 3.4% Muslim, 0.4% Hindu, 0.4% Sikh, 0.3% Buddhist, and 0.3% answering 'Other' as well as 5% not answering.

For ethnicity, those who identified as White were 92.0%, Asian, Asian British or Asian Welsh were 4.6%, Black, Black British, Black Welsh, Caribbean or African were 1.1%, mixed or 'multiple ethnic groups' were 1.4%, and the 'other' ethnic group category recorded 0.8%.

For sexuality, those who identified as straight or heterosexual were 91.6%, gay or lesbian were 1.4%, bisexual was 0.9%, pansexual was 0.2%, asexual was 0.0%, queer was 0.0%, 'all other sexual orientations' were 0.0% and those who did not answer were 5.9%.

(Note, for percentages with 0.0%, this may due to a number too low to represent using the number of digits supplied rather than a lack of those who identified as that specific identity.)

Sex
2021 Census	Count	%
All usual residents	196,595	100.0
Female	100,072	50.9
Male	96,523	49.1

Ethnicity
2021 Census	count	%
All usual residents	196,593	100.0
Asian, Asian British or Asian Welsh	9,052	4.6
Black, Black British, Black Welsh, Caribbean or African	2,203	1.1
Mixed or multiple ethnic groups	2,737	1.4
White	180,937	92.0
Other ethnic group	1,664	0.8

Religion
2021 Census	count	%
All usual residents	196,595	100.0
No religion	76,840	39.1
Christian	100,420	51.1
Buddhist	532	0.3
Hindu	811	0.4
Jewish	61	0.0
Muslim	6,675	3.4
Sikh	782	0.4
Other religion	550	0.3
Not answered	9,924	5.0

=== Festivals and fairs ===
Stockton Calling is an Easter Sunday music festival which has taken place across several of Stockton's music venues annually since 2010. In 2019, it celebrated its 11th year, and was headlined by Sophie and the Giants.

The Stockton International Riverside Festival (SIRF), one of Europe's largest open air festivals, has taken over the town once a year since 1988. Spread over a long weekend, for either four or five days, it attracts over 250,000 visitors, and features a variety of acts such as circus, comedy, music, dance and street theatre.

The annual riverside firework display happens on the first Sunday closest to 5 November, and is typically attended by up to 100,000 spectators from the wider region. The year's events always conclude with the Stockton Sparkles Christmas festival and associated markets.

=== Theatres and music venues ===
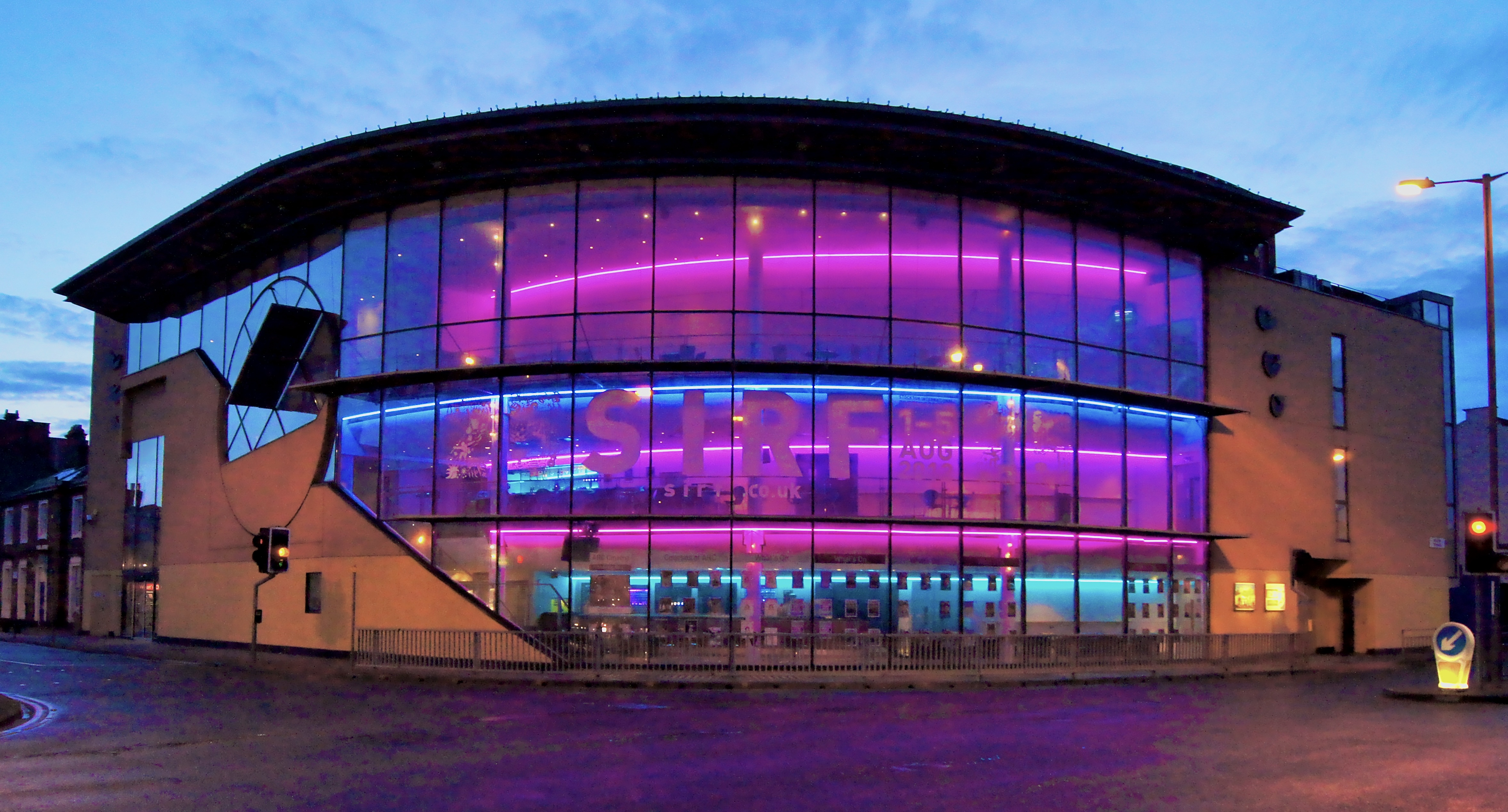
The ARC Theatre & Arts Centre, Dovecot Street

The ARC Theatre & Arts Centre on Dovecot Street was built in 1999, and comprises a multi-purpose arts centre for cinema, theatre, dance, and music. It has three floors including four venues: a 260-seat theatre, a 100-seat studio theatre, a point/music area accommodating 550 standing, and a 130-seat cinema. It also has exhibition spaces, meeting rooms, a café, and two bars.

The Georgian Theatre at Green Dragon Yard is Grade II listed, and is the oldest Georgian theatre in the country. Originally opened in 1766, it fell into disrepair during the 19th century, but later functioned as a sweet factory and then a community building. Between 2007 and 2008, the building was given a full makeover along with the neighbouring Green Dragon Studios, and now serves as an intimate venue for live entertainment with a capacity of 200.

The Grade-II listed Globe Theatre built in 1936 is at the north western end of the High Street, the theatre reopened in 2021 following extensive restoration. It was built on the same site as two previous theatres, and has hosted many famous acts such as Buddy Holly, the Platters, Guy Mitchell, the Rolling Stones, the Animals, Cilla Black, Carl Perkins, Cliff Richard, the Shadows and Chuck Berry. The Beatles famously played the Globe on Friday, 22 November 1963, the day U.S. President John F. Kennedy was assassinated.

=== Public art ===
==== Stockton Flyer ====
On 12 June 2016, Stockton Council launched The Stockton Flyer, a stylised model of a flying steam locomotive in a plinth on Stockton High Street. The Flyer was unveiled to mark Queen Elizabeth II's official 90th birthday on 12 June 2016. The Stockton Flyer appears from the plinth every day at 1 p.m., and often draws a crowd of people watching the rising and lowering of the structure. The plinth also features a carved poem, "The Infinite Town" by Mark Robinson.

==== Aeolian Motion ====
Designed by Phil Johnson of Ratho Forge, the wind sculpture Aeolian Motion was constructed at the end of Silver Street in March and April 2001. The design is said to impart a unique identity to the seating area, reflecting the character of Stockton, and creating a sense of place.

== Media ==
Local news and television programmes are provided by BBC North East and Cumbria and ITV Tyne Tees. The community television station TalkTeesside also broadcasts to the town. Television signals are received from the Bilsdale TV transmitter. Local radio stations are BBC Radio Tees, Heart North East, Hits Radio Teesside, Capital North East, Smooth North East, Greatest Hits Radio Teesside and CVFM Radio, a community based station that broadcast from nearby Middlesbrough. The town is served by the local newspaper, Evening Gazette.

== Facilities ==
Public services provided in Stockton include a general hospital, health advice centres, dental and medical surgeries, a library, churches, employment advice centres, youth projects, energy advice centres and an international family centre. A cluster of municipal buildings is concentrated primarily along Church Road. The police headquarters is the only emergency service station located within the centre, next to Stockton Central Library.

Stockton's University Hospital of North Tees serves south east County Durham. It is part of the North Tees and Hartlepool NHS Trust.

=== Public parks ===
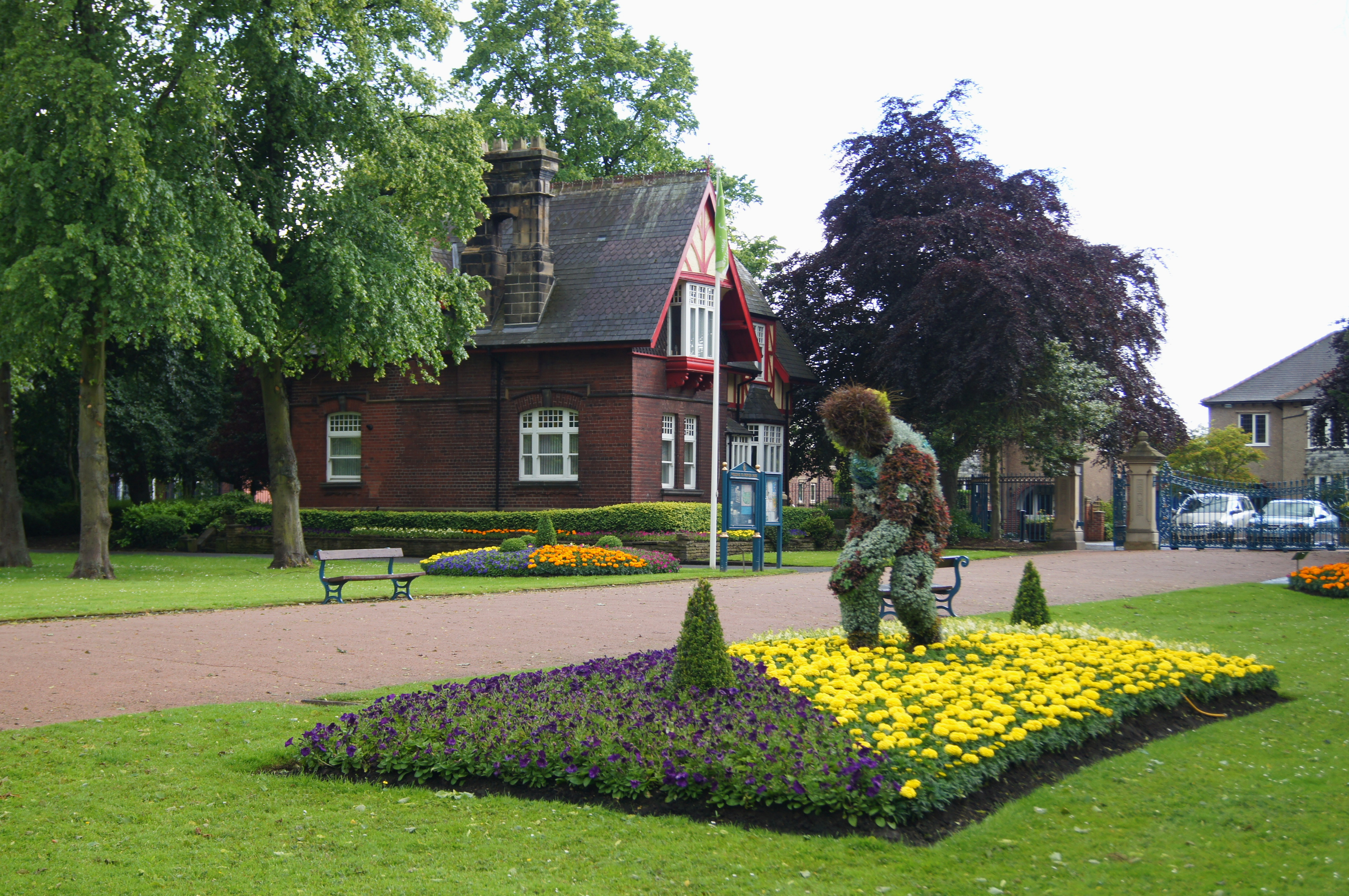
Ropner Park Lodge

Stockton has a number of public parks and nature reserves. Most notable is Ropner Park, a Victorian park on the outskirts of the town, near Hartburn village. Opened in 1893 and renovated in 2007, the park has tree-lined avenues approaching an ornate water fountain, surrounded by rockeries and floral displays. Overlooking a lake, a bandstand features live band music on Sunday afternoons in the summer. Seasonal fairs and occasional organised events are staged at the park throughout the year. Close by, there is also the smaller park housing the ruins of the Holy Trinity Church, now called Trinity Green.

Further upstream is Preston Park, a 100 acres (40 ha) public park by the River Tees. The park hosts many events each year that attract people from across Teesside and further afield. Preston Hall, once the home of Sir Robert Ropner, is situated within the grounds, and is now a museum. The park also houses 'Butterfly World', an artificial tropical environment housing various species of exotic butterflies and reptiles.

Downstream is Portrack Marsh Nature Reserve, a 50 acres (20 ha) nature reserve by the northern bank of the river between the Tees Barrage and the Tees Viaduct near Portrack housing estate. It is the last remaining wetland on the lower Tees. Ownership of the reserve is divided between the Tees Valley Wildlife Trust and Northumbrian Water, but the reserve is managed by the Tees Valley Wildlife Trust. The western and northern parts of the reserve are mature marsh, while there are a series of man–made ponds in the south east.

=== Leisure ===
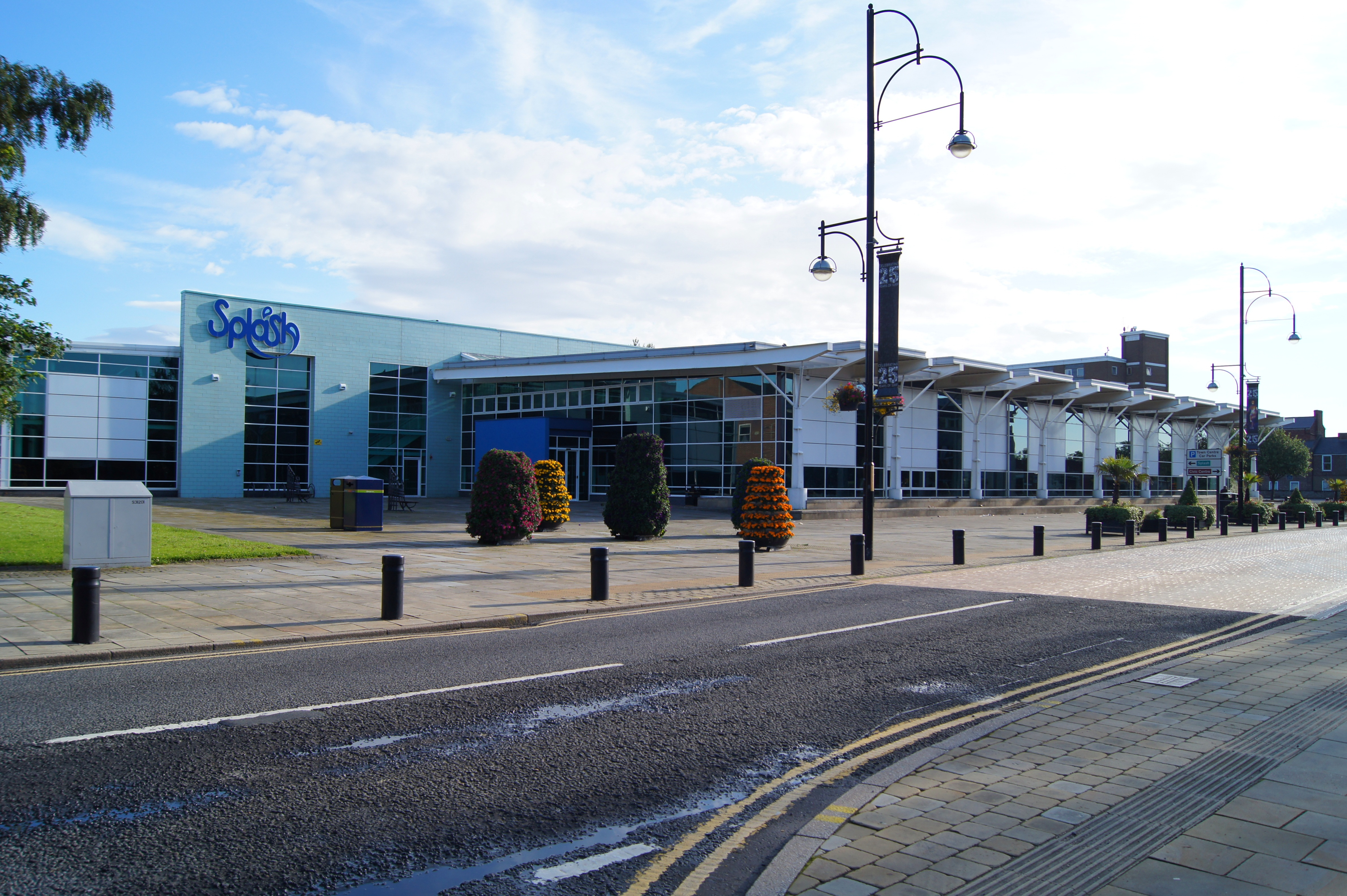
Splash Leisure Centre, Church Road

The town's main leisure facility is 'Splash', a large wet and dry facility, on Church Road. It has a 25m pool with a wave machine and flumes, a learner pool, a spa pool, as well as fitness and dance facilities. The Castlegate Quay Watersports Centre also offers opportunities for sailing and paddling on the River Tees.

=== Libraries ===
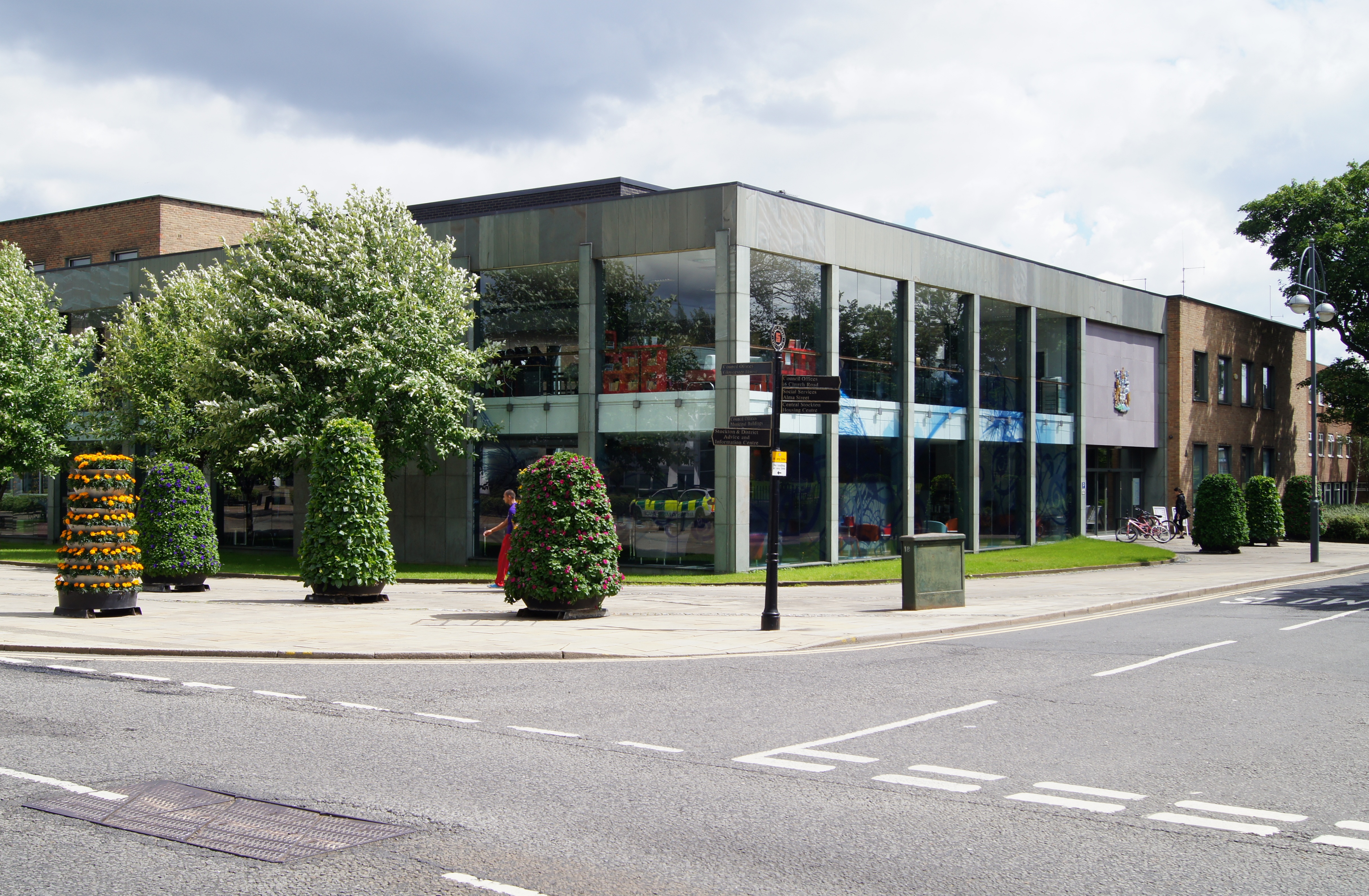
Stockton Central Library on Church Road

Stockton Central Library on Church Road is the largest public library serving the borough of Stockton-on-Tees. Built in 1967, it was fully refurbished in 2011 at a cost of £1.9m. It occupies two floors: the ground floor incorporates Stockton Borough Council's Customer Services Centre, an adult lending library, and a children's library, while the first floor houses the reference library (the central reference department for the borough), a family history suite, a computer suite with free internet access, and the 'Starbooks' café. The library also has conference facilities and an exhibition area.

== Religion ==
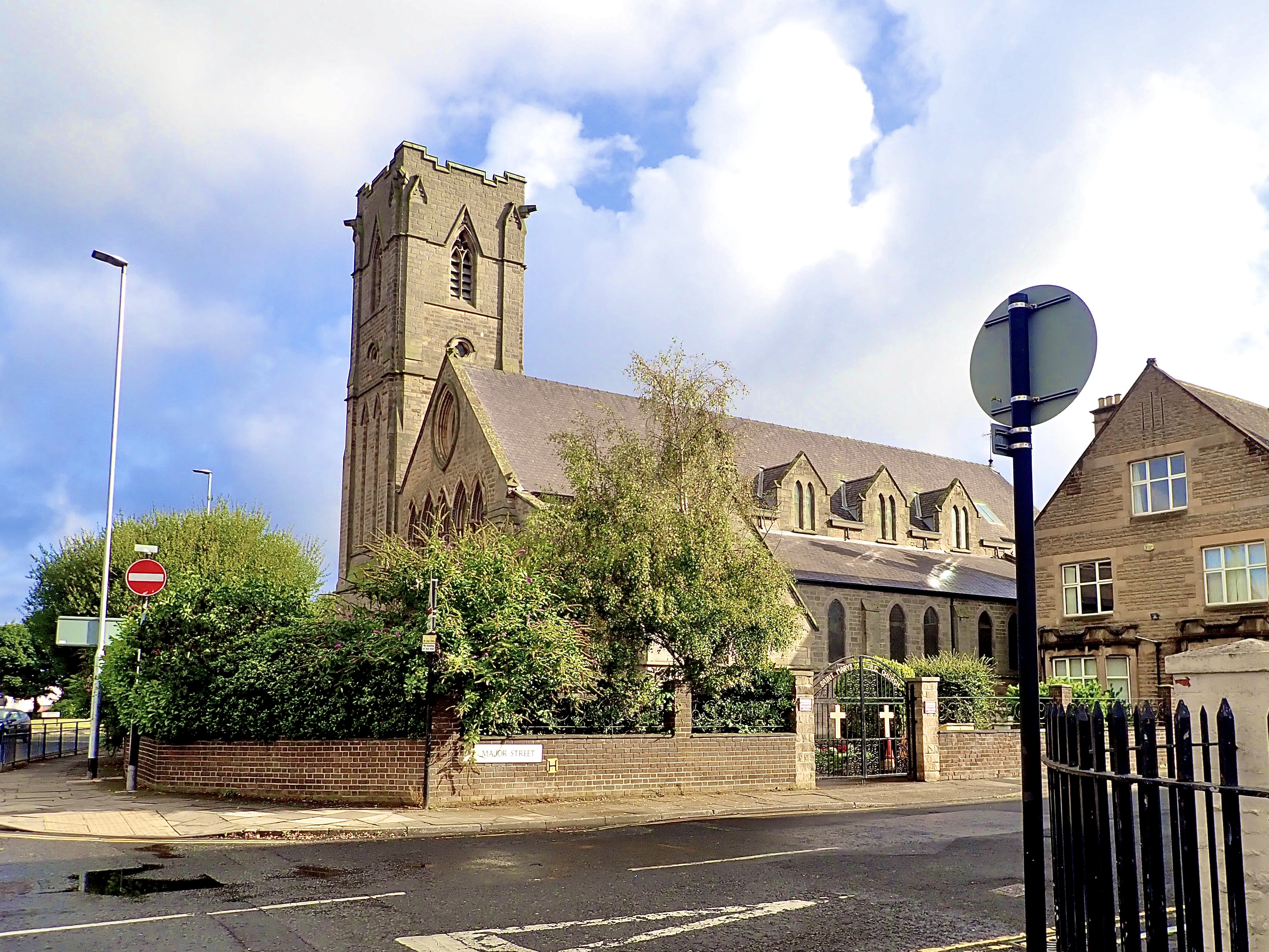
St Mary's RC Church

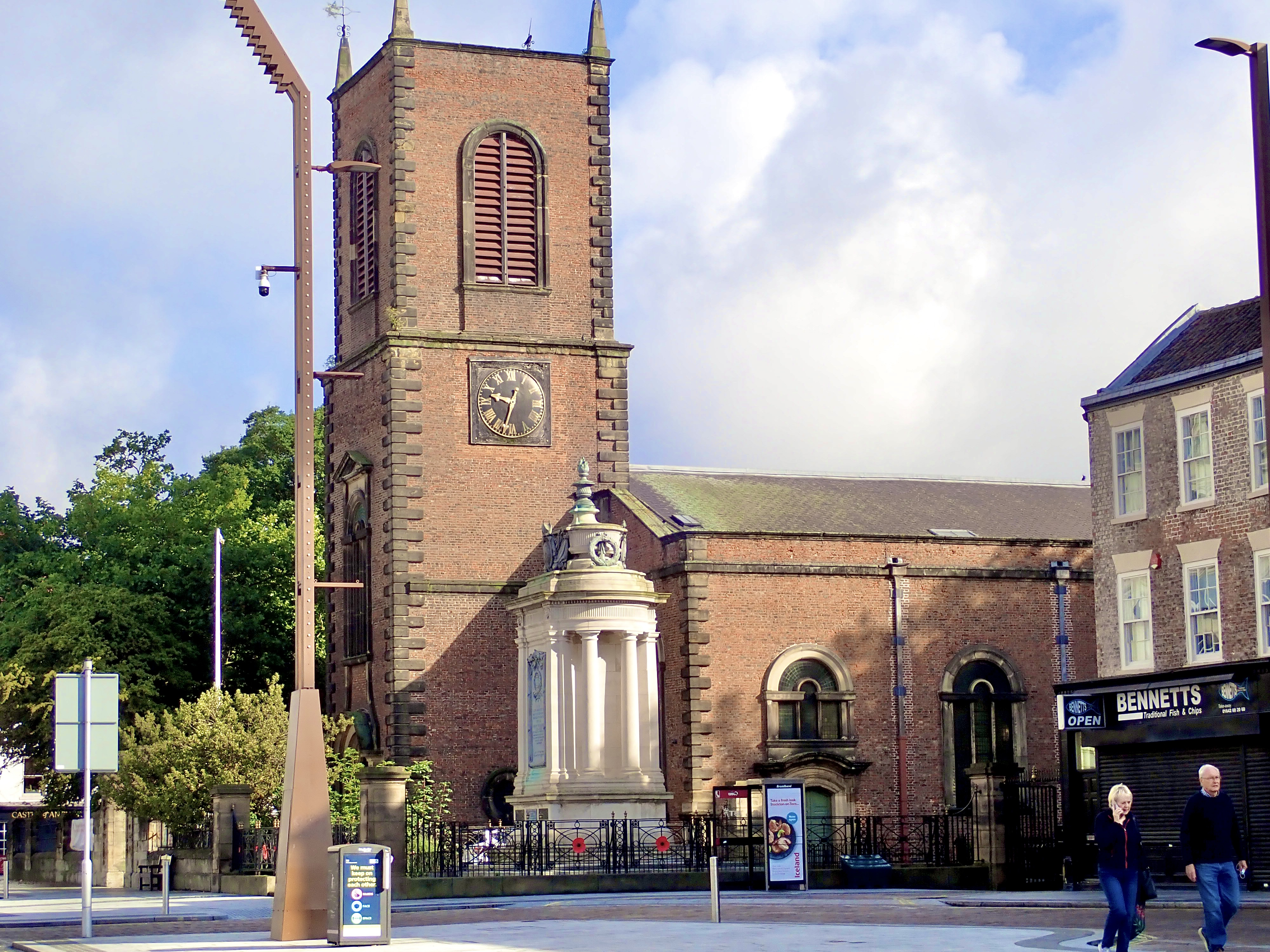
Stockton Parish Church

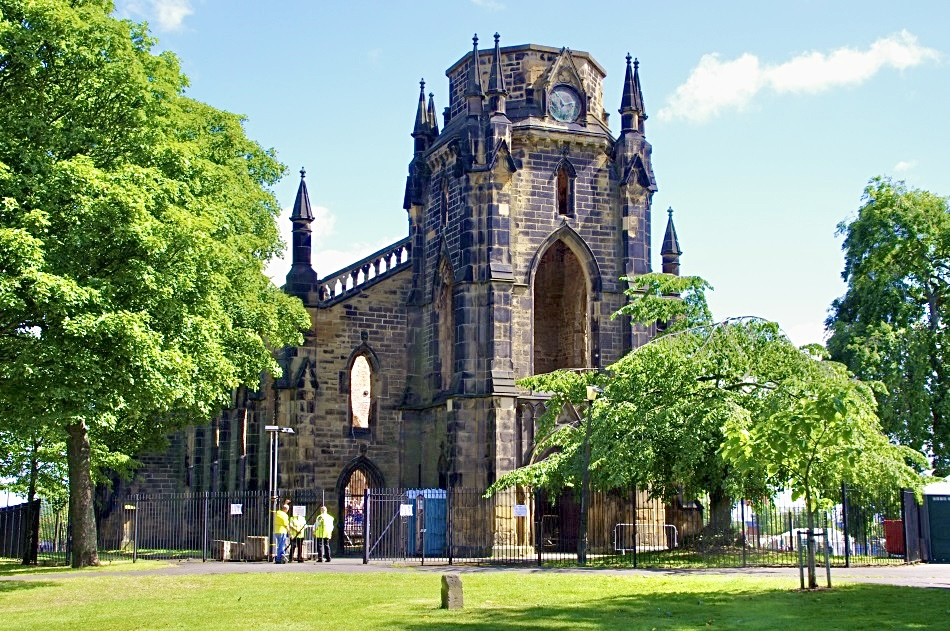
Holy Trinity Church

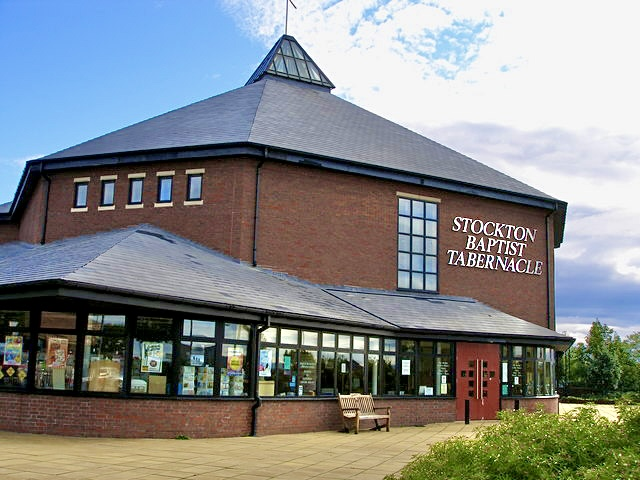
Stockton Baptist Tabernacle

Stockton is a Church of England deanery of the Archdeaconry of Auckland, in the Diocese of Durham. The churches of St Peter, Stockton Parish Church (St Thomas'), and St Paul are in the town. Holy Trinity Church was built as an Anglican church, but later became Greek Orthodox. It was destroyed by fire in 1991. The ruins remain on site.

Stockton is in the Roman Catholic Diocese of Hexham and Newcastle, and is home to the parishes of St Bede, St Cuthbert, English Martyrs and SS Peter and Paul, St Joseph, St Mary, and St Patrick.

Stockton also has a Muslim community (6,675), with mosques such as Farooq E Azam Mosque and Islamic Centre serving this community. The Farooq E Azam mosque is especially of note, due to the council decision to allow the call to prayer, or Adhan, to be played once at week at an agreed volume, the first mosque in the north-east of England to do so.

== Sport ==
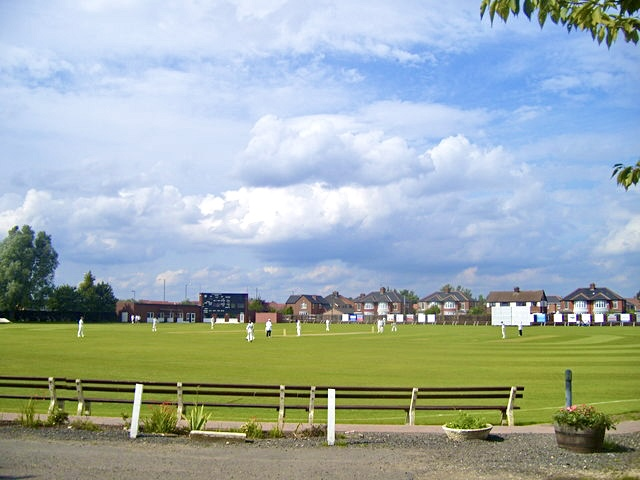
Grangefield Cricket Ground

Stockton Cricket Club was established in 1816, and has been located at the Grangefield Cricket Ground since 1891. The club currently fields three senior teams at weekends in the 1st, 2nd and 3rd Divisions of the Dukes North East Premier League.

Stockton Football Club existed from 1882 until it folded in 1975. They played at the Victoria Ground which also held greyhound racing (one of two venues in the town to do so along with Belle Vue Park). The club's assets were transferred to Norton Cricket Club, who subsequently founded the Norton & Stockton Ancients Football Club. There are two other football clubs in the town. Stockton Town F.C. play in the Northern Premier League Premier Division. After consecutive promotions winning the Wearside League in 2016 and Northern League Division 2 in 2017, then gaining promotion to Step 4 of the pyramid system as a result of 2 curtailed seasons due to Covid. In May 2024 gained promotion to Step 3 via a Play Off victory over Dunston UTS. Meanwhile, Stockton West End currently play in the North Riding Football League Premier Division.

Stockton Rugby Club, established in 1873, is the local Rugby Union team. Home games are now played at the Grangefield Ground following a community partnership agreement with Stockton Cricket club and Grangefield Academy in 2015.

== Notable people ==
People born in Stockton include:

- Francis Arthur Bainbridge, physiologist
- Matthew Bates, footballer
- Jamie Bell, actor
- Neal Bishop, footballer
- C. J. Bolland, electronic music producer in Belgium
- Daniel Casey, actor
- Lee Cattermole, footballer
- Ivy Close, actress
- Edward Cooper, soldier, recipient of the Victoria Cross
- Brass Crosby, Lord Mayor of London
- Freddie Dixon, motorcycle and car racing driver
- Lesley Duncan, pop singer-songwriter
- Maurice Elvey, film director
- Kevin Forster, Olympic Marathon Runner
- Charles Foulkes, Canadian Army officer who served in the Second World War and became a four-star general
- Jonathan Franks, footballer
- James Gaddas, actor
- Martin Gray, footballer
- Will Hay, comic actor
- Richard Anthony Hewson, jazz-funk music producer
- Thomas Hornby, cricketer
- Peter Howells, cricketer
- Robert Icke, director and writer
- Heather Ingman, professor of English, novelist and journalist
- Jimmy James, comedian
- Richard Kilty, sprinter
- Macaulay Langstaff, footballer
- Jordan Nobbs, footballer
- Geoff Parling, England and British and Irish Lions rugby player
- Luke Pearson, cartoonist
- Colin Renfrew, archaeologist
- Joseph Ritson, literary critic and editor
- Franc Roddam, film director/producer
- Graham Rowntree, England rugby player
- Thomas Sheraton, furniture designer
- Michael Short, professor of Engineering and author
- Paul Smith, singer in rock band Maxïmo Park
- Peter Smithson, architect
- Calvert Spensley, American politician
- Bill Steer, co-founder and lead guitarist of extreme metal band Carcass
- Jeremy Swift, actor
- Bruce Thomas, new wave bass guitar backing musician
- Denis Thwaites, footballer murdered in the 2015 Sousse attacks
- Stephen Tompkinson, actor
- Lee Turnbull, footballer
- John Walker, inventor of the friction match
- Chris Williamson, Love Island contestant
- Eric Young, footballer

Other notable residents include:

- Duncan Bannatyne, entrepreneur, moved to Stockton when he was 30, before he made his fortune
- Alan Davey, former civil servant, council administrator and BBC Radio 3 controller
- Elizabeth Estensen, actress
- Don Heath, footballer, winner of the 1968–69 League Cup
- Harold Macmillan, MP for Stockton (1924–29, 1931–45), later Prime Minister (1957–63), invested as Earl of Stockton (1984)
- Michael Marks, founder of Marks & Spencer, started his business career in Stockton in 1883.
- George Orwell, author, resided for a year (1944–45) in Greystones, near Carlton, a village in the borough
- Bill Rodgers, Baron Rodgers of Quarry Bank, MP for the town (1962–83), co-founder of the SDP
- Ridley Scott and Tony Scott, film directors; both lived in Stockton during their youth

== Sources ==
- Smailes, AE (1960). North England. Edinburgh: Thomas Nelson & Sons Ltd.
