= Thomas Hornby =

English cricketer

Personal information
- Full name: Thomas Whitfield Hornby
- Born: 2 October 1831; Stockton-on-Tees, County Durham, England
- Died: 1 April 1900 (aged 68); Stockton-on-Tees, County Durham, England
- Batting: Left-handed

Career statistics
Competition	First-class
Matches	3
Runs scored	65
Batting average	10.83
100s/50s	–/–
Top score	22
Catches/stumpings	1/–
- Source: Cricinfo, 25 June 2019

Thomas Whitfield Hornby (2 October 1831 – 1 April 1900) was an English first-class cricketer.

Hornby was born at Stockton-on-Tees. He made three appearances in first-class cricket, the first of which came for a combined Yorkshire and Durham cricket team against Nottinghamshire at Stockton-on-Tees in 1858. His next appearance came for a combined Yorkshire with Stockton-on-Tees cricket team against Cambridgeshire in 1861, while his third appearance came for England against Surrey at The Oval in 1864. He scored 65 runs in his three first-class appearances, with a high score of 22. Outside of cricket he was a hotelier, with Hornby running the Black Lion Hotel on Stockton High Street in 1892. He died at Stockton-on-Tees in April 1900.
