= Oxbridge, Stockton-on-Tees =

Area of Stockton-on-Tees, England

Coordinates: 54.5615°N 1.3305°W

Oxbridge
- Location within County Durham
- Unitary authority: Stockton-on-Tees
- Ceremonial county: County Durham
- Region: North East
- Country: England
- Sovereign state: United Kingdom
- Post town: STOCKTON-ON-TEES
- Postcode district: TS18
- Police: Cleveland
- Fire: Cleveland
- Ambulance: North East

Oxbridge is an area of Stockton-on-Tees within the borough of Stockton-on-Tees and the ceremonial county of County Durham, England.

It is situated to the south-west of the town centre. In recent times, the area has been known for its high crime rate. In a 2019 article wrote by TeessideLive, Oxbridge was marked as a "hot spot" for residential burglaries, drug dealing, crime and anti-social behaviour.
