= Trinity Green =

Park in Stockton-on-Tees, England

Coordinates: 54.5602°N 1.3153°W

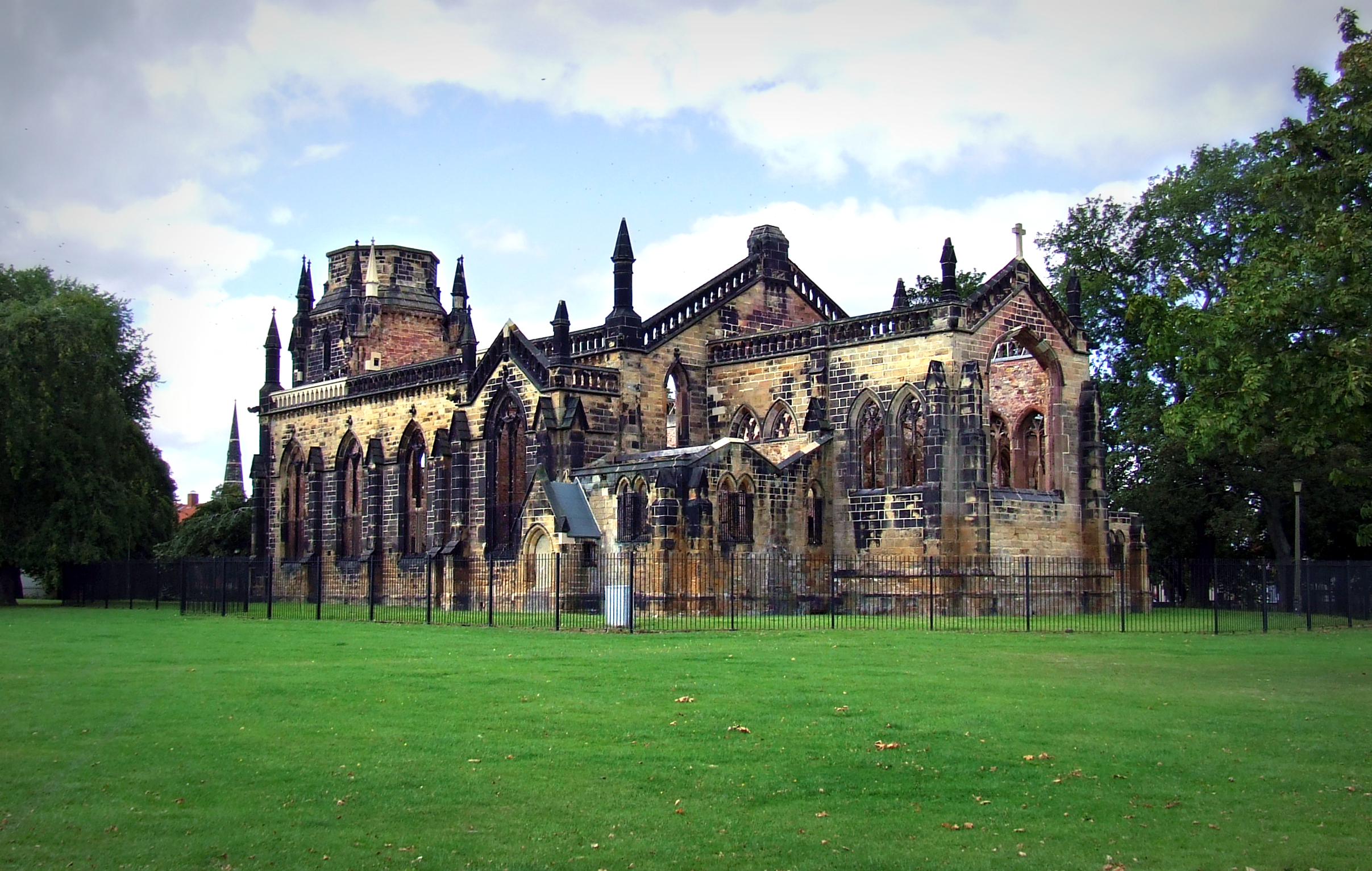
Trinity Green, 12 September 2010

Trinity Green is a public park located on the edge of Stockton Town Centre in Stockton-on-Tees, England. The park is dominated by the preserved ruins and Grade II* listed building of Holy Trinity Church which was gutted by fire in Autumn 1991. Trinity Green was given to the town of Stockton by Bishop William van Mildert at the start of the 19th century, and now serves a space open to the public, hosting occasional cultural and community events.

== History ==
In 1833 the then Bishop of Durham, William Van Mildert (1765–1836) gifted five acres and the land of an existing burial site called "The Monument" (originally a mass grave from a prior cholera outbreak) to the town of Stockton. Upon this land, the process of building of and designing Holy Trinity Church began, using funds originally allocated for church building in the Church Building Act 1818. It was designed by John and Benjamin Green, and construction began in 1834. It was consecrated as an Anglican church on 22 December 1835, making it the first parish church of Stockton. The church spire originally measured 200 feet high making it the tallest building in the area at the time, however, the top was lost during a gale in 1882.

Holy Trinity continued to serve the Anglican community of Stockton faithfully for many years, being listed as a Grade II* protected building on the 19 January 1951. In September 1955 it was reported that the churchyard was to be converted into an open space. From this point onwards, the area was designated a public park for local citizens, but the church itself continued to be in service.

The church continued to operate until 1982 when the decline in members and finances forced it to close. In 1985 the building was taken over by the Greek Orthodox church, but the church was plagued by vandalism until it was destroyed by fire in Autumn of 1991 and added to the 'Heritage at Risk register' by Historic England. The cause of the fire was never established.

The ruin continued to be vandalised until it was protected by a steel fence. In 2007, funding was secured to improve the site using funding from the European Regional Development Fund, as well as an additional £350,000 was secured through discussion between the local government and English Heritage. By 2009, the site had undergone renovation with works including boundary improvements, entrance features, seating, a heritage trail and interpretation panels and preparation works for illumination of the ruin. With the safety of the site being secured, the status of the protected building was removed from the Heritage at Risk register in June of that year.

The park is now the site of many of Stockton's cultural events such as Stockton International Riverside Festival and its carnival, as well hosts annual Remembrance Day services.

== Architecture ==
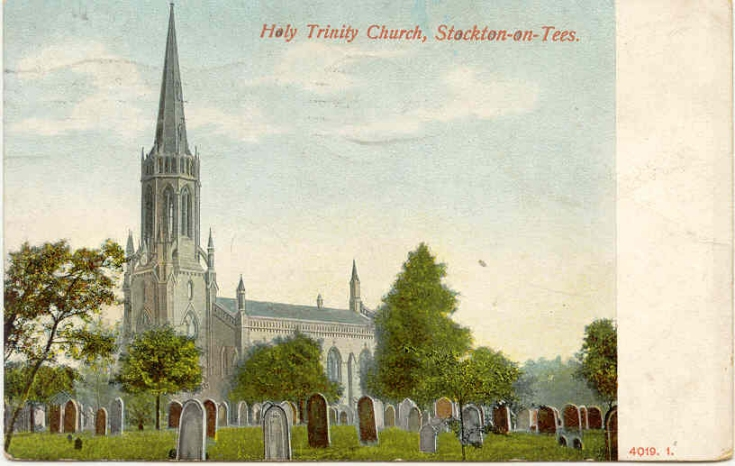
Holy Trinity Church depicted in a postcard from 1923.

The church once featured a highly ornamental exterior, however the decorated Gothic style still remains today.

The remaining building is entirely adorned with Ashlar stone. On each wall there are gabled buttresses with scrolled label stops, with set back buttresses at each corner. At each of these corners there are Pinnacle towers, with gargoyles below. Each wall is also arcaded with parapets built at the top, with each having a corbel arch with minimal gabled stone. There is a wide 4-bay nave with lower transepts with gabled extensions pointing towards the east. There are also a double bayed chancel. On the east of the transept, there is a small gabled porch.

The tower of the church is at west end, and displays a large hexagonal base for the now missing steeple, as well as the main entrance below. The tower has set back buttresses and pinnacles, a pointed doorway with label stops. There were also once coupled and decorated windows adjourning the chancel. These windows were in the Lancet and Rose styles, and were placed into the nave and transepts with 'poppyhead' label moulds. In the tower, there were once windows in blind tracery with arches above.
