= Hartburn, County Durham =

Area of Stockton, County Durham, England

Coordinates: 54.5582°N 1.3428°W

Hartburn
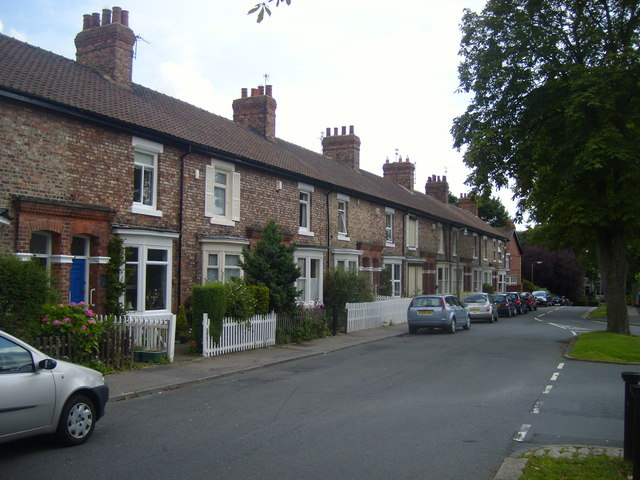

- Location within County Durham
- Population: 8,516
- Unitary authority: Stockton-on-Tees
- Ceremonial county: Durham
- Region: North East
- Country: England
- Sovereign state: United Kingdom
- Post town: STOCKTON-ON-TEES
- Postcode district: TS18
- Dialling code: 01642
- Police: Cleveland
- Fire: Cleveland
- Ambulance: North East

Hartburn is an area in the south west of Stockton-on-Tees in the Borough of Stockton-on-Tees, County Durham, England. The area was originally called East Hartburn to differentiate it with West Hartburn near Middleton St George.

== History ==
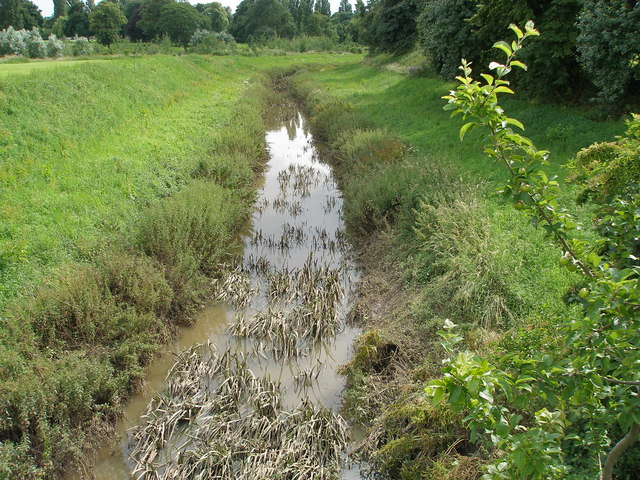
Hartburn Beck

In 1183, William de Hertburne (also written as William de Hertbourne) exchanged his land in what is now Hartburn for land in Washington, thereby adopting a new title: William de Wessyngton. This occasion is commemorated by a plaque outside the church of All Saints in the village, which was erected at the 800th anniversary (2 April 1983). A later descendant of William de Wessyngton was George Washington, the first President of the United States of America.

Just outside the centre of the area is the Elmwood community centre, Elmwood was the first of Hartburn’s large detached properties and it was built in 1873. It was originally the home of Mr Lewis Dodshon who was the owner of one of the largest wholesale grocers in the area. He was the son of John Dodshon, whose memorial is in the centre of Stockton. In the 1880s, it was the home of the Mountjoy Pearse family, who employed thousands in shipbuilding yards on the Tees and an iron company in Hartlepool.

In June 1890 Sir Robert Ropner offered Hartburn Fields as a public park. On 4 October 1893, Ropner Park was officially opened. Ropner also owned nearby Preston Hall, the land also became a public park called Preston Park.

In June 1897, a large stone was erected outside All Saints' church to commemorate the 60th year of the reign of Queen Victoria. All Saints' church had originally been the village school, and was eventually altered to include pews and chancel steps etc., although these no longer exist.

The village was founded centuries ago with its surrounding area been developed with mostly semi-detached housing from the 1930s onwards. It is north of the A66 road. There is a large grassed open space section stretching from Birkdale Road, parallel with Marrick Road and Grinton Road, towards Ropner Park.

East Hartburn was formerly a township in the parish of Stockton-upon-Tees, in 1866 East Hartburn became a separate civil parish, on 9 November 1913, the parish was abolished and merged with Stockton on Tees and Elton. In 1911 the parish had a population of 618.

== Education ==
The area contains a single school in Hartburn Primary School, located on Adelaide Grove.

== Transport ==
Three bus services formerly ran through Hartburn: The 87 by Tees Valley Stagecarriage, and the 98/99. The 588/589 run by Compass Royston are frequent bus routes through Hartburn. The 98/99 were the first routes to be withdrawn, which led to subsequent re-routing of the 588 past Harper Parade. The X66 and X67 services now serve Hartburn with services through Dunedin Avenue and Birkdale Road, with links to Darlington and Middlesbrough. At the moment, no routes permanently serve Hartburn Village but occasionally, route diversions for the X66/X67 serve it. Moorsbus have proposed re-routing their M3 service via Hartburn Village in the summer of 2024. It previously operated from Darlington to Danby via Middlesbrough and Guisborough.
