= List of United Kingdom locations: Sg-Sh =

The United Kingdom

This is part of the list of United Kingdom locations: a gazetteer of place names in the United Kingdom showing each place's locality and geographical coordinates.

== Sg ==
Location	Locality	Coordinates (links to map & photo sources)	OS grid reference
Sgeir a' Chail	Western Isles	57.70°N 07.10°W	NF960796
Sgeir a' Mhill	Western Isles	57.10°N 07.23°W	NF831133
Sgeir Iosal	Highland	58.40°N 05.13°W	NC1750
Sgeotasaigh	Western Isles	57.87°N 06.75°W	NG185973
Sgiogarstaigh	Western Isles	58.46°N 06.22°W	NB5461
Sgoir Beag	Highland	57.55°N 06.64°W	NG2261

== Sh ==
=== Sha ===
Location	Locality	Coordinates (links to map & photo sources)	OS grid reference
Shabbington	Buckinghamshire	51.75°N 01.04°W	SP6607
Shab Hill	Gloucestershire	51.83°N 02.10°W	SO9315
Shackerley	Shropshire	52.65°N 02.28°W	SJ8106
Shackerstone	Leicestershire	52.65°N 01.45°W	SK3706
Shacklecross	Derbyshire	52.90°N 01.37°W	SK4234
Shackleford	Surrey	51.19°N 00.67°W	SU9345
Shackleton	Calderdale	53.75°N 02.03°W	SD9829
Shacklewell	Islington	51.54°N 00.08°W	TQ3385
Shade	Calderdale	53.70°N 02.10°W	SD9323
Shadforth	Durham	54.75°N 01.47°W	NZ3440
Shadingfield	Suffolk	52.40°N 01.57°E	TM4384
Shadoxhurst	Kent	51.10°N 00.81°E	TQ9738
Shadsworth	Lancashire	53.73°N 02.45°W	SD7027
Shadwell	Norfolk	52.41°N 00.83°E	TL9383
Shadwell	Gloucestershire	51.67°N 02.31°W	ST7897
Shadwell	Tower Hamlets	51.50°N 00.05°W	TQ3580
Shadwell	Leeds	53.84°N 01.48°W	SE3439
Shaffalong	Staffordshire	53.06°N 02.06°W	SJ9652
Shaftenhoe End	Hertfordshire	52.01°N 00.03°E	TL4037
Shaftesbury	Dorset	50.99°N 02.20°W	ST8622
Shafton	Barnsley	53.59°N 01.41°W	SE3911
Shafton Two Gates	Barnsley	53.58°N 01.41°W	SE3910
Shaggs	Dorset	50.64°N 02.21°W	SY8583
Shakeford	Shropshire	52.84°N 02.49°W	SJ6728
Shakerley	Wigan	53.52°N 02.46°W	SD6903
Shakesfield	Gloucestershire	51.97°N 02.45°W	SO6931
Shalbourne	Wiltshire	51.36°N 01.55°W	SU3163
Shalcombe	Isle of Wight	50.66°N 01.44°W	SZ3985
Shalden	Hampshire	51.16°N 01.01°W	SU6941
Shalden Green	Hampshire	51.18°N 01.01°W	SU6943
Shaldon	Devon	50.53°N 03.51°W	SX9372
Shalfleet	Isle of Wight	50.69°N 01.42°W	SZ4189
Shalford	Surrey	51.20°N 00.56°W	TQ0046
Shalford	Somerset	51.06°N 02.41°W	ST7130
Shalford	Essex	51.93°N 00.50°E	TL7229
Shalford Green	Essex	51.91°N 00.48°E	TL7127
Shallowford	Devon	51.03°N 03.88°W	SS6828
Shallowford	Staffordshire	52.85°N 02.19°W	SJ8729
Shalmsford Street	Kent	51.24°N 00.99°E	TR0954
Shalstone	Buckinghamshire	52.01°N 01.06°W	SP6436
Shamley Green	Surrey	51.17°N 00.54°W	TQ0243
Shandon	Argyll and Bute	56.03°N 04.81°W	NS2586
Shandwick	Highland	57.75°N 03.93°W	NH8575
Shangton	Leicestershire	52.55°N 00.95°W	SP7196
Shankhouse	Northumberland	55.103°N 1.574°W	NZ273788
Shanklin	Isle of Wight	50.62°N 01.18°W	SZ5881
Shannochie	North Ayrshire	55.44°N 05.21°W	NR9721
Shannochill	Stirling	56.16°N 04.35°W	NS5499
Shap	Cumbria	54.52°N 02.68°W	NY5615
Shapinsay	Orkney Islands	59.04°N 02.87°W	HY499176
Shapridge	Gloucestershire	51.84°N 02.48°W	SO6716
Shapwick	Somerset	51.13°N 02.84°W	ST4138
Shapwick	Dorset	50.80°N 02.10°W	ST9301
Sharcott	Wiltshire	51.33°N 01.80°W	SU1459
Shard End	Birmingham	52.49°N 01.78°W	SP1588
Shardlow	Derbyshire	52.86°N 01.36°W	SK4330
Shareshill	Staffordshire	52.65°N 02.09°W	SJ9406
Sharlston	Wakefield	53.65°N 01.41°W	SE3918
Sharlston Common	Wakefield	53.66°N 01.42°W	SE3819
Sharmans Cross	Solihull	52.40°N 01.81°W	SP1379
Sharnal Street	Kent	51.43°N 00.57°E	TQ7974
Sharnbrook	Bedfordshire	52.22°N 00.55°W	SP9959
Sharneyford	Lancashire	53.71°N 02.18°W	SD8824
Sharnford	Leicestershire	52.51°N 01.29°W	SP4891
Sharnhill Green	Dorset	50.84°N 02.42°W	ST7005
Sharoe Green	Lancashire	53.79°N 02.71°W	SD5333
Sharow	North Yorkshire	54.13°N 01.51°W	SE3271
Sharpenhoe	Bedfordshire	51.95°N 00.45°W	TL0630
Sharperton	Northumberland	55.32°N 02.08°W	NT9503
Sharples	Bolton	53.59°N 02.45°W	SD7011
Sharpley Heath	Staffordshire	52.91°N 02.06°W	SJ9635
Sharpness	Gloucestershire	51.71°N 02.47°W	SO6702
Sharpnose Points	Cornwall	50.88°N 04.56°W	SS199125
Sharpsbridge	East Sussex	50.96°N 00.03°E	TQ4320
Sharp's Corner	East Sussex	50.93°N 00.23°E	TQ5717
Sharpstone	Bath and North East Somerset	51.32°N 02.31°W	ST7859
Sharp Street	Norfolk	52.72°N 01.52°E	TG3820
Sharpthorne	West Sussex	51.07°N 00.04°W	TQ3732
Sharptor	Cornwall	50.53°N 04.47°W	SX2573
Sharpway Gate	Worcestershire	52.28°N 02.07°W	SO9565
Sharrington	Norfolk	52.88°N 01.01°E	TG0336
Sharrow	Sheffield	53.36°N 01.49°W	SK3485
Sharston	Manchester	53.38°N 02.25°W	SJ8388
Shatterford	Worcestershire	52.42°N 02.31°W	SO7981
Shatterling	Kent	51.27°N 01.23°E	TR2658
Shatton	Derbyshire	53.33°N 01.71°W	SK1982
Shaugh Prior	Devon	50.44°N 04.05°W	SX5463
Shavington	Cheshire	53.05°N 02.46°W	SJ6951
Shaw	Swindon	51.56°N 01.84°W	SU1185
Shaw	Berkshire	51.40°N 01.31°W	SU4868
Shaw	Wiltshire	51.38°N 02.17°W	ST8865
Shaw	Bradford	53.81°N 01.97°W	SE0235
Shaw	Oldham	53.56°N 02.10°W	SD9308
Shawbank	Shropshire	52.44°N 02.79°W	SO4683
Shawbirch	Shropshire	52.71°N 02.53°W	SJ6413
Shawbury	Shropshire	52.78°N 02.66°W	SJ5521
Shawclough	Rochdale	53.62°N 02.18°W	SD8814
Shaw Common	Gloucestershire	51.94°N 02.45°W	SO6927
Shawdon Hall	Northumberland	55.42°N 01.85°W	NU0914
Shawell	Leicestershire	52.41°N 01.20°W	SP5480
Shawfield	Rochdale	53.62°N 02.19°W	SD8714
Shawfield	Staffordshire	53.14°N 01.91°W	SK0661
Shawfield Head	North Yorkshire	53.95°N 01.62°W	SE2551
Shawford	Hampshire	51.01°N 01.34°W	SU4624
Shawford	Somerset	51.27°N 02.30°W	ST7953
Shawforth	Lancashire	53.67°N 02.16°W	SD8920
Shaw Green	Hertfordshire	51.97°N 00.12°W	TL2932
Shaw Green	North Yorkshire	53.96°N 01.60°W	SE2652
Shaw Green	Lancashire	53.65°N 02.72°W	SD5218
Shawhead	Dumfries and Galloway	55.05°N 03.77°W	NX8775
Shawhead	North Lanarkshire	55.84°N 04.03°W	NS7363
Shaw Heath	Cheshire	53.30°N 02.36°W	SJ7679
Shaw Heath	Stockport	53.39°N 02.16°W	SJ8989
Shaw Lands	Barnsley	53.55°N 01.50°W	SE3306
Shawlands	City of Glasgow	55.82°N 04.30°W	NS5661
Shaw Mills	North Yorkshire	54.05°N 01.61°W	SE2562
Shawsburn	South Lanarkshire	55.72°N 03.96°W	NS7750
Shaw Side	Oldham	53.56°N 02.10°W	SD9308
Shawton	South Lanarkshire	55.70°N 04.10°W	NS6848
Shawtonhill	South Lanarkshire	55.71°N 04.11°W	NS6749
Shay Gate	Bradford	53.81°N 01.84°W	SE1035

=== She ===
Location	Locality	Coordinates (links to map & photo sources)	OS grid reference
Shearsby	Leicestershire	52.50°N 01.08°W	SP6290
Shearston	Somerset	51.06°N 03.02°W	ST2830
Shebbear	Devon	50.85°N 04.23°W	SS4309
Shebdon	Staffordshire	52.82°N 02.35°W	SJ7625
Shebster	Highland	58.54°N 03.70°W	ND0163
Sheddens	East Renfrewshire	55.78°N 04.28°W	NS5757
Sheddocksley	City of Aberdeen	57.15°N 02.18°W	NJ8907
Shedfield	Hampshire	50.91°N 01.20°W	SU5613
Sheen	Staffordshire	53.14°N 01.83°W	SK1161
Sheepbridge	Derbyshire	53.26°N 01.44°W	SK3774
Sheepdrove	Berkshire	51.50°N 01.52°W	SU3379
Sheep Hill	Durham	54.90°N 01.73°W	NZ1757
Sheep Island	Argyll and Bute	55.29°N 05.56°W	NR735055
Sheeplane	Bedfordshire	51.96°N 00.64°W	SP9330
Sheepridge	Buckinghamshire	51.59°N 00.73°W	SU8889
Sheepridge	Kirklees	53.66°N 01.77°W	SE1519
Sheepscar	Leeds	53.80°N 01.53°W	SE3134
Sheepscombe	Gloucestershire	51.78°N 02.16°W	SO8910
Sheepstor	Devon	50.48°N 04.04°W	SX5567
Sheepwash	Devon	50.83°N 04.16°W	SS4806
Sheepwash	Northumberland	55.15°N 01.60°W	NZ2585
Sheepway	North Somerset	51.48°N 02.73°W	ST4976
Sheepy Magna	Leicestershire	52.60°N 01.52°W	SK3201
Sheepy Parva	Leicestershire	52.60°N 01.51°W	SK3301
Sheering	Essex	51.79°N 00.17°E	TL5013
Sheerness	Kent	51.44°N 00.74°E	TQ9175
Sheerwater	Surrey	51.33°N 00.53°W	TQ0260
Sheet	Hampshire	51.01°N 00.93°W	SU7524
Sheet	Shropshire	52.36°N 02.69°W	SO5374
Sheet's Heath	Surrey	51.30°N 00.65°W	SU9457
Sheffield	Cornwall	50.07°N 05.56°W	SW4526
Sheffield	South Yorkshire	53.37°N 01.47°W	SK3587
Sheffield Bottom	Berkshire	51.41°N 01.08°W	SU6469
Sheffield Green	East Sussex	50.99°N 00.01°E	TQ4124
Sheffield Park	Sheffield	53.37°N 01.46°W	SK3686
Shefford	Bedfordshire	52.03°N 00.33°W	TL1439
Shefford Woodlands	Berkshire	51.45°N 01.48°W	SU3673
Sheigra	Highland	58.49°N 05.12°W	NC1860
Shieldmuir	North Lanarkshire	55.77°N 03.96°W	NS7755
Sheinton	Shropshire	52.62°N 02.57°W	SJ6103
Shelderton	Shropshire	52.38°N 02.88°W	SO4077
Sheldon	Devon	50.86°N 03.25°W	ST1208
Sheldon	Birmingham	52.45°N 01.78°W	SP1584
Sheldon	Derbyshire	53.20°N 01.74°W	SK1768
Sheldwich	Kent	51.26°N 00.88°E	TR0156
Sheldwich Lees	Kent	51.26°N 00.88°E	TR0156
Shelf	Bridgend	51.50°N 03.54°W	SS9380
Shelf	Calderdale	53.74°N 01.81°W	SE1228
Shelfanger	Norfolk	52.40°N 01.08°E	TM1083
Shelfield	Warwickshire	52.25°N 01.82°W	SP1262
Shelfield	Walsall	52.61°N 01.95°W	SK0302
Shelfield Green	Warwickshire	52.24°N 01.82°W	SP1261
Shelfleys	Northamptonshire	52.20°N 00.93°W	SP7357
Shelford	Warwickshire	52.48°N 01.38°W	SP4288
Shelford	Nottinghamshire	52.97°N 01.01°W	SK6642
Shell	Worcestershire	52.22°N 02.07°W	SO9559
Shelland	Suffolk	52.20°N 00.92°E	TM0060
Shellbrook	Leicestershire	52.74°N 01.51°W	SK3316
Shelley	Suffolk	52.00°N 00.95°E	TM0338
Shelley	Essex	51.72°N 00.24°E	TL5505
Shelley	Kirklees	53.59°N 01.69°W	SE2011
Shelley Woodhouse	Kirklees	53.58°N 01.68°W	SE2110
Shell Green	Cheshire	53.37°N 02.70°W	SJ5387
Shellingford	Oxfordshire	51.63°N 01.55°W	SU3193
Shellow Bowells	Essex	51.73°N 00.31°E	TL6007
Shellwood Cross	Surrey	51.19°N 00.26°W	TQ2145
Shelsley Beauchamp	Worcestershire	52.26°N 02.39°W	SO7363
Shelsley Walsh	Worcestershire	52.25°N 02.41°W	SO7262
Shelthorpe	Leicestershire	52.74°N 01.21°W	SK5317
Shelton	Norfolk	52.46°N 01.26°E	TM2290
Shelton	Bedfordshire	52.30°N 00.49°W	TL0368
Shelton	City of Stoke-on-Trent, Staffordshire	53.01°N 02.19°W	SJ8746
Shelton	Nottinghamshire	52.98°N 00.83°W	SK7844
Shelton	Shropshire	52.71°N 02.80°W	SJ4613
Shelton Lock	City of Derby	52.87°N 01.45°W	SK3731
Shelton under Harley	Staffordshire	52.94°N 02.28°W	SJ8139
Shelve	Shropshire	52.57°N 02.99°W	SO3398
Shelvin	Devon	50.82°N 03.19°W	ST1604
Shelvingford	Kent	51.34°N 01.17°E	TR2165
Shelwick	Herefordshire	52.08°N 02.70°W	SO5243
Shelwick Green	Herefordshire	52.08°N 02.70°W	SO5243
Shenfield	Essex	51.63°N 00.32°E	TQ6195
Shenington	Oxfordshire	52.07°N 01.46°W	SP3742
Shenley	Hertfordshire	51.68°N 00.27°W	TL1900
Shenley Brook End	Milton Keynes	52.00°N 00.79°W	SP8335
Shenleybury	Hertfordshire	51.69°N 00.29°W	TL1801
Shenley Church End	Milton Keynes	52.01°N 00.79°W	SP8336
Shenley Fields	Birmingham	52.42°N 01.97°W	SP0281
Shenley Lodge	Milton Keynes	52.01°N 00.77°W	SP8436
Shenley Wood	Milton Keynes	52.01°N 00.80°W	SP8236
Shenmore	Herefordshire	52.03°N 02.89°W	SO3938
Shenstone	Worcestershire	52.35°N 02.20°W	SO8673
Shenstone	Staffordshire	52.63°N 01.85°W	SK1004
Shenstone Woodend	Staffordshire	52.61°N 01.83°W	SK1102
Shenton	Leicestershire	52.59°N 01.44°W	SK3800
Shenval	Moray	57.34°N 03.31°W	NJ2129
Shepeau Stow	Lincolnshire	52.69°N 00.07°W	TF3012
Shephall	Hertfordshire	51.89°N 00.18°W	TL2523
Shepherd Hill	Wakefield	53.67°N 01.57°W	SE2820
Shepherd's Bush	Hammersmith and Fulham	51.50°N 00.24°W	TQ2280
Shepherd's Gate	Norfolk	52.73°N 00.29°E	TF5518
Shepherd's Green	Oxfordshire	51.54°N 00.97°W	SU7183
Shepherd's Hill	Surrey	51.08°N 00.71°W	SU9032
Shepherd's Patch	Gloucestershire	51.73°N 02.40°W	SO7204
Shepherd's Port	Norfolk	52.86°N 00.45°E	TF6533
Shepherdswell or Sibertswold	Kent	51.17°N 01.21°E	TR2547
Shepley	Kirklees	53.57°N 01.71°W	SE1909
Shepperdine	South Gloucestershire	51.65°N 02.56°W	ST6195
Shepperton	Surrey	51.39°N 00.46°W	TQ0767
Shepperton Green	Surrey	51.39°N 00.46°W	TQ0767
Shepreth	Cambridgeshire	52.10°N 00.02°E	TL3947
Shepshed	Leicestershire	52.76°N 01.30°W	SK4719
Shepton Beauchamp	Somerset	50.94°N 02.85°W	ST4017
Shepton Mallet	Somerset	51.18°N 02.55°W	ST6143
Shepton Montague	Somerset	51.07°N 02.47°W	ST6731
Shepway	Kent	51.24°N 00.53°E	TQ7753
Sheraton	Durham	54.70°N 01.31°W	NZ4435
Sherberton	Devon	50.54°N 03.92°W	SX6473
Sherborne	Dorset	50.94°N 02.52°W	ST6316
Sherborne	Gloucestershire	51.82°N 01.75°W	SP1714
Sherborne	Bath and North East Somerset	51.29°N 02.60°W	ST5855
Sherborne St John	Hampshire	51.29°N 01.11°W	SU6255
Sherbourne	Warwickshire	52.25°N 01.62°W	SP2662
Sherbourne Street	Suffolk	52.03°N 00.84°E	TL9541
Sherburn	Durham	54.77°N 01.51°W	NZ3142
Sherburn	North Yorkshire	54.18°N 00.54°W	SE9577
Sherburn Grange	Durham	54.77°N 01.53°W	NZ3042
Sherburn Hill	Durham	54.77°N 01.48°W	NZ3342
Sherburn in Elmet	North Yorkshire	53.79°N 01.25°W	SE4933
Shere	Surrey	51.21°N 00.46°W	TQ0747
Shereford	Norfolk	52.82°N 00.78°E	TF8829
Sherfield English	Hampshire	50.99°N 01.58°W	SU2922
Sherfield on Loddon	Hampshire	51.30°N 01.04°W	SU6757
Sherfin	Lancashire	53.72°N 02.33°W	SD7825
Sherford	Somerset	51.00°N 03.11°W	ST2223
Sherford	Dorset	50.73°N 02.12°W	SY9193
Sherford	Devon	50.28°N 03.72°W	SX7744
Sheriff Hill	Gateshead	54.93°N 01.59°W	NZ2660
Sheriff Hutton	North Yorkshire	54.08°N 01.00°W	SE6566
Sheriffs Lench	Worcestershire	52.13°N 01.98°W	SP0149
Sheringham	Norfolk	52.94°N 01.19°E	TG1543
Sherington	Milton Keynes	52.10°N 00.71°W	SP8846
Sheringwood	Norfolk	52.92°N 01.21°E	TG1641
Shermanbury	West Sussex	50.95°N 00.29°W	TQ2019
Shernal Green	Worcestershire	52.24°N 02.13°W	SO9161
Shernborne	Norfolk	52.85°N 00.53°E	TF7132
Sherrard's Green	Worcestershire	52.11°N 02.30°W	SO7946
Sherrardspark	Hertfordshire	51.80°N 00.21°W	TL2313
Sheriffhales	Shropshire	52.70°N 02.37°W	SJ7512
Sherrington	Wiltshire	51.15°N 02.05°W	ST9639
Sherston	Wiltshire	51.56°N 02.21°W	ST8585
Sherwood	Nottinghamshire	52.98°N 01.15°W	SK5743
Sherwood Green	Devon	50.96°N 04.06°W	SS5520
Sherwood Park	Kent	51.13°N 00.28°E	TQ6040
Shettleston	City of Glasgow	55.84°N 04.17°W	NS6463
Shevington	Wigan	53.56°N 02.69°W	SD5408
Shevington Moor	Wigan	53.58°N 02.69°W	SD5410
Shevington Vale	Wigan	53.57°N 02.71°W	SD5309
Sheviock	Cornwall	50.37°N 04.29°W	SX3755
Shewalton	North Ayrshire	55.58°N 04.65°W	NS3336

=== Shi ===
Location	Locality	Coordinates (links to map & photo sources)	OS grid reference
Shiant Islands	Western Isles	57.89°N 06.36°W	NG413982
Shibden Head	Bradford	53.75°N 01.86°W	SE0929
Shide	Isle of Wight	50.68°N 01.29°W	SZ5088
Shiel Bridge	Highland	57.20°N 05.42°W	NG9318
Shieldaig (Strathcarron)	Highland	57.51°N 05.65°W	NG8153
Shieldaig (Wester Ross)	Highland	57.68°N 05.69°W	NG8072
Shieldhall	City of Glasgow	55.85°N 04.35°W	NS5365
Shieldhill	South Lanarkshire	55.64°N 03.59°W	NT0040
Shieldhill	Falkirk	55.96°N 03.77°W	NS8976
Shield Row	Durham	54.87°N 01.68°W	NZ2053
Shielfoot	Highland	56.76°N 05.83°W	NM6670
Shierglas	Perth and Kinross	56.75°N 03.83°W	NN8864
Shifnal	Shropshire	52.66°N 02.38°W	SJ7407
Shilbottle	Northumberland	55.36°N 01.70°W	NU1908
Shilbottle Grange	Northumberland	55.36°N 01.68°W	NU2008
Shildon	Durham	54.62°N 01.64°W	NZ2326
Shillay (near Pabbay)	Western Isles	57.80°N 07.25°W	NF881911
Shillay (Monach Islands)	Western Isles	57.52°N 07.69°W	NF593626
Shillay Mor	Western Isles	57.32°N 07.24°W	NF847383
Shillford	East Renfrewshire	55.77°N 04.48°W	NS4456
Shillingford	Devon	50.99°N 03.45°W	SS9823
Shillingford	Oxfordshire	51.62°N 01.14°W	SU5992
Shillingford Abbot	Devon	50.68°N 03.55°W	SX9088
Shillingford St George	Devon	50.67°N 03.55°W	SX9087
Shillingstone	Dorset	50.89°N 02.25°W	ST8211
Shillington	Bedfordshire	51.99°N 00.37°W	TL1234
Shillmoor	Northumberland	55.35°N 02.19°W	NT8807
Shilton	Warwickshire	52.45°N 01.41°W	SP4084
Shilton	Oxfordshire	51.77°N 01.62°W	SP2608
Shilvington	Northumberland	55.12°N 01.76°W	NZ1581
Shimpling	Norfolk	52.40°N 01.15°E	TM1583
Shimpling	Suffolk	52.12°N 00.71°E	TL8651
Shimpling Street	Suffolk	52.13°N 00.73°E	TL8752
Shin	Highland	57.98°N 04.41°W	NC574023
Shincliffe	Durham	54.75°N 01.55°W	NZ2940
Shiney Row	Sunderland	54.86°N 01.50°W	NZ3252
Shinfield	Berkshire	51.40°N 00.95°W	SU7368
Shingay	Cambridgeshire	52.09°N 00.10°W	TL3046
Shingham	Norfolk	52.61°N 00.59°E	TF7605
Shingle Street	Suffolk	52.02°N 01.43°E	TM3642
Shinner's Bridge	Devon	50.44°N 03.71°W	SX7862
Shipbourne	Kent	51.24°N 00.27°E	TQ5952
Shipdham	Norfolk	52.62°N 00.87°E	TF9507
Shipham	Somerset	51.30°N 02.80°W	ST4457
Shiphay	Devon	50.47°N 03.56°W	SX8965
Shiplake	Oxfordshire	51.49°N 00.90°W	SU7678
Shiplake Bottom	Oxfordshire	51.51°N 00.99°W	SU7080
Shiplake Row	Oxfordshire	51.49°N 00.92°W	SU7578
Shiplate	Somerset	51.29°N 02.93°W	ST3556
Shiplaw	Scottish Borders	55.72°N 03.22°W	NT2349
Shipley	West Sussex	50.97°N 00.37°W	TQ1421
Shipley	Shropshire	52.55°N 02.29°W	SO8095
Shipley	Bradford	53.82°N 01.78°W	SE1437
Shipley	Derbyshire	53.00°N 01.34°W	SK4445
Shipley Bridge	West Sussex	51.14°N 00.14°W	TQ3040
Shipley Common	Derbyshire	52.98°N 01.33°W	SK4543
Shipley Gate	Derbyshire	53.00°N 01.31°W	SK4645
Shipmeadow	Suffolk	52.45°N 01.50°E	TM3890
Shipping	Pembrokeshire	51.73°N 04.73°W	SN1108
Shippon	Oxfordshire	51.67°N 01.30°W	SU4898
Shipston-on-Stour	Warwickshire	52.05°N 01.63°W	SP2540
Shipton	Shropshire	52.51°N 02.64°W	SO5691
Shipton	Gloucestershire	51.86°N 01.95°W	SP0318
Shipton	Buckinghamshire	51.93°N 00.88°W	SP7727
Shipton	North Yorkshire	54.01°N 01.16°W	SE5558
Shipton Bellinger	Hampshire	51.20°N 01.67°W	SU2345
Shipton Gorge	Dorset	50.71°N 02.72°W	SY4991
Shipton Green	West Sussex	50.78°N 00.86°W	SZ8099
Shipton Lee	Buckinghamshire	51.88°N 00.94°W	SP7321
Shipton Moyne	Gloucestershire	51.59°N 02.16°W	ST8989
Shipton Oliffe	Gloucestershire	51.86°N 01.95°W	SP0318
Shipton-on-Cherwell	Oxfordshire	51.84°N 01.30°W	SP4816
Shipton Solers	Gloucestershire	51.86°N 01.95°W	SP0318
Shiptonthorpe	East Riding of Yorkshire	53.87°N 00.70°W	SE8543
Shipton-under-Wychwood	Oxfordshire	51.85°N 01.60°W	SP2717
Shirburn	Oxfordshire	51.64°N 01.00°W	SU6995
Shirdley Hill	Lancashire	53.60°N 02.98°W	SD3512
Shirebrook	Derbyshire	53.19°N 01.22°W	SK5267
Shirecliffe	Sheffield	53.40°N 01.48°W	SK3490
Shiregreen	Sheffield	53.42°N 01.45°W	SK3692
Shirehampton	City of Bristol	51.49°N 02.67°W	ST5377
Shiremoor	North Tyneside	55.03°N 01.51°W	NZ3171
Shirenewton	Monmouthshire	51.63°N 02.76°W	ST4793
Shire Oak	Walsall	52.63°N 01.92°W	SK0504
Shireoaks	Nottinghamshire	53.31°N 01.17°W	SK5580
Shireoaks	Derbyshire	53.34°N 01.89°W	SK0783
Shires Mill	Fife	56.06°N 03.60°W	NT0087
Shirkoak	Kent	51.09°N 00.76°E	TQ9436
Shirland	Derbyshire	53.11°N 01.41°W	SK3958
Shirlett	Shropshire	52.57°N 02.50°W	SO6697
Shirley	City of Southampton	50.91°N 01.43°W	SU4013
Shirley (New Forest)	Hampshire	50.78°N 01.76°W	SZ1798
Shirley	Solihull	52.40°N 01.82°W	SP1279
Shirley	Croydon	51.37°N 00.06°W	TQ3566
Shirley	Derbyshire	52.96°N 01.68°W	SK2141
Shirley Heath	Solihull	52.39°N 01.83°W	SP1177
Shirley Holms	Hampshire	50.78°N 01.57°W	SZ3098
Shirley Warren	City of Southampton	50.92°N 01.44°W	SU3914
Shirl Heath	Herefordshire	52.22°N 02.83°W	SO4359
Shirrell Heath	Hampshire	50.92°N 01.19°W	SU5714
Shirwell	Devon	51.11°N 04.01°W	SS5937
Shiskine	North Ayrshire	55.51°N 05.31°W	NR9129
Shitterton	Dorset	50.74°N 02.22°W	SY8494

=== Sho ===
Location	Locality	Coordinates (links to map & photo sources)	OS grid reference
Shobdon	Herefordshire	52.24°N 02.89°W	SO3961
Shobley	Hampshire	50.85°N 01.74°W	SU1806
Shobnall	Staffordshire	52.80°N 01.66°W	SK2323
Shobrooke	Devon	50.78°N 03.61°W	SS8600
Shoby	Leicestershire	52.77°N 00.99°W	SK6820
Shocklach	Cheshire	53.03°N 02.85°W	SJ4349
Shocklach Green	Cheshire	53.03°N 02.85°W	SJ4349
Shoeburyness	Essex	51.52°N 00.78°E	TQ9384
Shoebury Ness	Essex	51.52°N 00.78°E	TQ934841
Sholden	Kent	51.21°N 01.36°E	TR3552
Sholing	City of Southampton	50.89°N 01.36°W	SU4511
Sholing Common	City of Southampton	50.90°N 01.36°W	SU4512
Sholver	Oldham	53.56°N 02.07°W	SD9507
Shootash	Hampshire	50.99°N 01.54°W	SU3222
Shooters Hill	Greenwich	51.46°N 00.05°E	TQ4376
Shootersway	Hertfordshire	51.75°N 00.59°W	SP9707
Shoot Hill	Shropshire	52.70°N 02.87°W	SJ4112
Shop	Cornwall	50.89°N 04.53°W	SS2214
Shop	Devon	50.87°N 04.29°W	SS3911
Shop	St Austell, Cornwall	50.51°N 04.99°W	SW8873
Shop Corner	Suffolk	51.96°N 01.20°E	TM2034
Shopford	Cumbria	55.05°N 02.69°W	NY5674
Shopnoller	Somerset	51.08°N 03.20°W	ST1632
Shopp Hill	West Sussex	51.04°N 00.67°W	SU9328
Shopwyke	West Sussex	50.83°N 00.75°W	SU8805
Shore	Calderdale	53.73°N 02.13°W	SD9126
Shore	Rochdale	53.64°N 02.12°W	SD9216
Shore Bottom	Devon	50.82°N 03.09°W	ST2303
Shoreditch	Somerset	50.99°N 03.08°W	ST2422
Shoreditch	Islington	51.52°N 00.09°W	TQ3282
Shoregill	Cumbria	54.40°N 02.35°W	NY7701
Shoreham	Kent	51.32°N 00.16°E	TQ5161
Shoreham Beach	West Sussex	50.82°N 00.26°W	TQ2204
Shoreham-by-Sea	West Sussex	50.81°N 00.26°W	TQ2203
Shoresdean	Northumberland	55.70°N 02.08°W	NT9546
Shores Green	Oxfordshire	51.77°N 01.46°W	SP3709
Shorley	Hampshire	51.03°N 01.18°W	SU5726
Shorncliffe Camp	Kent	51.07°N 01.12°E	TR1935
Shorncote	Gloucestershire	51.66°N 01.97°W	SU0296
Shorne	Kent	51.41°N 00.42°E	TQ6971
Shorne Ridgeway	Kent	51.40°N 00.42°E	TQ6970
Shortacombe	Devon	50.65°N 04.09°W	SX5286
Shortacross	Cornwall	50.38°N 04.40°W	SX2957
Shortbridge	East Sussex	50.97°N 00.06°E	TQ4521
Short Cross	Dudley	52.45°N 02.06°W	SO9684
Shortfield Common	Surrey	51.17°N 00.79°W	SU8442
Shortgate	East Sussex	50.91°N 00.11°E	TQ4915
Short Green	Norfolk	52.43°N 01.07°E	TM0986
Shorthampton	Oxfordshire	51.87°N 01.53°W	SP3220
Shortheath	Hampshire	51.11°N 00.90°W	SU7736
Shortheath	Surrey	51.18°N 00.81°W	SU8344
Short Heath	Birmingham	52.52°N 01.86°W	SP0992
Short Heath	Walsall	52.59°N 02.04°W	SJ9700
Short Heath	Derbyshire	52.72°N 01.55°W	SK3014
Shorthill	Shropshire	52.66°N 02.85°W	SJ4208
Shortlands	Bromley	51.39°N 00.00°E	TQ3968
Shortlanesend	Cornwall	50.28°N 05.08°W	SW8047
Shortlees	East Ayrshire	55.58°N 04.50°W	NS4235
Shortmoor	Devon	50.83°N 03.10°W	ST2204
Shortmoor	Dorset	50.80°N 02.73°W	ST4801
Shorton	Devon	50.44°N 03.57°W	SX8862
Shortroods	Renfrewshire	55.85°N 04.44°W	NS4765
Shortstanding	Gloucestershire	51.81°N 02.62°W	SO5713
Shortstown	Bedfordshire	52.10°N 00.43°W	TL0746
Short Street	Wiltshire	51.23°N 02.24°W	ST8348
Shortwood	Gloucestershire	51.68°N 02.23°W	ST8499
Shortwood	South Gloucestershire	51.47°N 02.47°W	ST6775
Shorwell	Isle of Wight	50.63°N 01.36°W	SZ4582
Shoscombe	Bath and North East Somerset	51.30°N 02.41°W	ST7156
Shoscombe Vale	Bath and North East Somerset	51.30°N 02.41°W	ST7156
Shotatton	Shropshire	52.79°N 02.95°W	SJ3622
Shotesham	Norfolk	52.54°N 01.31°E	TM2599
Shotgate	Essex	51.59°N 00.54°E	TQ7692
Shotley	Northamptonshire	52.56°N 00.64°W	SP9297
Shotley	Suffolk	51.96°N 01.24°E	TM2335
Shotley Bridge	County Durham	54.86°N 01.87°W	NZ0852
Shotleyfield	Northumberland	54.87°N 01.90°W	NZ0653
Shotley Gate	Suffolk	51.95°N 01.25°E	TM2433
Shottenden	Kent	51.24°N 00.92°E	TR0454
Shottermill	Surrey	51.08°N 00.74°W	SU8832
Shottery	Warwickshire	52.18°N 01.73°W	SP1854
Shotteswell	Warwickshire	52.10°N 01.38°W	SP4245
Shottisham	Suffolk	52.04°N 01.36°E	TM3144
Shottle	Derbyshire	53.03°N 01.53°W	SK3149
Shottlegate	Derbyshire	53.01°N 01.52°W	SK3247
Shotton (Peterlee)	Durham	54.74°N 01.36°W	NZ4139
Shotton (Sedgefield)	Durham	54.61°N 01.44°W	NZ3625
Shotton	Northumberland	55.09°N 01.65°W	NZ2278
Shotton	Flintshire	53.20°N 03.04°W	SJ3068
Shotton Colliery	Durham	54.75°N 01.39°W	NZ3940
Shotts	North Lanarkshire	55.82°N 03.80°W	NS8760
Shotwick	Cheshire	53.23°N 03.00°W	SJ3371
Shouldham	Norfolk	52.64°N 00.46°E	TF6708
Shouldham Thorpe	Norfolk	52.64°N 00.45°E	TF6608
Shoulton	Worcestershire	52.22°N 02.27°W	SO8158
Shover's Green	East Sussex	51.04°N 00.35°E	TQ6530

=== Shr ===
Location	Locality	Coordinates (links to map & photo sources)	OS grid reference
Shraleybrook	Staffordshire	53.03°N 02.32°W	SJ7849
Shrawardine	Shropshire	52.72°N 02.90°W	SJ3915
Shrawley	Worcestershire	52.27°N 02.29°W	SO8064
Shreding Green	Buckinghamshire	51.51°N 00.53°W	TQ0281
Shrewley	Warwickshire	52.30°N 01.67°W	SP2267
Shrewley Common	Warwickshire	52.30°N 01.69°W	SP2167
Shrewsbury	Shropshire	52.70°N 02.75°W	SJ4912
Shrewton	Wiltshire	51.18°N 01.91°W	SU0643
Shripney	West Sussex	50.81°N 00.68°W	SU9302
Shrivenham	Oxfordshire	51.59°N 01.65°W	SU2489
Shropham	Norfolk	52.49°N 00.91°E	TL9893
Shroton or Iwerne Courtney	Dorset	50.90°N 02.21°W	ST8512
Shrub End	Essex	51.87°N 00.86°E	TL9723
Shrubs Hill	Berkshire	51.39°N 00.62°W	SU9667

=== Shu-Shw ===
Location	Locality	Coordinates (links to map & photo sources)	OS grid reference
Shucknall	Herefordshire	52.07°N 02.61°W	SO5842
Shudy Camps	Cambridgeshire	52.07°N 00.34°E	TL6144
Shulishadermor	Highland	57.40°N 06.21°W	NG4743
Shulista	Highland	57.68°N 06.33°W	NG4274
Shuna (Slate Islands)	Argyll and Bute	56.21°N 05.60°W	NM767078
Shuna Island	Argyll and Bute	56.58°N 05.39°W	NM917485
Shurdington	Gloucestershire	51.86°N 02.11°W	SO9218
Shurlock Row	Berkshire	51.45°N 00.80°W	SU8374
Shurnock	Worcestershire	52.23°N 01.97°W	SP0260
Shurton	Somerset	51.18°N 03.14°W	ST2044
Shustoke	Warwickshire	52.50°N 01.67°W	SP2290
Shute (East Devon)	Devon	50.76°N 03.06°W	SY2597
Shute (Mid Devon)	Devon	50.78°N 03.57°W	SS8900
Shute End	Wiltshire	51.05°N 01.75°W	SU1728
Shutford	Oxfordshire	52.05°N 01.44°W	SP3840
Shut Heath	Staffordshire	52.78°N 02.20°W	SJ8621
Shuthonger	Gloucestershire	52.01°N 02.17°W	SO8835
Shutlanger	Northamptonshire	52.13°N 00.94°W	SP7249
Shutta	Cornwall	50.35°N 04.46°W	SX2553
Shutt Green	Staffordshire	52.67°N 02.19°W	SJ8709
Shuttington	Warwickshire	52.64°N 01.63°W	SK2505
Shuttlesfield	Kent	51.12°N 01.11°E	TR1841
Shuttlewood	Derbyshire	53.24°N 01.31°W	SK4672
Shuttleworth	Bury	53.64°N 02.30°W	SD8017
Shutton	Herefordshire	51.92°N 02.51°W	SO6525
Shwt	Bridgend	51.56°N 03.60°W	SS8986
