= Shotton =

Shotton may refer to:

== Places ==
=== England ===
- Shotton, Sedgefield, a village in County Durham, north west of Stockon-on-Tees
- Shotton, Stannington, a hamlet in the village of Stannington and the county of Northumberland
- Shotton Colliery, a village in County Durham, west of Peterlee
- Old Shotton, a village in Peterlee, County Durham
- Shotton (parish), a civil parish in County Durham, west of Peterlee
- Shotton, site of medieval village, in Kilham, Northumberland, England

=== Wales ===
- Shotton, Flintshire, a community in the county of Flintshire, which is served by
  - Shotton railway station

== Other uses ==
- Shotton (surname)
