= Wellfield railway station =

Former railway station in Wingate, County Durham, England

Wellfield
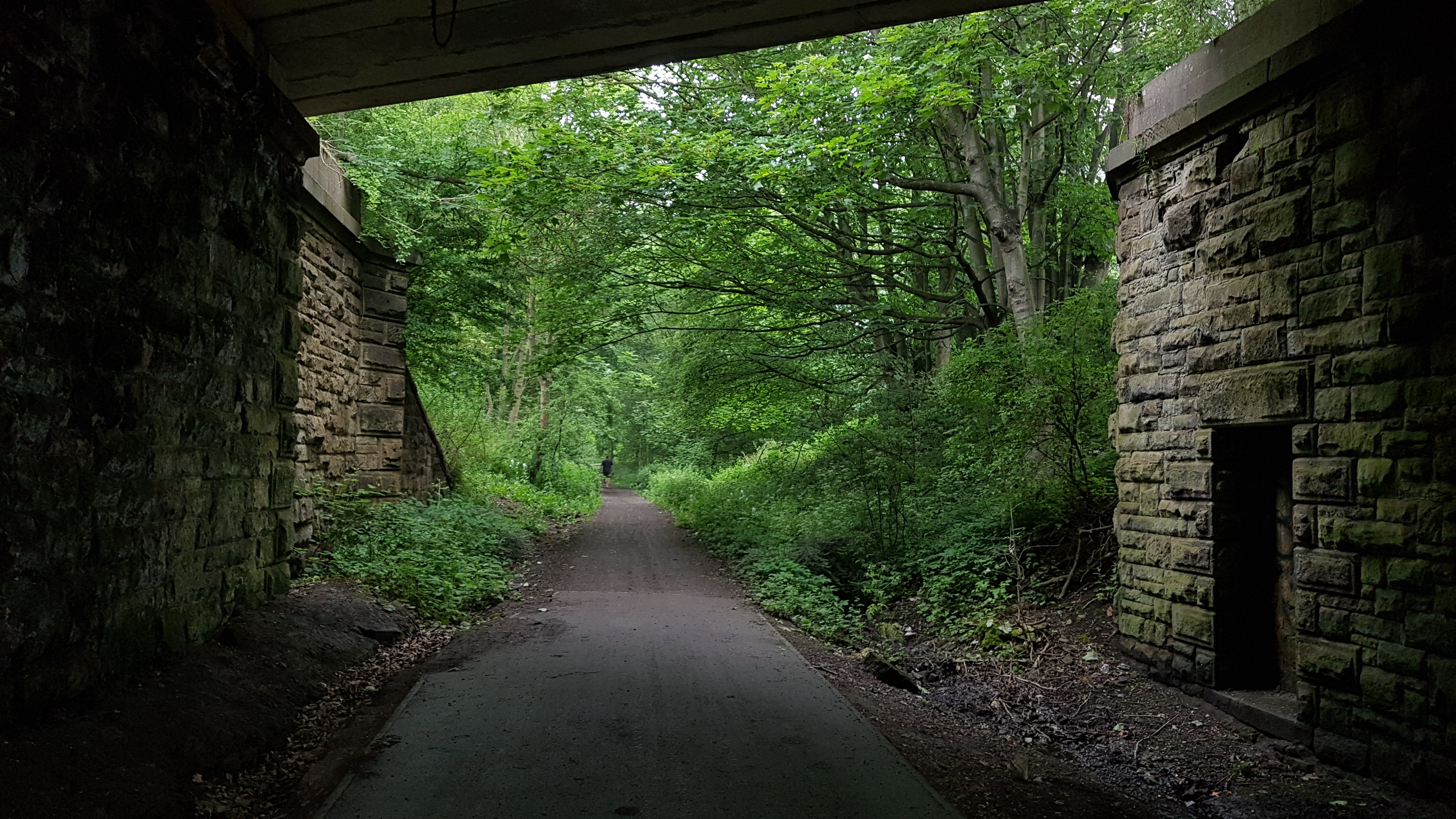
- The site of the station in June 2020

General information
- Location: Wingate, County Durham; England
- Coordinates: 54.7382°N 1.3716°W
- Grid reference: NZ405383
- Platforms: 2

Other information
- Status: Disused

History
- Original company: North Eastern Railway
- Pre-grouping: North Eastern Railway
- Post-grouping: LNER; British Railways (North Eastern)

Key dates
- 1882: Opened
- 2 November 1931: Passenger services to Stockton withdrawn
- 9 June 1952: Closed
Location

Wellfield railway station was a railway station that served the village of Wingate in County Durham, England. It was built by the North Eastern Railway (NER) on the route of the Hartlepool Dock and Railway (HD&R) to allow interchange between the existing line and their newly opened line from Stockton-on-Tees.

== History ==
=== The Hartlepool Dock and Railway ===
Construction of the HD&R was first authorised by the Hartlepool Dock and Railway Act 1832 (2 & 3 Will. 4. c. lxvii) obtained on 1 June 1832 which granted the railway company powers to construct a 14-mile railway from Moorsley (near Houghton-le-Spring) to Hartlepool as well as a number of short branches to serve collieries surrounding the line and the Hartlepool Dock and Railway (Durham Branch) Act 1834 (4 & 5 Will. 4. c. lvi) of 16 June 1834 authorised an additional branch to Gilesgate in the City of Durham. However competition from other railway companies – most notably the Durham and Sunderland Railway (D&SR) – diverted much of the traffic that the company had been intending to access along other routes thus meaning that the HD&R only reached as far as Haswell and most of its branches were either cut short or left unbuilt. Nonetheless, the curtailed line opened (as far as Haswell) on 23 November 1835. Passenger services were operated over the line but no station was initially provided at Wellfield: the two nearest stations at the time were Thornley, to the north, and Castle Eden, to the south east.

In 1846, the newly formed York and Newcastle Railway (Y&NR) took out a lease on the HD&R which was ratified by the York, Newcastle, and Berwick Railway (Hartlepool Dock and Railway, &c. Leasing) Act 1848 (11 & 12 Vict. c. lxxxi) of 22 July 1848, from which point the line was operated by the York, Newcastle and Berwick Railway (YN&BR) (the successor to the Y&NR). On the 31 July 1854, the YN&BR was amalgamated with other companies to form the North Eastern Railway.

The NER made several improvements to line during the 1870s, including the opening of a chord in 1877 that allowed passenger trains to continue beyond Haswell to Sunderland by continuing onto the route of the D&SR. One of the most significant of these improvements involved the realignment of the 1 in 34 incline at Hesleden Bank, in 1874, to allow locomotives to replace rope haulage on this stretch of the line, though it still remained problematic for trains using the line.

=== The NER Castle Eden Branch Line and the opening of the station ===
In 1872, the NER gained powers in the North Eastern Railway Act 1872 (35 & 36 Vict. c. cxli) to construct a line from Bowesfield Junction (where it joined the route of Stockton and Darlington Railway) to Wellfield Junction (on the route of the HD&R, just to the south of the future Wellfield station) (known as the Castle Eden Branch Line) and opened the line in stages, with the section north of Carlton Junction (where the line crossed the route of the Clarence Railway) opening to freight traffic on 1 August 1878. This new line provided an alternative route from Teesside to the north, bypassing Hesleden Bank. Local passenger trains were eventually introduced on 1 March 1880, utilising the former Clarence Railway route from Stockton-on-Tees station to reach Carlton Junction before taking the new line to Wellfield Junction and initially continued over the route of the HD&R to Thornley station. Two years later Wellfield station was opened, a short distance to the north of the junction, primarily as an interchange station to allow passengers from the line to Stockton to connect with trains to Sunderland and Hartlepool.

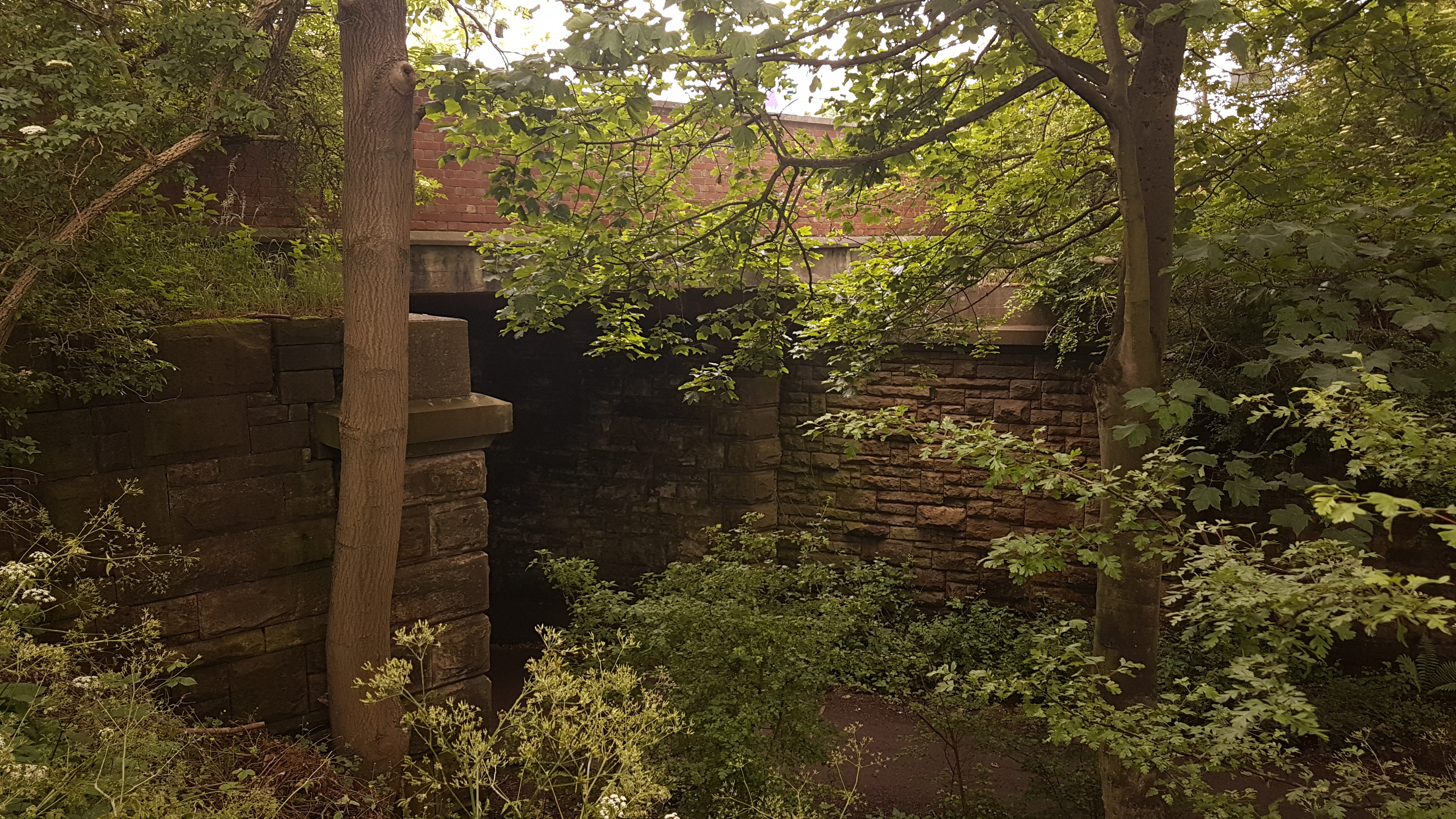
The station booking office was located on the now exposed area of the bridge abutment tops, the bridge having been widened to enable the road and booking office to both sit on top of it

The station had two platforms, each with a wooden waiting room and a ticket office built over the tracks alongside the road bridge. Unlike other contemporary stations that were built on the Castle Eden Branch, the station never had any goods facilities. A signal box had been built on the east side of the tracks, just south of the road bridge, when the Castle Eden Branch first opened in 1877. Originally called Castle Eden North Junction, it was renamed Wellfield when the station opened and, in 1910, was replaced by a new signal box at the northern end of the southbound (eastern) platform. The signal box was unusual in that it overhung the platform (due to the restricted width of the site) but it outlived the station, not closing until 1979.

Passenger traffic on the Castle Eden Branch was always light, the line having been built primarily to allow freight to bypass the congested lines through Stockton and Hartlepool. Even so, there were four stopping passenger trains over the line per day in each direction in 1910 and the number increased to five each way by the 1930s. Despite this low usage Wellfield, being located close to two large villages and being served by trains on two lines, was fairly well used; in 1911 there were 37,551 tickets issued at the station.

=== Decline and closure ===
As part of the 1923 grouping, the NER became part of the London and North Eastern Railway (LNER). Passenger traffic on the Castle Eden Branch remained low and consequentially, the LNER withdrew stopping passenger trains on 2 November 1931 though it continued to be used by some express passenger trains for a number of years. After the Second World War, the northbound track of this line was, on several occasions, used to store surplus wagons, making it only passable to southbound trains. Stopping goods trains were withdrawn on 2 April 1951 and the few remaining through trains to use the line ceased to do so from 6 July 1966 when it was closed as a through route.

The ex-HD&R line survived longer; the line came under control of the North Eastern Region of British Railways after the LNER was nationalised in 1948. By this time, passenger and goods traffic across the country was in decline and this was also the case for the route from West Hartlepool to Sunderland through Wellfield, which lost its passenger services (south of Murton) on 9 June 1952. Nonetheless, stopping goods trains continued to call at many other stations on the line until 1966 and Sunday express-passenger train diversions continued to pass through until the section through Haswell was dismantled in the late 1960s. Indeed, a single line was maintained through the station site to provide a southerly outlet for coal from South Hetton and Hawthorn Collieries until around the time of the 1984 miner's strike.

After the Castle Eden Branch Line was closed and the tracks lifted, it was purchased by the two local authorities whose areas it passed through, meaning that the line north of Wynyard) came under the control of Durham County Council who converted it into the Castle Eden Walkway cycle path. Once the tracks were lifted on the ex-HD&R route work commenced on converting the disused section (south of Haswell) into the Hart to Haswell Walkway which was linked into the Castle Eden Walkway to form a continuous north–south cycleway. This was eventually extended to Ryhope after the closure of the remaining section of the line between Murton Colliery and Ryhope Junction in 1991.

Preceding station	Historical railways	Following station
Castle Eden; Line and station closed	North Eastern Railway; Hartlepool Dock & Railway	Thornley; Line and station closed
Hurworth Burn; Line and station closed	North Eastern Railway; Castle Eden Railway	Terminus
