= Shotton Bridge railway station =

Former railway station in England

Shotton Bridge
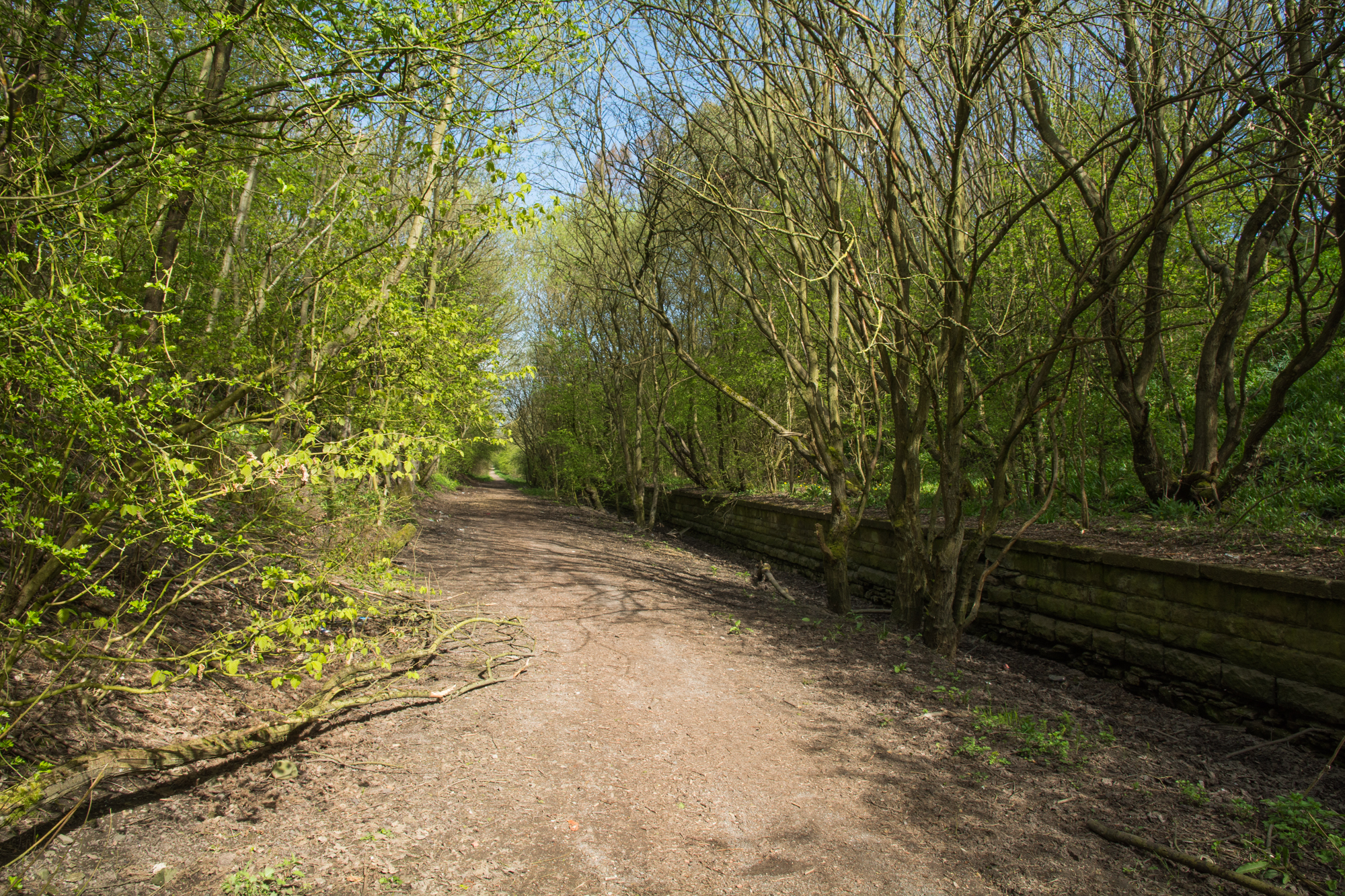
- The site of the station in May 2018. The road over-bridge is behind the photographer.

General information
- Location: Shotton Colliery, County Durham; England
- Coordinates: 54.7649°N 1.3939°W
- Grid reference: NZ39084128
- Platforms: 2

Other information
- Status: Disused

History
- Original company: North Eastern Railway
- Pre-grouping: North Eastern Railway
- Post-grouping: LNER; British Railways (North Eastern)

Key dates
- 1877: Opened
- 9 June 1952: Closed
Location

Shotton Bridge railway station was a railway station built by the North Eastern Railway (NER) on the route of the Hartlepool Dock and Railway (HD&R) as part of a programme of works to modernise that line and link it with the Durham and Sunderland Railway (D&SR) so as to create a railway through-route between West Hartlepool and Sunderland. On opening, the station served the relatively new village of Shotton Colliery, which grew around the nearby Shotton Grange Colliery, as well as Old Shotton on the Stockton to Sunderland turnpike road, further to the east.

== History ==
=== The Hartlepool Dock and Railway ===
Construction of the HD&R was first authorised by the Hartlepool Dock and Railway Act 1832 (2 & 3 Will. 4. c. lxvii) obtained on 1 June 1832 which granted the railway company powers to construct a 14-mile railway from Moorsley (near Houghton-le-Spring) to Hartlepool, as well as a number of short branches to serve collieries surrounding the line. A further Act of 16 June 1834 authorised an additional branch to Gilesgate in the City of Durham. However competition from other railway companies (most notably the Durham and Sunderland Railway) diverted along other routes much of the traffic that the company had been intending to access thus meaning that the H&DR only reached as far as Haswell and most of its branches were either cut short or left unbuilt. Nonetheless, the curtailed line opened (as far as Haswell) on 23 November 1835. Passenger services were operated over the line but no station was initially provided at Shotton: the nearest station at the time was Thornley.

The most likely reason that no station was provided here when the line first opened in 1835 is that the area was then rural: the line passed some distance from Old Shotton and the fairly deep Permian Magnesian Limestone overlying Carboniferous Coal Measures meant that large-scale mining activity had yet to begin in the area. Sinking of Shotton Grange Colliery began in 1840 and once in production it was linked first to the southbound H&DR route by the Shotton Wagonway and soon afterwards, in 1841, to the northbound Pesspool Branch of the South Hetton Railway.

=== The NER and the opening of the station ===
In 1846, the newly formed York and Newcastle Railway (Y&NR) took out a lease on the HD&R which was ratified by an act of Parliament of 22 July 1848, from which point the line was operated by the York, Newcastle and Berwick Railway (YN&BR) (the successor to the Y&NR). On the 31 July 1854, the YN&BR was amalgamated with other companies to form the North Eastern Railway.

The NER initiated a programme of improvements to ex-HD&R and ex-D&SR lines during the 1870s: in 1874, the tracks up the original 1 in 34 rope-worked incline at Hesleden Bank were realigned to ease the gradients and enable locomotive working and, in 1877, a chord was built at Haswell to allow through passenger trains to run between the ex-HD&R and ex-D&SR networks, creating a direct route between West Hartlepool and Sunderland. By this time, the new village of Shotton Colliery (referred to as New Shotton on early OS maps) had developed to provide housing for the colliery workers and so, as part of these improvement works, in 1877 the NER opened a station at Shotton Bridge to serve the new community.

The station offices were located on a widened road bridge over the tracks and were linked to the two platforms by covered stairways. Each platform had a brick waiting room. Unlike other contemporary stations of the NER, the station never had any goods facilities, perhaps due to the colliery being served by its own wagonway branch.

However, in the year that the station was opened, Shotton Grange Colliery and its waggonway closed (the limited technology of the time was unable to extract coal economically from the depths at which it was present) meaning that the village lost its main source of employment. Thus, in 1894 it was reported that many of the village's workmen's houses were abandoned. In 1901 the station served a population of 959 within the immediate vicinity but the reopening of the colliery (and the southern section of the wagonway) later that year was one cause of the increase to 6,280 in 1911.

=== Decline and closure ===
Despite the improvements of the 1870s, the route through Shotton Bridge continued to provide a steep and indirect route between West Hartlepool and Sunderland and so, on 1 April 1905, the NER opened a new coastal line linking the former Londonderry (Seaham to Sunderland) Railway at Seaham with the ex-HD&R line near the coast at Hart. The new line allowed the steepest sections of the inland route to be bypassed and thus led to the gradual diversion of much of the longer-distance traffic away from Shotton Bridge station and onto the new line.

The NER became part of the London and North Eastern Railway (LNER) as part of the 1923 grouping, which in turn came under the control of the North Eastern Region of British Railways following its nationalisation in 1948. By this time, passenger and goods traffic across the country was in decline and this was also the case for the route from West Hartlepool to Sunderland through Shotton Bridge. The route lost its stopping passenger services (south of Murton) on 9 June 1952 and though many of the stations on the line remained open to goods traffic until 1966, the lack of goods handling facilities meant that Shotton Bridge station closed completely when passenger services ceased. The line was, however, still used by Sunday diversions until the section through Haswell was dismantled in the late 1960s and a single line through the station was maintained to provide a southerly outlet for coal from South Hetton and Hawthorn Collieries until around the time of the 1984 miner's strike. Shotton Grange Colliery continued to be served by the remaining section of waggonway until its closure in 1972.

Shortly before the station's closure, the new town of Peterlee was established in 1948 and was to be located a short distance to the east of Shotton Colliery. However, by the time construction of the town had actually commenced, the station had already closed.

Once the remaining tracks were lifted on the line, work commenced on converting the disused section (south of Haswell) into the Hart to Haswell Walkway which was linked into the Castle Eden Walkway to form a continuous north–south cycleway. This was eventually extended to Ryhope after the closure of the remaining section of the line between Hawthorn Colliery and Ryhope Junction in 1991.

Preceding station	Historical railways	Following station
Thornley; Line and station closed	North Eastern Railway; Hartlepool Dock & Railway	Haswell; Line and station closed
