= Luke Greenwood =

English cricketer (1834–1909)

Luke Greenwood (13 July 1834 – 1 November 1909) was an English first-class cricketer, who played 48 matches for Sheffield and Yorkshire from 1861 to 1874.

Born in Cowmes, Huddersfield, Yorkshire, Greenwood was a useful player verging on all-rounder, who also played for Yorkshire with Stockton-on-Tees (1861), the North of England (1863-1864), the United England Eleven (1865), the Players (1865-1866), England (1867), North of the Thames (1868) and the United North of England Eleven (1870-1875), appearing in sixty nine matches all together. A right-handed lower order batsman, he scored 1,244 runs at 11.96, with a best of 83 against Surrey.

A right arm fast round arm bowler, he took 113 wickets at 18.28, with a best of 8 for 35 against Cambridgeshire. He also took 6 for 43 against Surrey in the County Championship.

Greenwood turned to umpiring even before his playing career was finished. He umpired forty six first-class matches between 1862 and 1886. With Bob Thoms, he officiated in one Test match, at The Oval between England and Australia in August 1882. It was after Australia won this match by seven runs that The Sporting Times wrote an obituary for English cricket, and bails were burned and put in an urn to create 'The Ashes'. He was no stranger to the Australian side, umpiring thirty two first-class matches involving Australian teams on their tours of 1880, 1882, 1884 and 1886.

His nephew, Andrew Greenwood, played for Yorkshire and appeared in two Test Matches in 1876/77. His son-in-law, William Shotton, appeared in two matches for Yorkshire County Cricket Club.

Greenwood died in November 1909, in Morley, Leeds, Yorkshire.
