= Veteran Bandit =

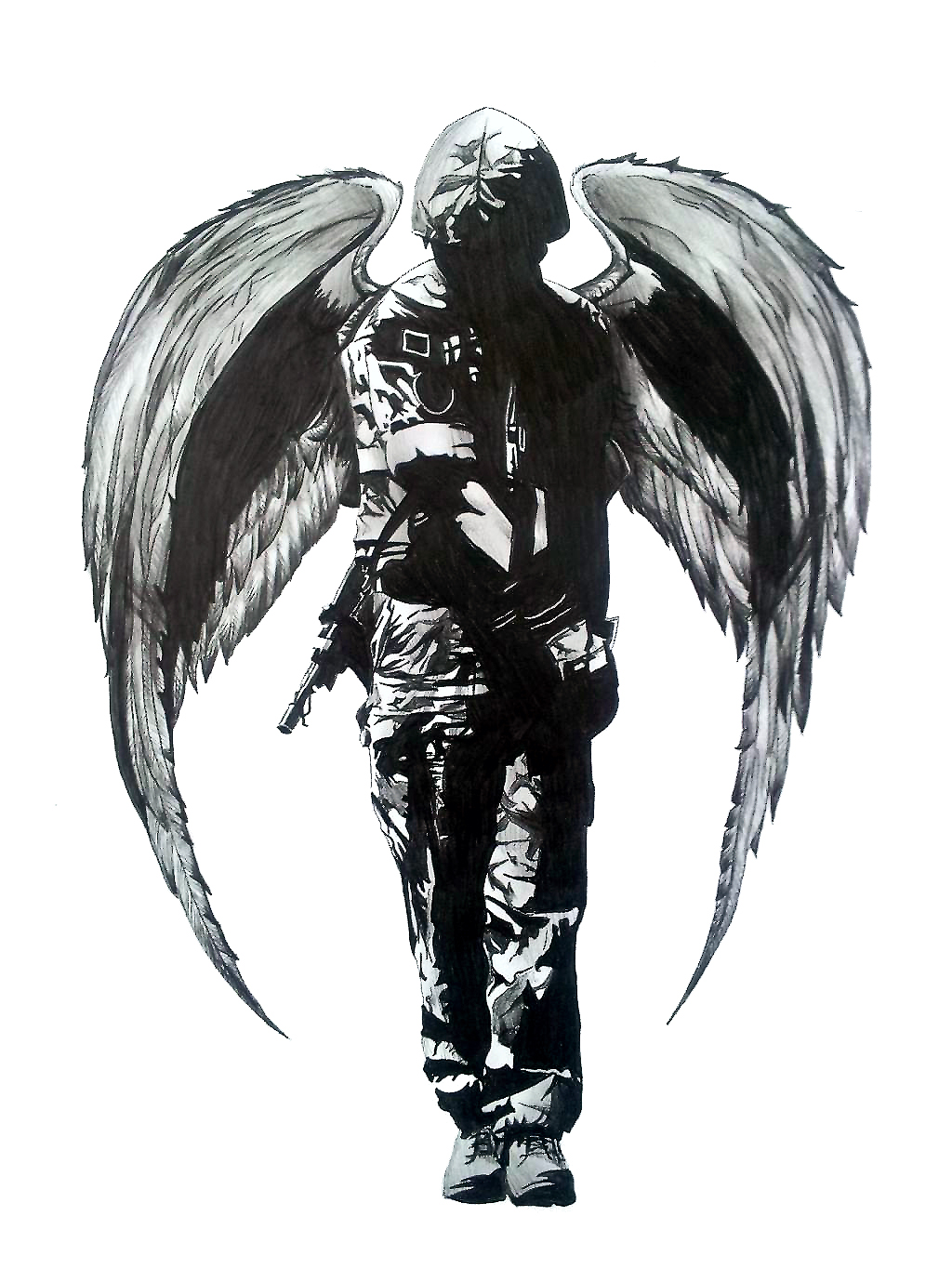
- Founded: 2011
- Type: HM Forces charities fundraising and awareness team
- Key people: Alan Gardner; Alice Smith; Simon Newman; Nicole Newman
- Website: veteranbandit.org.uk

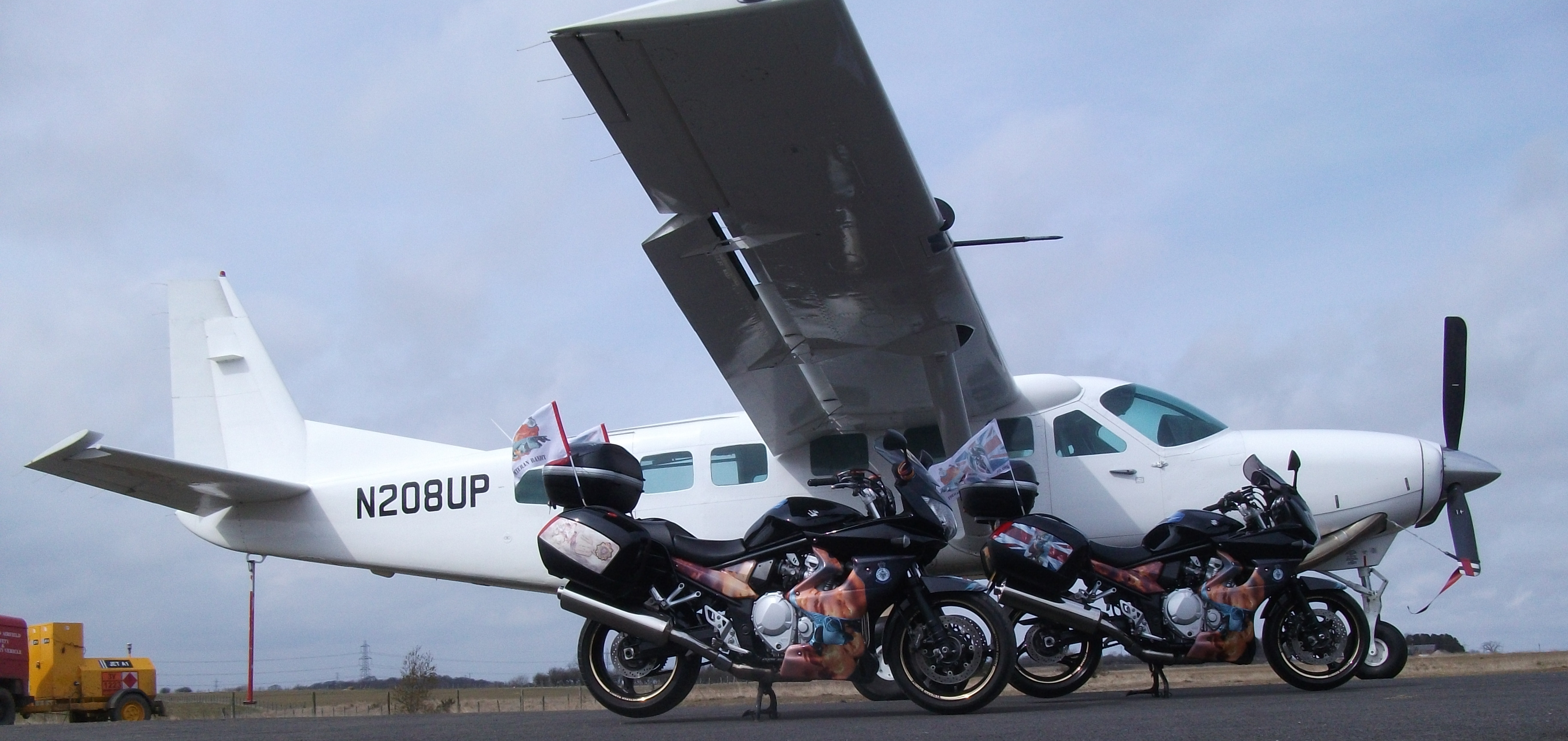
Custom Suzuki Motorcycles at Shotton Skydive Academy

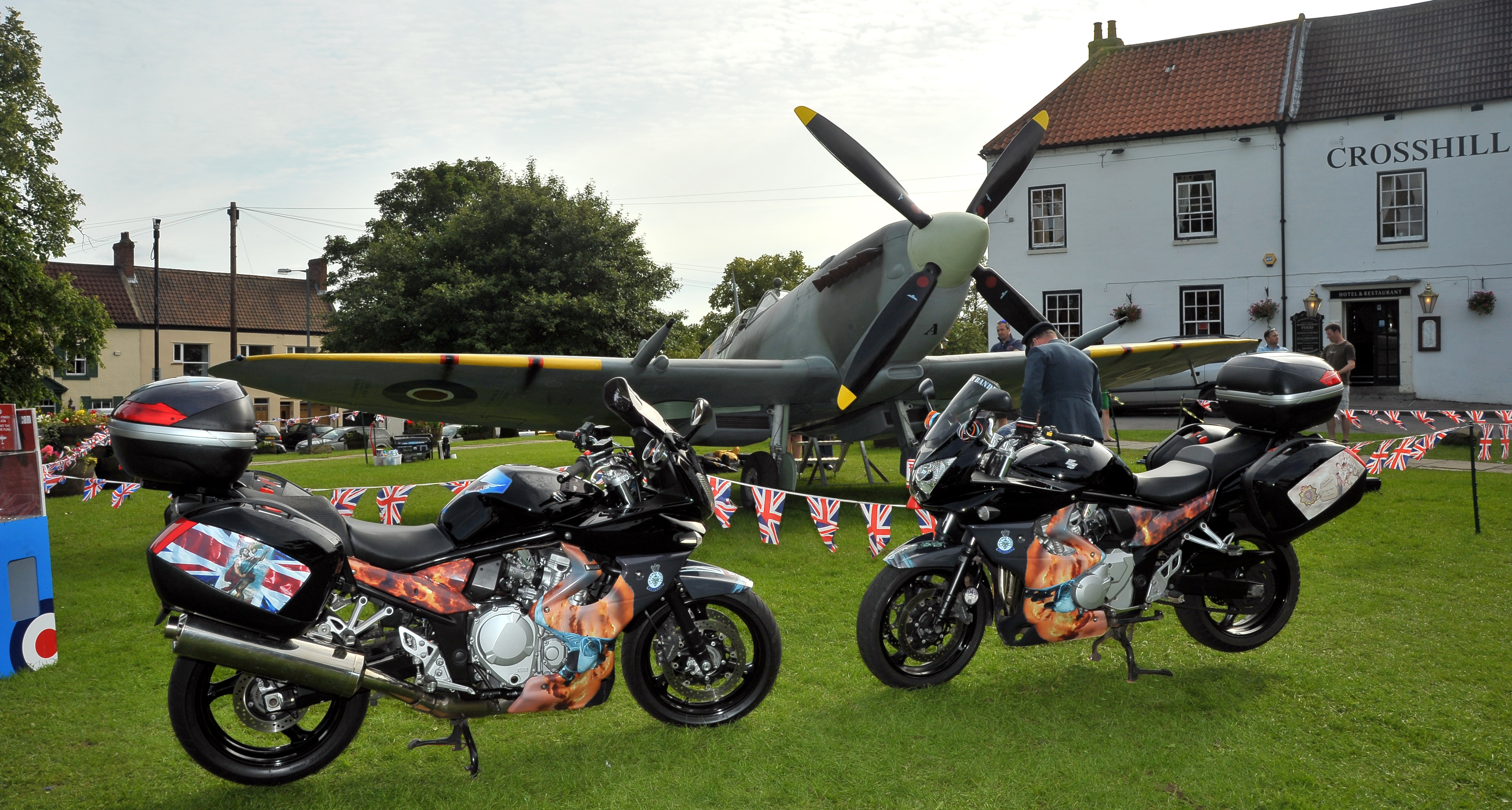
Customised Veteran Bandit bikes on show at Sedgefield in 2012

Veteran Bandit (or The Veteran Bandit) is a UK-based team of volunteers who raise both money and awareness for a wide variety of Armed Forces charities through roadshow appearances, fundraising events and information and publicity generated on their own website and via social media.

== History ==
Veteran Bandit, which is not a charity itself, was formed in June 2011 by former RAF servicemen and their families – all long-time fundraisers. The team came together as a response to the death in Afghanistan of a close family friend, Private Dean Hutchinson, 23, of the Royal Logistic Corps based at Buckley Barracks, Hullavington (formally RAF Hullavington).

== Organisation and main activities ==
Veteran Bandit now comprises a core group of nine individuals across Britain who support the efforts of various Forces charities and individual fundraisers. The team is particularly active in publicising events and collating and distributing information via Twitter and Facebook.

Using two customised Suzuki Bandit motorcycles, the group also attend shows and fundraising events in order to provide information and support to the general public and to veterans and their families. One-off fundraising activities have included biker meets and the organisation of a mass skydive at Shotton Airfield, near Peterlee, County Durham to raise money for RAF Association (RAFA), a charity supporting veterans of air forces of the Commonwealth.
