= Shoreditch (disambiguation) =

Shoreditch is an area in London.

Shoreditch may also refer to:

- Shoreditch (UK Parliament constituency)
- Shoreditch (London County Council constituency), England
- Metropolitan Borough of Shoreditch, a former district of the County of London, England
- Shoreditch, Somerset, a location in England
