= South Hetton railway station =

Disused railway station in South Hetton, County Durham

South Hetton
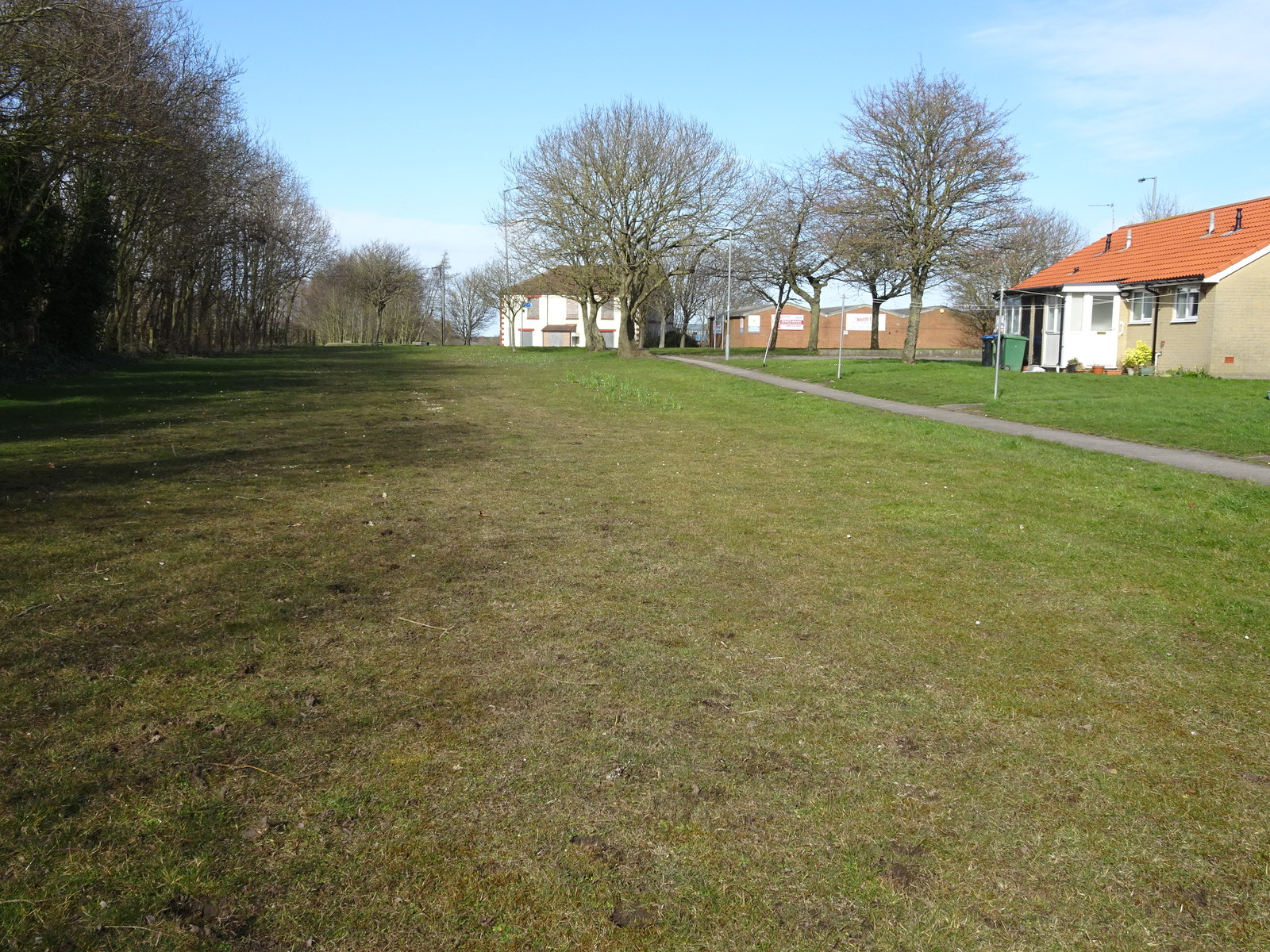
- Site of the station in 2020

General information
- Location: South Hetton, County Durham; England
- Coordinates: 54.8001°N 1.4133°W
- Grid reference: NZ378451
- Platforms: 2

Other information
- Status: Disused

History
- Original company: North Eastern Railway
- Pre-grouping: North Eastern Railway
- Post-grouping: LNER; British Railways (North Eastern Region)

Key dates
- June 1858: Opened
- 9 June 1963: Closed
Location

South Hetton railway station served the village of South Hetton, County Durham, England, from 1858 to 1952 on the Durham and Sunderland Railway.

== History ==
The station opened in 1858 on the North Eastern Railway. It was situated on the south side of Front Street on the A182. It closed on 9 June 1952. The site is now a footpath. The station hotel, derelict for a number of years, was put up for sale in autumn 2026.

Preceding station	Disused railways	Following station
Murton; Line and station closed	Durham and Sunderland Railway	Haswell; Line and station closed
