= Castle Eden railway station =

Disused railway station in Castle Eden, County Durham

Castle Eden
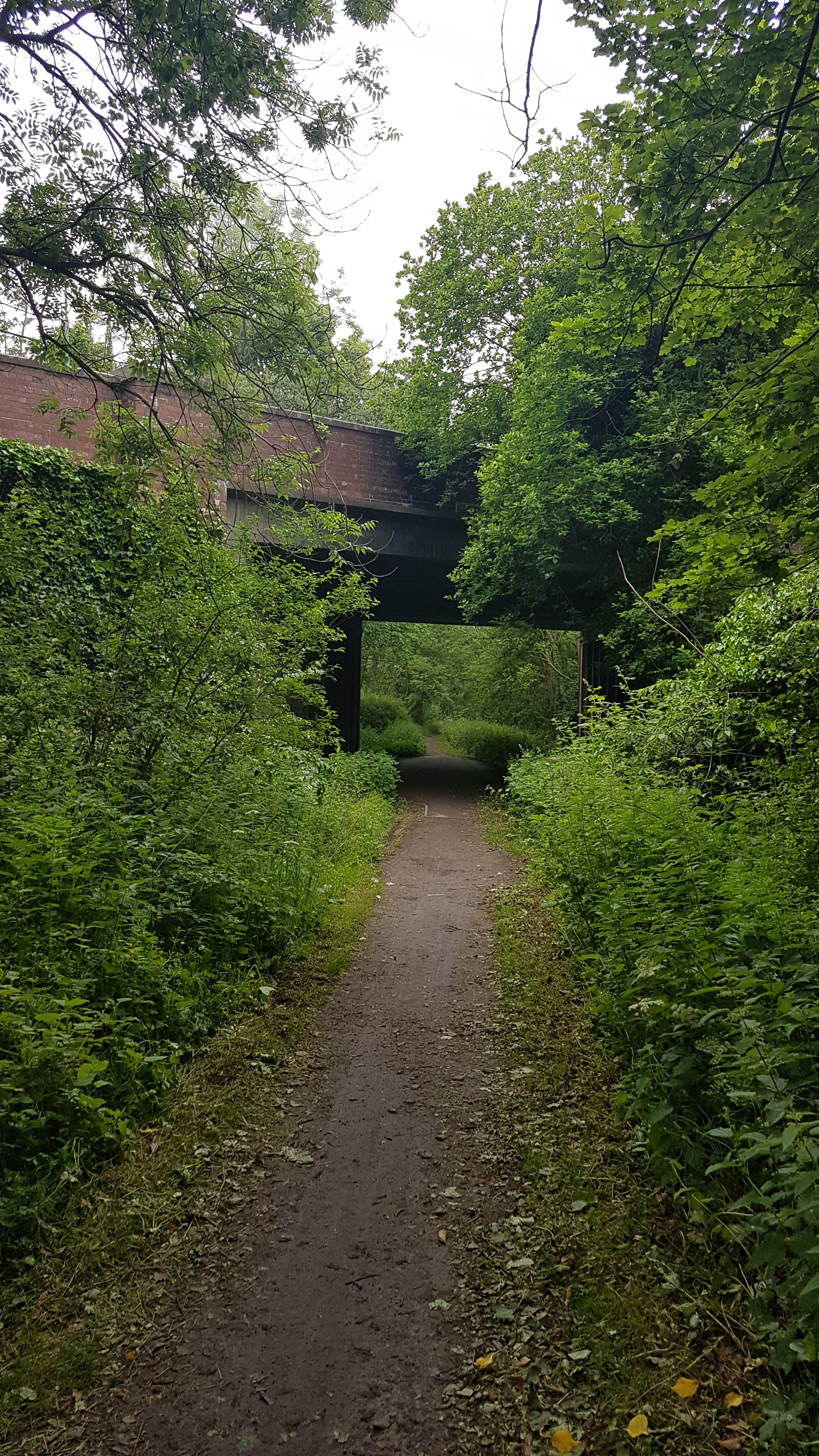
- The site of the station in 2020

General information
- Location: Castle Eden, County Durham; England
- Coordinates: 54.7307°N 1.3447°W
- Grid reference: NZ423375
- Platforms: 2

Other information
- Status: Disused

History
- Original company: Hartlepool Dock and Railway
- Pre-grouping: North Eastern Railway
- Post-grouping: LNER; British Railways (North Eastern)

Key dates
- 27 July 1839: Opened
- 9 June 1952: Closed to passengers
- 1 June 1964: Closed to freight
Location

Castle Eden railway station served the village of Castle Eden, County Durham, England, from 1839 to 1964 on the Hartlepool Dock and Railway.

== History ==
The station opened on 27 July 1839 by the Hartlepool Dock and Railway. It closed to passengers on 9 June 1952 and to goods on 1 June 1964. The site is now private housing.

Preceding station	Historical railways	Following station
Wellfield; Line and station closed	Hartlepool Dock and Railway	Hesleden; Line and station closed
