= Royal Air Forces Association =

British registered charity

- Founded: 1943
- Registration no.: Charity number 226686 (England & Wales), SC037673 (Scotland)
- Key people: Patron: His Majesty King Charles III; President: Air Marshal Sir Barry North
- Website: www.rafa.org.uk
- Formerly called: Comrades of the Royal Air Forces

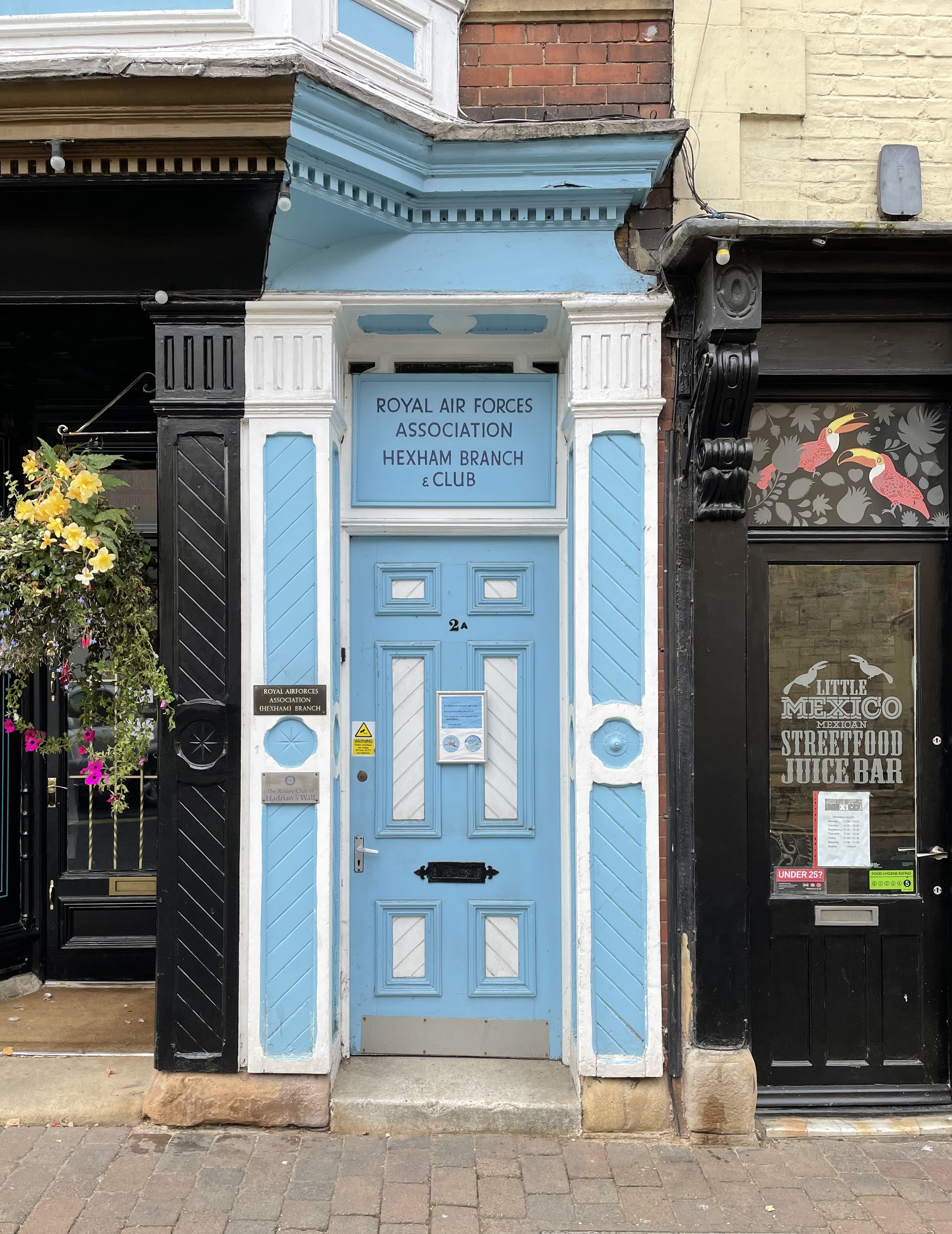
The Royal Air Forces Association branch & club in Hexham, Northumberland

The Royal Air Forces Association, also known as RAF Association or RAFA, is a British registered charity. It provides care and support to serving and retired members of the Air Forces of the British Commonwealth, and to their dependents.

The organisation was formed in 1943, and has 504 branches in the UK, with a total membership of approximately 79,000 in the UK and abroad. It receives no funding from the UK Government and operates entirely on donations and subscription fees. Its "Wings Appeal" raises around £2 million annually.

It provides five flying scholarships for members of the Air Training Corps and Girls Venture Corps Air Cadets, each year. It also runs a website where serving or ex-serving Air Force personnel can search for comrades.

== See also ==
- The Royal British Legion (RBL)
- SSAFA
- RAF Benevolent Fund (RAFBF)
- Royal Air Force (RAF)
- Veteran Bandit (UK-based team of fund-raising volunteers)
