= Thornley railway station =

Disused railway station in Durham, England

Thornley

General information
- Location: Thornley, County Durham; England
- Coordinates: 54.7471°N 1.3832°W
- Grid reference: NZ398393
- Platforms: 2

Other information
- Status: Disused

History
- Original company: North Eastern Railway
- Pre-grouping: North Eastern Railway
- Post-grouping: LNER; British Railways (North Eastern Region)

Key dates
- February 1858: Opened
- 9 June 1952: Closed
Location

Thornley railway station served the village of Thornley, County Durham, England, from 1858 to 1952 on the Hartlepool Dock and Railway.

== History ==
The station opened in February 1858 by the North Eastern Railway. It was also known as Thornley Junction in Bradshaw from 1879 to 1882 and in the 1880 North Eastern Railway timetable. It closed on 9 June 1952.

Preceding station	Disused railways	Following station
Wellfield; Line and station closed	Hartlepool Dock and Railway; North Eastern Railway	Shotton Bridge; Line and station closed
