= Shotton (surname) =

Shotton is a surname. Notable people with the surname include:

- Burt Shotton (1884–1962), American baseball player, manager, coach and scout
- James Shotton (1824–1896), English artist
- Liam Shotton (born 1987), English footballer
- Malcolm Shotton (born 1957), English footballer and manager
- Pete Shotton (1941–2017), English businessman and musician
- Ryan Shotton (born 1988), English footballer
- William Shotton (1840–1909), English cricketer
