= Shotton Colliery =

Village in County Durham, England

Coordinates: 54.759830°N 1.3942000°W

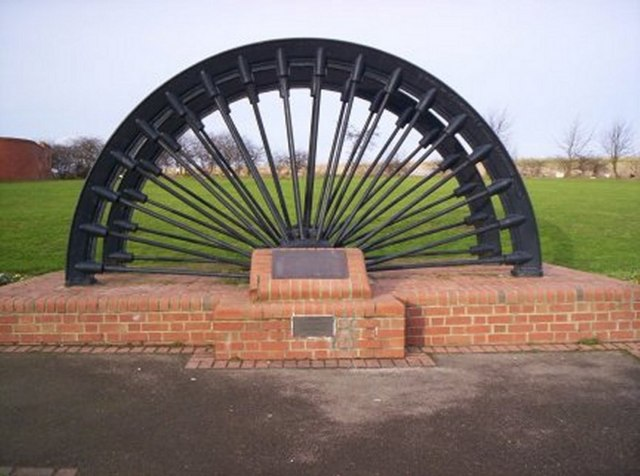
- Memorial Pit Wheel, Shotton Colliery.

- Location within County Durham
- OS grid reference: NZ3908240712
- Civil parish: Shotton
- Unitary authority: County Durham
- Ceremonial county: County Durham
- Region: North East
- Country: England
- Sovereign state: United Kingdom
- Post town: DURHAM
- Postcode district: DH6
- Dialling code: 0191
- Police: Durham
- Fire: County Durham and Darlington
- Ambulance: North East
- UK Parliament: Easington

Shotton Colliery is a village in County Durham, England.

The civil parish of Shotton includes Shotton Colliery village and an area to the west, south and east, but is bordered by the A19 road to the east and does not include the village of Old Shotton which is to the east of that road and forms part of the town of Peterlee. It has a parish council.

== History ==
=== The village ===
Old Shotton can be traced back as far as 900 AD, when it was known as Scitton, which in Old English means 'of the Scots', The village name was first recorded in 1165 as 'Sottun'. By the 16th century, when Easington was under the control of Prince Bishops, the village had become known as Shotton.

In 1756, the Brandlings built Shotton Hall and this eventually passed through marriage to the Burdon family.

=== The colliery ===
In 1833, the Haswell Coal Company began to sink a colliery to the west of Old Shotton, near Shotton Grange Farm. This pit began producing coal the following year, and the village of Shotton Colliery soon started to develop.

The pit was initially prosperous, but it closed on 3 November 1877, causing people to leave the village to work at other pits in the area. In 1900, the pit reopened and grew rapidly, leading to an increased population in the village. More housing was built, making other industries, including the Coke Works and the Brick Works, less popular.

By 1947, the original houses, east of the railway line, were in disrepair. Most of the bottom of Front Street was demolished.

In 1972, the National Coal Board announced that it was closing the colliery, at a cost of 800 jobs. Easington District Council built new housing in the 1970s, pulling down most of the remaining pit houses in an attempt to improve the village. Throughout most of the 1970s, work was done to remove the pit heap, which was at one time the largest in the country. The Brick Works and Coke Works went with the pit.

The only pit building left is now used as a second-hand car showroom. The remains of the pit baths remain semi-derelict.

== Present-day ==
Shotton Airfield/Peterlee Parachute Centre now occupies the colliery site, and it is common to see parachutists over the village most days.

Most of the parish's pubs, cinemas and the railway station have been demolished or converted to other uses. A small number of shops are left.

The village is now almost empty of work. There are a few industrial units close to the airfield and on the opposite side of the village at Thornley Crossings, but the main sources of employment are call centres which opened east of the village, dividing Shotton Colliery and Old Shotton.

Some of the buildings at Grange Farm remain and now overlook fields as they did in the 1840s, some of which contain the hard runway and hangars and other buildings of the parachute centre.

The war memorial in Front Street is Grade II listed and is the only listed building in the parish. It has an inscription "Erected 1920 by the parishioners and federated workmen of Shotton Colliery to the memory of the 152 men who fell in the Great War 1914-1919".

== Notable residents ==
- Bill Cockburn (1937–1995), footballer with Burnley F.C. and Gillingham F.C., was born in Shotton Colliery
- Maurice Cullen (1937–2001), boxer, lived in Shotton Colliery.
- Rebecca Posner (1929–2018), Professor of Romance Languages at the University of Oxford, was born in Shotton Colliery
