= Shortacross =

Hamlet in Cornwall, England

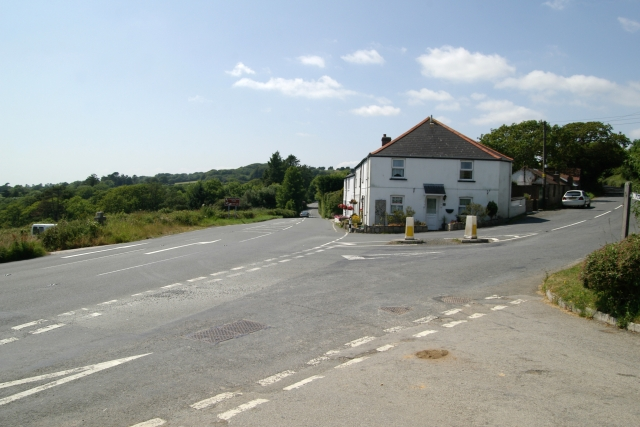
The junction of the A387 and the B3253 Looe road at Shortacross

Shortacross is a hamlet in the civil parish of Morval in east Cornwall, England, United Kingdom.
