= Shatterling =

Hamlet in Kent, England

Coordinates: 51.28°N 1.24°E

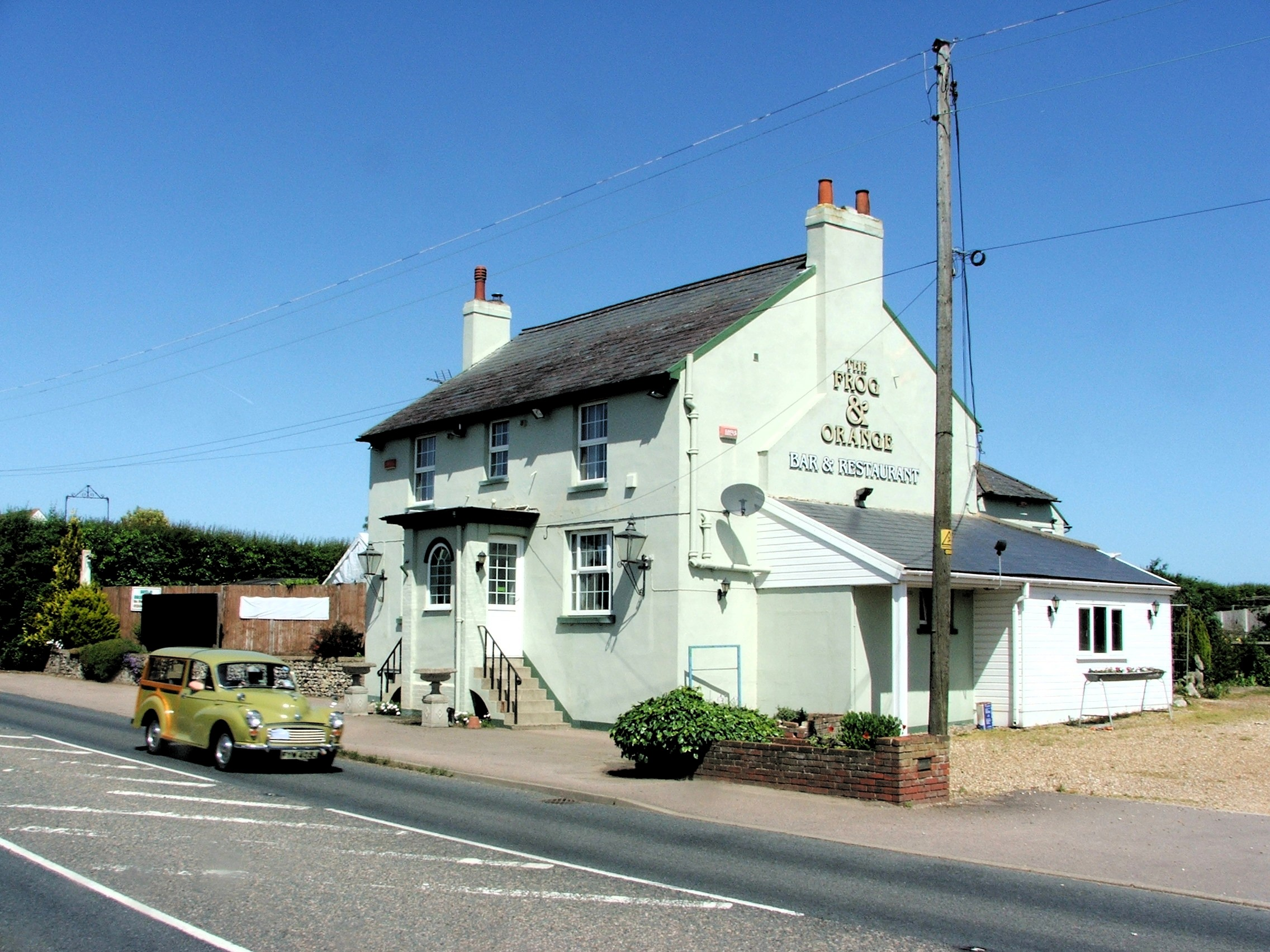
- The Frog & Orange, Shatterling

- Location within Kent
- District: Dover
- Shire county: Kent
- Region: South East
- Country: England
- Sovereign state: United Kingdom
- Post town: Canterbury
- Postcode district: CT3
- Police: Kent
- Fire: Kent
- Ambulance: South East Coast

Shatterling is a village in the Dover district of Kent, England located along the A257 road about two miles 3.2 kilometres (2 mi) east of Wingham. The population of the hamlet is included within the civil parish of Staple.
