= Haswell railway station =

Disused railway station in Haswell, County Durham

Haswell

General information
- Location: Haswell, County Durham; England
- Platforms: 2

Other information
- Status: Disused

History
- Original company: Hartlepool Dock and Railway Company
- Pre-grouping: Durham and Sunderland Railway
- Post-grouping: LNER; British Railways (North Eastern Region)

Key dates
- April 1837: Opened
- 1858: Resited
- 9 June 1952: Closed

Haswell railway station served the village of Haswell, County Durham, England, from 1837 to 1952 on the Hartlepool Dock and Railway.

== History ==
=== First station ===
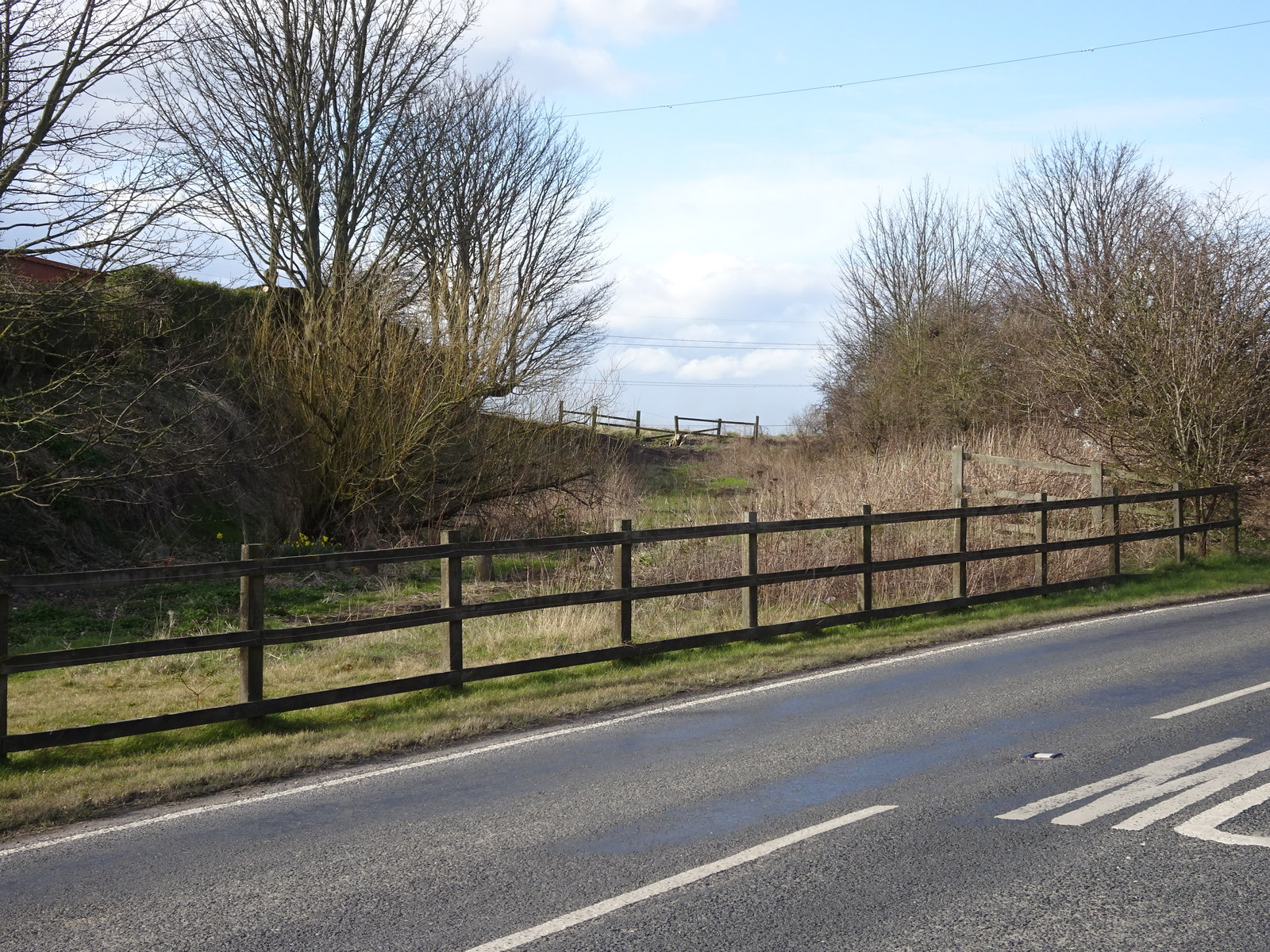
Coordinates: 54.7865°N 1.4184°W
It opened to goods on 23 November 1835, by the Hartlepool Dock and Railway Company. The station opened for passengers in April 1837. It closed in 1858 and was resited.

=== Second station ===
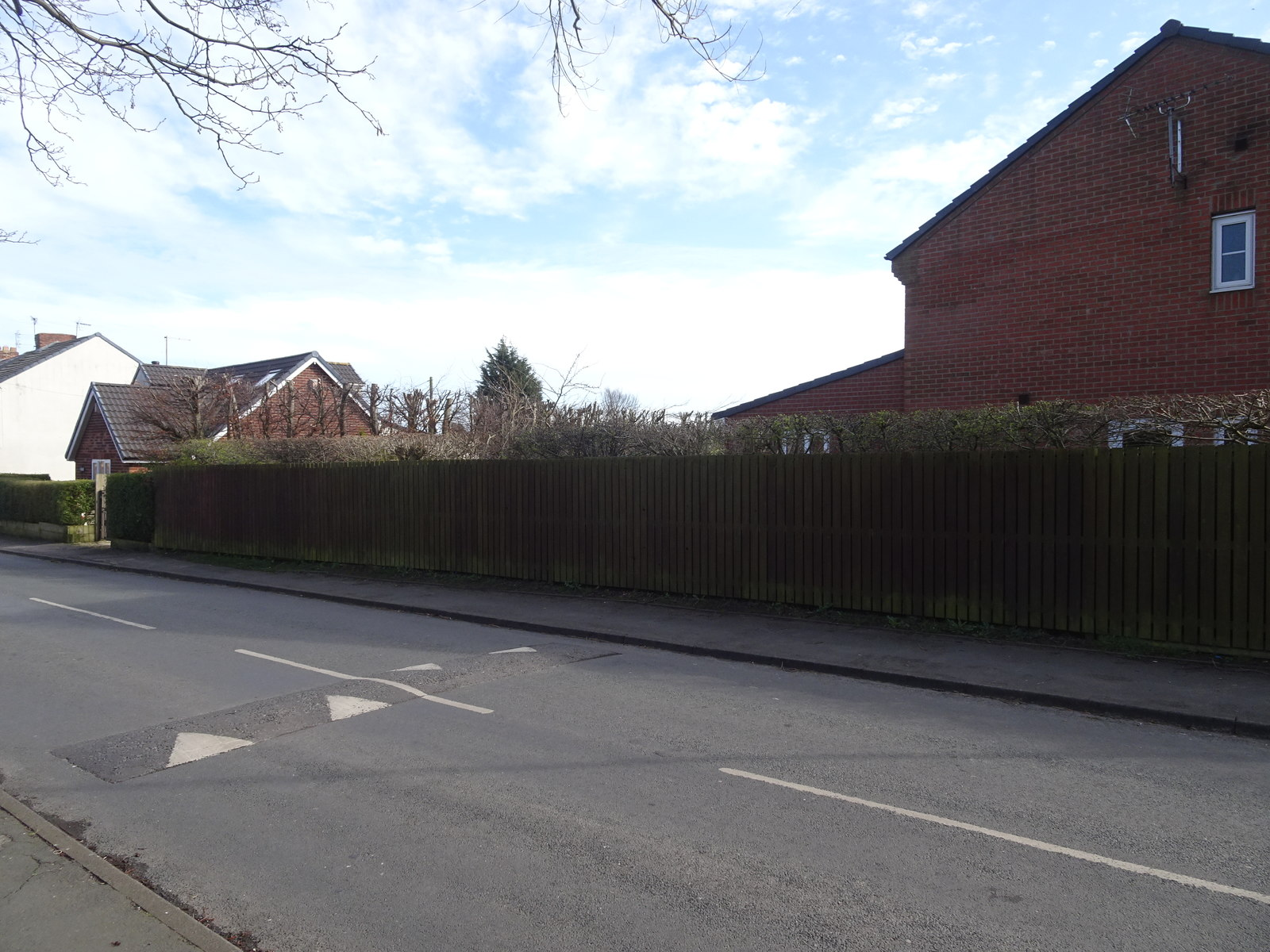
Coordinates: 54.7845°N 1.4149°W
The second site of the station opened in 1858. It had a station building on the northbound platform and a signal box immediately to the north. It closed to passengers on 9 June 1952. Nothing remains.

Preceding station	Disused railways	Following station
Shotton Bridge; Line and station closed	Hartlepool Dock and Railway	South Hetton; Line and station closed
