= Shootash =

Hamlet in Hampshire, England

Coordinates: 50.996430°N 1.5452°W

- Crossroads at Shootash

- Location within Hampshire
- OS grid reference: SU3201321991
- District: Test Valley
- Shire county: Hampshire
- Region: South East
- Country: England
- Sovereign state: United Kingdom
- Post town: ROMSEY
- Postcode district: SO51
- Dialling code: 01794
- Police: Hampshire and Isle of Wight
- Fire: Hampshire and Isle of Wight
- Ambulance: South Central
- UK Parliament: North West Hampshire

Before World War I, Shootash was originally an area consisting of a few farmsteads, woodland, and common land which subsequently developed during the 20th century into a small hamlet along the main A27 Romsey to Whiteparish road, lying within the northern boundary of the civil parish of Wellow, in the Test Valley district of Hampshire, England. Its nearest town is Romsey, which lies approximately 2.5 miles (4.1 km) south-east from the hamlet. The village of Wellow (also known as West Wellow) lies approximately 2 miles (3 km) south-west from the hamlet.
