= Shirkoak =

Hamlet in Kent, England

Coordinates: 51.0903°N 0.7738°E

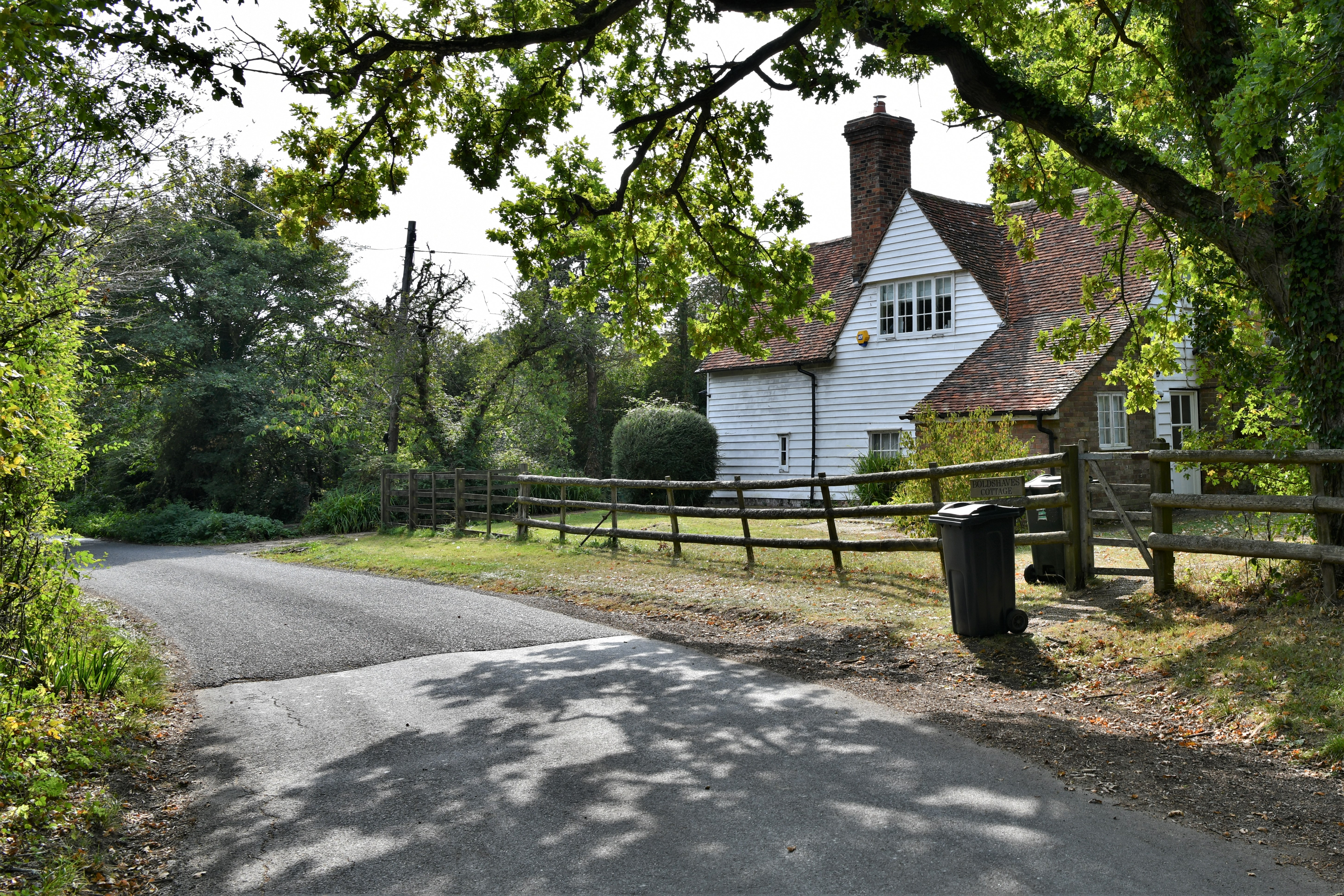
- Boldshaves Cottage

- Location within Kent
- District: Ashford
- Shire county: Kent
- Region: South East
- Country: England
- Sovereign state: United Kingdom
- Post town: Ashford
- Postcode district: TN26
- Police: Kent
- Fire: Kent
- Ambulance: South East Coast
- UK Parliament: Ashford

Shirkoak is a hamlet in the civil parish of Woodchurch, southwest of the town of Ashford in Kent, England.
