= Shotton Hall =

- Location in County Durham

General information
- Location: County Durham, England
- Coordinates: 54.750805°N 1.357037°W
- OS grid: NZ4148039740

Shotton Hall is a former mansion in Peterlee, County Durham, England. It is Grade II listed and is now operated by Peterlee Town Council as offices and a conference centre. It lies in the west of the town of Peterlee, just east of the A19 road near the village of Old Shotton.

== History ==
The Manor of Shotton, near Peterlee, County Durham, was owned by the Thompson family. In 1756 the Thompson heiress, Elizabeth, married Charles Brandling and they commissioned the building of a new mansion to replace the existing manor house.

The Hall was enlarged and improved in about 1820 but the Shotton estate was sold by the Brandlings in 1850 to Shotton Coal Company. The Hall was occupied by the Burdon family and later by a series of tenants. It fell into a state of neglect and disrepair.

== Council ownership ==
In 1949 the Hall was occupied by the Peterlee Development Corporation and in 1984 was acquired by the Peterlee Town Council who restored the property for their own occupation. This is a Grade II listed building.

== Owners and residents ==
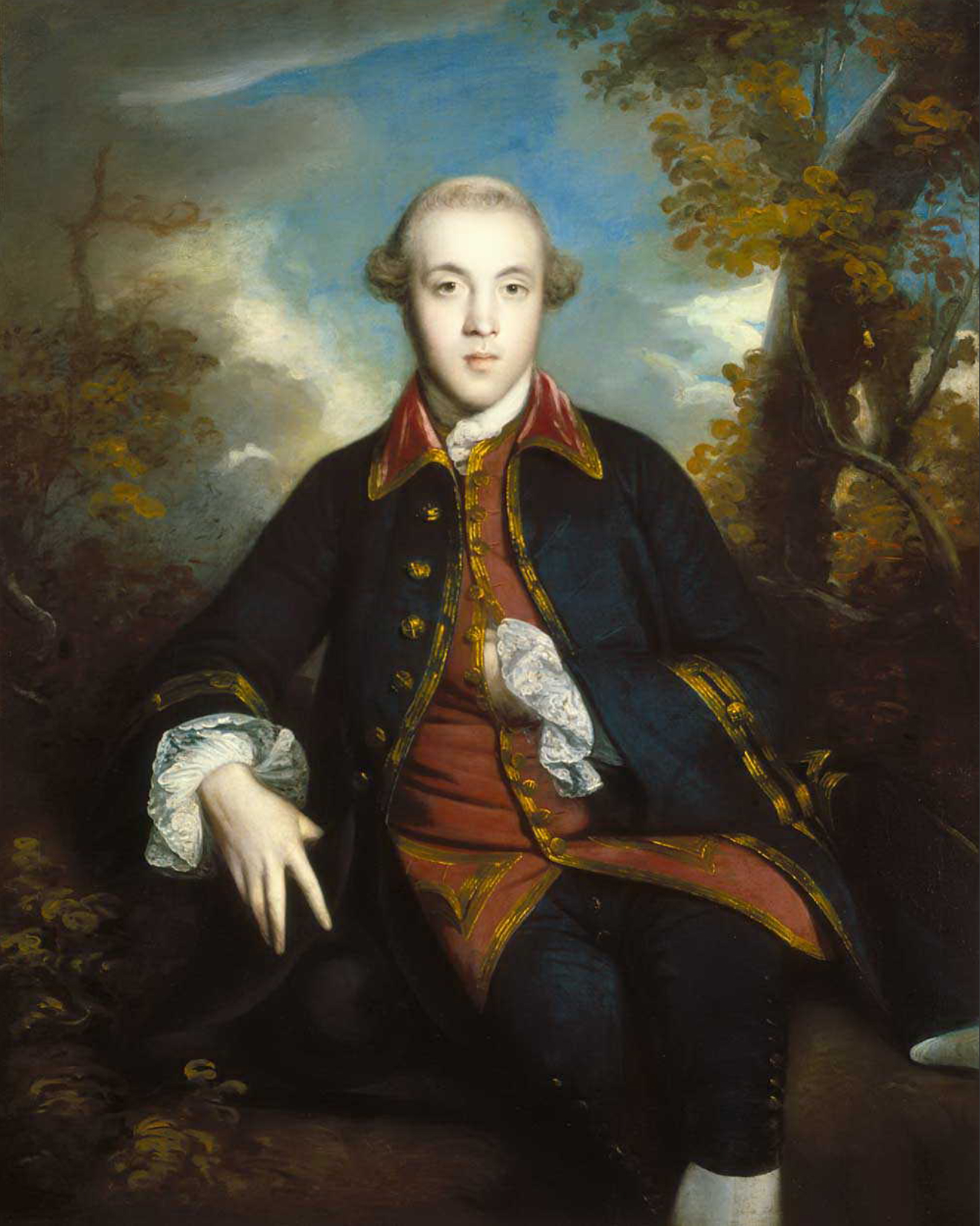
Portrail of Charles Brandling (1733-1802) by Joshua Reynolds in 1760 at about the same time he built Shottle Hall

Charles Brandling (1733-1802) and his wife Elizabeth Thompson (1731-1785) built Shotton Hall in about 1760 which was soon after their wedding. He was descended from the Brandling family of Newcastle and Gosforth who were wealthy landowners and merchants. Elizabeth was the daughter and heiress of John Thompson of Shottle and it was she that brought the land on which Shottle Hall is built, into their marriage. The couple had 5 sons and eight daughters. There is a painting by Joshua Reynolds of Charles created in 1760 which is shown.

When Charles died in 1802 his eldest son Charles John Brandling (1769-1826) became the owner of the house. He was a member of parliament and wealthy landowner. In 1793 he married Frances Elizabeth Hawksworth (1773-1815) who was the daughter of Walter Fawkes (formerly Hawksworth}. The couple had no children so when Charles died in 1826 his younger brother Ralph Henry Brandling inherited his estates.

Ralph Henry Brandling (1771-1853) who was a clergyman shared the running of his estates with his son Charles John Brandling (1797-1856). They started to have financial difficulties in 1835. By 1850 Charles was forced to sell his estates including Shotton Hall to the Shotton Coal Company. They retained ownership of the Hall for the next 30 years.

In about 1880 the Reverend John Burdon (1811-1893) of The Castle, Castle Eden which is nearby bought the Hall. When he died in 1892 his eldest son Rowland Burdon (1858-1944) became the owner. After his death in 1944 his eldest daughter Frances Mary Burdon (1890-1949) inherited the estates. She had married in 1913 Walter Dashwood Slater Booth (1869-1953) and so the Burdon estates were brought into the Slater Booth family.

By 1950 the Hall was owned by the Peterlee Development Corporation. In 1984 it was bought by the Peterlee Town Council who still own it today. It is now used as their offices and meeting rooms. The Hall also provides facilities for civil wedding ceremony and conferences.
