= William Shotton =

English cricketer

William Shotton (1 December 1840 – 26 May 1909) was an English first-class cricketer, who played two matches for Yorkshire County Cricket Club against Kent in 1865, and Gloucestershire in 1874.

Born in Lascelles Hall, Huddersfield, Yorkshire, England, Shotton was a right-handed batsman, who scored 13 runs at 3.25, with a best score of 7 against Kent. His right arm round arm medium bowling was not called upon.

Shotton died in May 1909 in Kirkheaton, Yorkshire. His father in law, Luke Greenwood, played 69 games for Yorkshire.
