= Shallowford, Devon =

Hamlet in Devon, England

Coordinates: 51.189993°N 3.842095°W

Shallowford
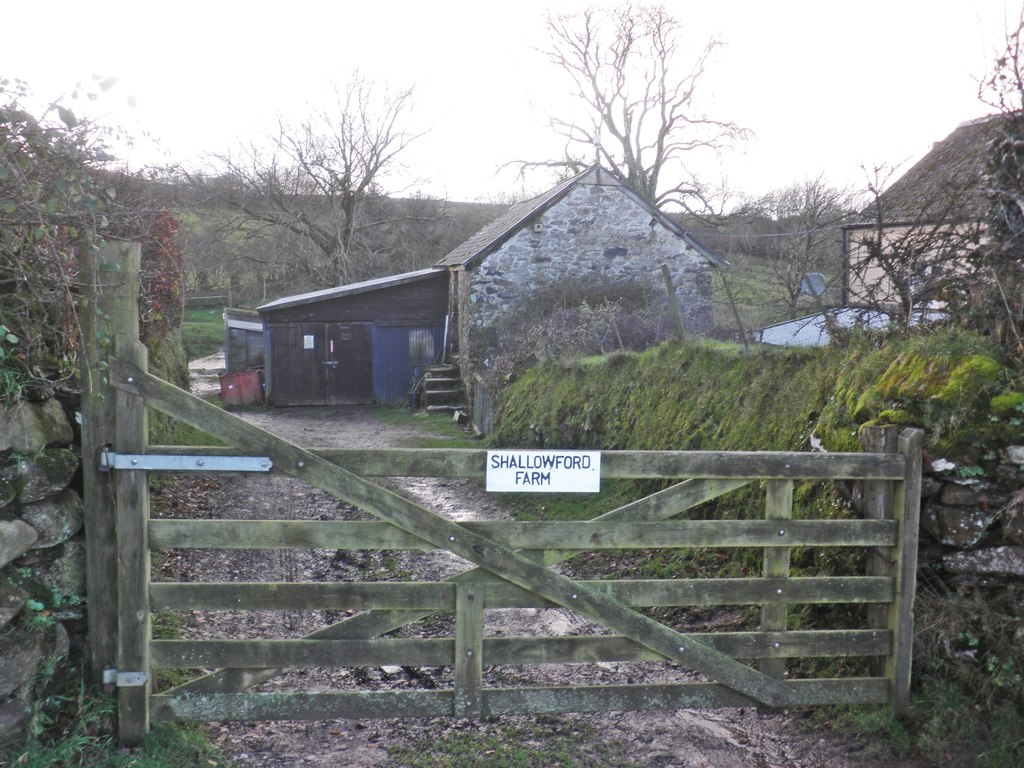
- Shallowford Farm

- Location within Devon
- OS grid reference: SS7136745032
- Civil parish: Lynton and Lynmouth
- Unitary authority: North Devon
- Ceremonial county: Devon
- Region: South West
- Country: England
- Sovereign state: United Kingdom
- Post town: LYNTON
- Postcode district: EX35 6P
- Police: Devon and Cornwall
- Fire: Devon and Somerset
- Ambulance: South Western

Shallowford is a hamlet in the civil parish of Lynton and Lynmouth in the North Devon district of Devon, England. Its nearest town is Lynton, which lies approximately 3.2 miles (5.1 km) north-east from the hamlet.
