= 1862 English cricket season =

Cricket season review

The 1862 English cricket season was the 36th of the roundarm era. (Note: Any match listed in the ACS' Important Match Guide (1981) is historically important, and therefore of the highest standard, whether or not a scorecard might exist. The same applies to numerous matches discovered by researchers since 1981. For further information, see First-class cricket.) The overarm bowling issue came to a head in a controversial match at The Oval.

== Important matches ==
- 1862 match list

== Events ==
26 August. Surrey v. England at The Oval. Edgar Willsher of England was no-balled six times in succession by John Lillywhite (son of FW Lillywhite) for bowling with his hand above the shoulder. For some years previously, Willsher and others had bowled in this way and the incident at The Oval put the issue into context. The drama was exaggerated when Willsher and England's other eight professionals walked off the field. Play continued next day but with a replacement umpire.

== Leading batsmen ==
Thomas Hayward was the leading runscorer with 661 @ 31.47

== Leading bowlers ==
George Tarrant was the leading wicket-taker with 96 @ 10.07

== Bibliography ==
- ACS (1981). A Guide to Important Cricket Matches Played in the British Isles 1709–1863. Nottingham: ACS. OCLC 85045528.
- Warner, Pelham (1946). Lords: 1787–1945. London: Harrap. OCLC 877106024.
