= Shutta =

Suburb in the Cornwall region of England

Coordinates: 50°21′37″N 4°27′13″W

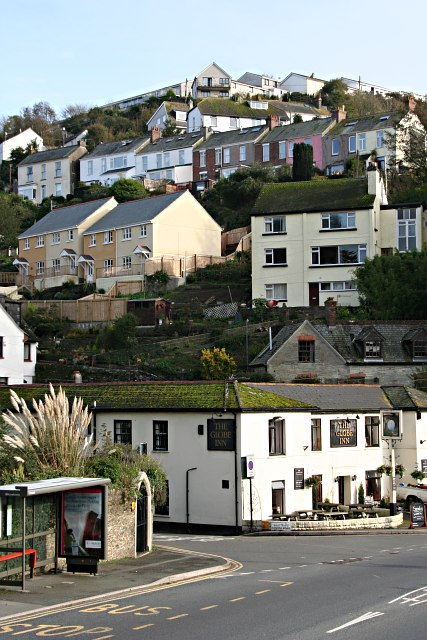
The hillside at Shutta

Shutta is a northern suburb of Looe, Cornwall, England, United Kingdom.
