= High Moorsley =

Village in Tyne and Wear, England

Coordinates: 54°48.3′N 1°28.5′W

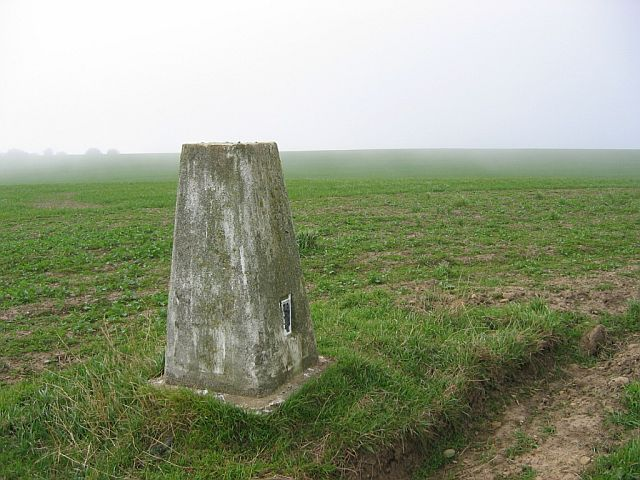
- High Moorsley Triangulation pillar on a misty arable hill

- Location within Tyne and Wear
- Civil parish: Hetton
- Metropolitan borough: Sunderland
- Metropolitan county: Tyne and Wear
- Region: North East
- Country: England
- Sovereign state: United Kingdom
- Police: Northumbria
- Fire: Tyne and Wear
- Ambulance: North East

High Moorsley is a small village 1 mile (1.6 km) south-west of Hetton-le-Hole, in the civil parish of Hetton, in the Sunderland district, in the county of Tyne and Wear, England.

It is the site of the first weather radar system in the north-east of England, officially opened in July 2009.

High Moorsley Quarry is a Site of Special Scientific Interest for its Permian magnesian limestone formation.
