= Shotton, Sedgefield =

Coordinates: 54.622°N 1.429°W

Shotton
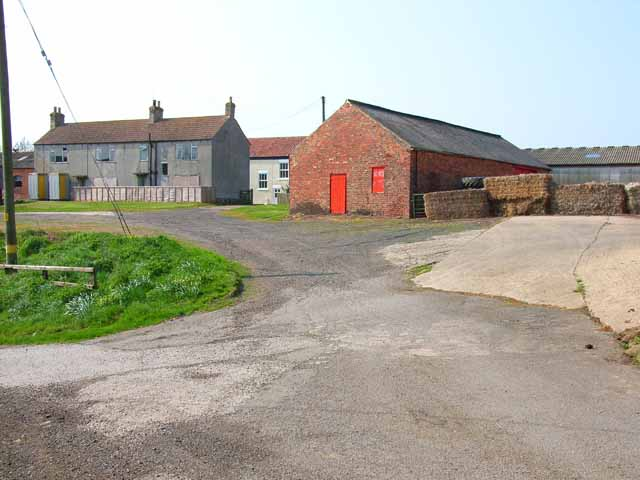
- Farm at Shotton

- Location within County Durham
- OS grid reference: NZ369253
- Civil parish: Sedgefield
- Unitary authority: County Durham
- Ceremonial county: Durham
- Region: North East
- Country: England
- Sovereign state: United Kingdom
- Post town: TEESSIDE
- Postcode district: TS21
- Police: Durham
- Fire: County Durham and Darlington
- Ambulance: North East

Shotton is a hamlet in the civil parish of Sedgefield, in County Durham, England. It is situated to the north-west of Stockton-on-Tees. Until 1983 it was in Foxton and Shotton parish.The settlement has an agricultural history, with documentary evidence of landholding at Shotton dating from at least the 17th century.

In Samuel Lewis's A Topographical Dictionary of England (1848) it is described as "containing 44 inhabitants. The manor of "Foxdene" belonged to the Knights Templars, whose possessions, on the dissolution of their order, were transferred to the Knights Hospitallers of St. John...[the] township comprises about 1,787 acres of rather poor land...The tithes have been commuted for £82."
