= Old Shotton =

Village in Peterlee, County Durham, England

Coordinates: 54.751°N 1.362°W

Old Shotton is a village in Peterlee, County Durham, England. The village once lay on the route of the A19, before its bypass to the west of the village. Although Old Shotton retains its own identity, and its own village sign, it now forms part of the town of Peterlee, and it has been described as "the only developed part of Peterlee to predate the new town."

Following the foundation of Peterlee in 1948, the town spread westward, towards the A19, and so by the 1970s this small village had already begun to be encroached on. The village is home to two old pubs, "The Black Bull" and "The Royal George" which were both inns on the old A19. Nearby is Shotton Hall, home of Peterlee town council. Its ballroom is used for both private and public functions.

Today, thanks to the redirection of the A19 in the 1970s, Old Shotton is now a quiet cul-de-sac. There are some 30 dwellings, most of which are post 1960s, and only about 10 which pre-date the 1950s.

The village is not part of the civil parish of Shotton, which includes the village of Shotton Colliery, as the A19 road forms the eastern boundary of that parish.
