= Murton railway station =

Disused railway station in Murton, Tyne and Wear

Murton
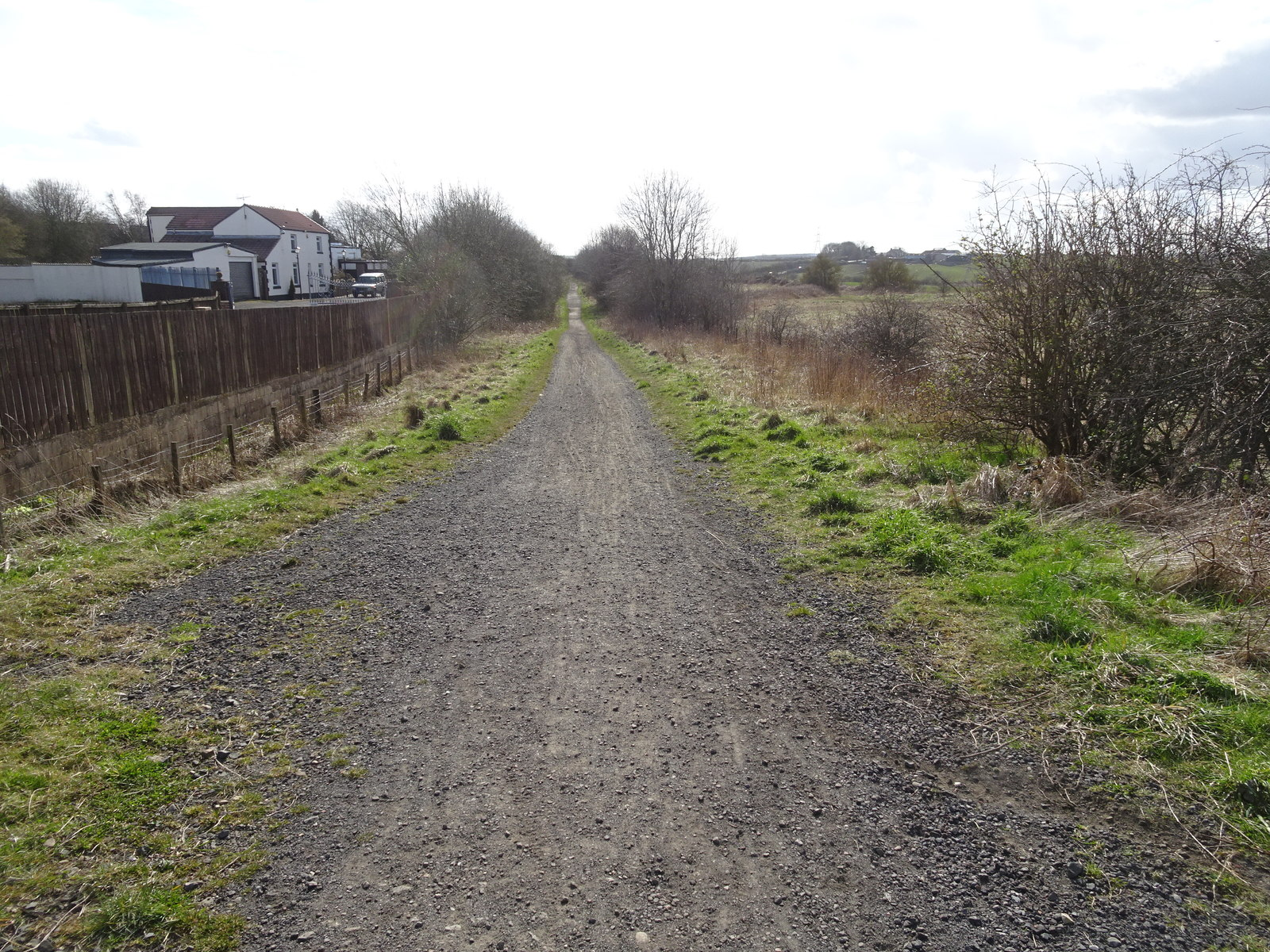
- The site of the station, looking south towards Stockton, in 2020

General information
- Location: Murton, County Durham; England
- Coordinates: 54.8193°N 1.4067°W
- Grid reference: NZ382473
- Platforms: 2

Other information
- Status: Disused

History
- Original company: Durham and Sunderland Railway
- Pre-grouping: North Eastern Railway
- Post-grouping: LNER; British Railways (North Eastern Region)

Key dates
- April 1837: Opened
- 5 January 1953: Closed
Location

Murton railway station served the village of Murton, County Durham, England, from 1837 to 1953 on the Durham and Sunderland Railway.

== History ==
The station opened in April 1837 by the Durham and Sunderland Railway. Some tickets showed it as Murton Junction. It closed on 5 January 1953. The site is now a footpath that leads southwards to South Hetton, and northwards to Seaton and Ryhope.

Preceding station	Disused railways	Following station
Ryhope; Line and station closed	Durham and Sunderland Railway	Hetton; Line and station closed
