= List of constant species in the British National Vegetation Classification =

The following is a list of vascular plants, bryophytes and lichens which are constant species in one or more community of the British National Vegetation Classification system.

== Vascular plants ==
=== Grasses ===
English name	Scientific name	Communities
Brown bent	Agrostis vinealis	H6
Common bent	Agrostis capillaris	MG3, MG5, SD12, CG10, W11
Bristle bent	Agrostis curtisii	H3, H4
Creeping bent	Agrostis stolonifera	MG10, MG11, MG12, MG13, MC10, SD17
Marsh foxtail	Alopecurus geniculatus	MG13
Meadow foxtail	Alopecurus pratensis	MG4
Marram	Ammophila arenaria	SD12, SD19
Sweet vernal-grass	Anthoxanthum odoratum	MG3, MG5, MG8, W11
False oat-grass	Arrhenatherum elatius	MG1, MG2
Meadow oat-grass	Avenula pratensis	CG2, CG6
Downy oat-grass	Avenula pubescens	CG6
Tor-grass	Brachypodium pinnatum	CG4, CG5
Quaking grass	Briza media	CG2, CG5
Upright brome	Bromus erectus	CG3, CG5
Crested dog's-tail	Cynosurus cristatus	MG4, MG5, MG6, MG8
Cock's-foot	Dactylis glomerata	MG3, MG5, MG1, MG2, MC4, CG1
Tufted hair-grass	Deschampsia cespitosa ssp. cespitosa	MG9, H21
Wavy hair-grass	Deschampsia flexuosa	H2, W11, H9, H12, H14, H15, H16, H17, H18, H19, H20, H22
Smooth finger-grass	Digitaria ischaemum	OV5
Sea couch	Elymus pycnanthus	SM24
Common couch	Elytrigia repens	OV5
Tall fescue	Festuca arundinacea	MG12
Sheep's fescue	Festuca ovina	H1, H5, H7, H20, CG1, CG2, CG3, CG4, CG5, CG7, U6, SD12, CG10
Red fescue	Festuca rubra	MG2, MG3, MG4, MG5, MG6, MG8, MG11, MG12, MC1, MC2, MC3, MC4, MC5, MC6, MC10, CG6, CG10, SD19, MC12
Viviparous fescue	Festuca vivipara	H20
Yorkshire-fog	Holcus lanatus	MG3, MG4, MG5, MG6, MG8, MG9, MG10, H7, MC12
Creeping soft-grass	Holcus mollis	W11
Crested hair-grass	Koeleria macrantha	CG2
Perennial rye-grass	Lolium perenne	MG4, MG6
Purple moor-grass	Molinia caerulea	H3, H4, H5
Common reed	Phragmites australis	W2
Annual meadow-grass	Poa annua	OV4, OV5, OV20
Smooth meadow-grass	Poa pratensis	SD12
MG3, rough meadow-grass	Poa trivialis	MG2, MG8
Sand cat's-tail	Phleum arenarium	SD19
Common saltmarsh-grass	Puccinellia maritima	SM10

=== Sedges and rushes ===
English name	Scientific name	Communities
Sand sedge	Carex arenaria	SD11, SD12, SD19, H11
Stiff sedge	Carex bigelowii	H19, H20
Tufted sedge	Carex elata	S1
Glaucous sedge	Carex flacca	CG2, CG3, CG4, CG5, H6
Common sedge	Carex nigra	SD17
Flea sedge	Carex pulicaris	H5
Bottle sedge	Carex rostrata	W3, M4
Deergrass	Cirpus cespitosus	H15
Common cottongrass	Eriophorum angustifolium	M1, M2, M3, M20
Hare's-tail cottongrass	Eriophorum vaginatum	M20
Soft rush	Juncus effusus	MG10
Heath rush	Juncus squarrosus	U6
Black bog-rush	Schoenus nigricans	H5

=== Trees ===
English name	Scientific name	Communities
Field maple	Acer campestre	W8
Alder	Alnus glutinosa	W5, W6, W7
Silver birch	Betula pendula	W11
Downy birch	Betula pubescens	W2, W4, W11
Hazel	Corylus avellana	W8, W9
Ash	Fraxinus excelsior	W8, W9
Juniper	Juniperus communis	W19
Alpine juniper	Juniperus communis ssp. nana	H15
Scots pine	Pinus sylvestris	W18
English oak	Quercus robur	W10
Sessile oak	Quercus petraea	W11, W17
Grey willow	Salix cinerea	W1, W2, W3
Bay willow	Salix pentandra	W3
Yew	Taxus baccata	W13

=== Other dicotyledons ===
English name	Scientific name	Communities
A lady's-mantle	Alchemilla glabra	MG3
Wild angelica	Angelica sylvestris	W3, MG2
Alpine bearberry	Arctostaphylos alpinu	H17
Bearberry	Arctostaphylos uva-ursi	H16
Thyme-leaved sandwort	Arenaria serpyllifolia	SD19
Thrift	Armeria maritima	MC1, MC2, MC3, MC5
Spear-leaved orache	Atriplex prostata agg.	MC6
Sea beet	Beta vulgaris ssp. maritima	MC6
Wild cabbage	Brassica oleracea	MC4
Sea rocket	Cakile maritima	SD2
Heather	Calluna vulgaris	H1, H2, H3, H4, H7, H8, H9, H10, H11, H12, H13, H14, H15, H16, H17, H21, H22
Marsh-marigold	Caltha palustris	W3, MG8
Harebell	Campanula rotundifolia	CG10
Cuckooflower	Cardamine pratensis	W3
Carline thistle	Carlina vulgaris	CG1
Black knapweed	Centaurea nigra	MG5
Sea mouse-ear	Cerastium diffusum ssp. diffusum	MC5
Common mouse-ear	Cerastium fontanum	MG3, MG4, MG6, MG8
Corn marigold	Chrysanthemum segetum	OV4
Pignut	Conopodium majus	MG3
Dwarf cornel	Cornus suecica	H22
Smooth hawk's-beard	Crepis capillaris	OV5
Rock samphire	Crithmum maritimum	MC1
Crosswort	Cruciata laevipes	MG2
Ivy-leaved toadflax	Cymbalaria muralis	OV42
Sea carrot	Daucus carota ssp. gummifer	MC4
Round-leaved sundew	Drosera rotundifolia	M2
Crowberry	Empetrum nigrum ssp nigrum	H13
Mountain crowberry	Empetrum nigrum ssp hermaphroditum	H20, H22
Broad-leaved willowherb	Epilobium montanum	MG2
Bell heather	Erica cinerea	H2, H3, H4, H6, H7, H8, H10, H15, H16
Cross-leaved heath	Erica tetralix	M2, H3, H4, H5
Cornish heath	Erica vagans	H5, H6
Common stork's-bill	Erodium cicutarium	OV5
Meadowsweet	Filipendula ulmaria	W3, MG4, MG2, H6
Cleavers	Galium aparine	SD3
Common marsh-bedstraw	Galium palustre	W1, W3
Heath bedstraw	Galium saxatile	W11, H18, H20,
Dove's-foot crane's-bill	Geranium molle	OV5
Wood crane's-bill	Geranium sylvaticum	MG3
Water avens	Geum rivale	MG2, W3
Yellow horned-poppy	Glaucium flavum	SD1
Common rock-rose	Helianthemum nummularium	CG5
Common hogweed	Heracleum sphondylium	MG2
Mouse-ear hawkweed	Hieracium pilosella	CG1, CG2, CG5, CG7
Sea sandwort	Honkenya peploides	SD2
Common cat's-ear	Hypochaeris radicata	H7
Meadow vetchling	Lathyrus pratensis	MG4
Autumn hawkbit	Leontodon autumnalis	MG4, MG8
Rough hawkbit	Leontodon hispidus	CG2, CG5, CG7
Scots lovage	Ligusticum scoticum	MC2
Fairy flax	Linum catharticum	CG2
Honeysuckle	Lonicera periclymenum	W10
Bird's-foot trefoil	Lotus corniculatus	MG5, CG1, CG2, CG3, CG5, CG6, H7
Bog pimpernel	Lysimachia tenella (syn. Anagallis tenella)	H5
Sea mayweed	Matricaria maritima	MC6, SD3
Bogbean	Menyanthes trifoliata	M1
Dog's mercury	Mercurialis perennis	MG2, W8, W9
Wood-sorrel	Oxalis acetosella	W9, W11
Pellitory-of-the-wall	Parietaria diffusa	OV41
Buck's-horn plantain	Plantago coronopus)	MC5, MC10
Ribwort plantain	Plantago lanceolata	MG3, MG4, MG5, CG1, CG2, CG3, H7, MC10, CG10
Sea plantain	Plantago maritima	H7, MC10
Knotgrass	Polygonum aviculare	OV4
Silverweed	Potentilla anserina	MG11, SD17
Tormentil	Potentilla erecta	W11, H4, H5, H7, CG10, H10, H15, H21
Self-heal	Prunella vulgaris	CG10
Meadow buttercup	Ranunculus acris	MG3, MG4, MG8
Creeping buttercup	Ranunculus repens	MG10
Roseroot	Rhodiola rosea	MC3
Cloudberry	Rubus chamaemorus	H22
Bramble	Rubus fruticosus agg.	W8, W10
Common sorrel	Rumex acetosa	MG3, MG4, MG8, MC3, MC12
Curled dock	Rumex crispus	SD1
Procumbent pearlwort	Sagina procumbens	OV20
Annual species of glasswort	Salicornia spp.	SM10
Salad burnet	Sanguisorba minor	CG1, CG2, CG3, CG5
Great burnet	Sanguisorba officinalis)	MG3, MG4
Small scabious	Scabiosa columbaria	CG2
Biting stonecrop	Sedum acre	MC5
English stonecrop	Sedum anglicum	MC5
Groundsel	Senecio vulgaris	OV5
Saw-wort	Serratula tinctoria	H5
Red campion	Silene dioica	MG2
Corn spurrey	Spergula arvensis	OV4, OV5
Greater sea-spurrey	Spergularia rupicola	MC1
Common chickweed	Stellaria media	MC7, OV5
Annual sea-blite	Suaeda maritima	SM10
Devil's-bit scabious	Succisa pratensis	H5
Dandelion	Taraxacum officinale agg.	MG4, CG6
Wild thyme	Thymus praecox	CG1, CG2, CG5, CG7, H7, CG10
Large thyme	Thymus pulegioides	CG7
Red clover	Trifolium pratense)	MG4, MG5
White clover	Trifolium repens)	MG3, MG4, MG5, MG6, MG8
Common gorse	Ulex europaeus	H6
Western gorse	Ulex gallii	H4, H5, H6, H8
Dwarf gorse	Ulex minor	H2, H3
Stinging nettle	Urtica dioica	MG2
Bilberry	Vaccinium myrtillus	H12, H18, H19, H20, H21, H22
Cowberry	Vaccinium vitis-idaea	H16, H19, H22
Marsh valerian	Valeriana dioica	W3
Common valerian	Valeriana officinalis	MG2
Common dog-violet	Viola riviniana	W9, W11, H6, CG10

=== Other monocotyledons ===
English name	Scientific name	Communities
Bluebell	Hyacinthoides non-scripta	MC12
Broad-leaved pondweed	Potamogeton natans	A9
Spring squill	Scilla verna	H7
Narrow-leaved eelgrass	Zostera angustifolia	SM1
Eelgrass	Zostera marina	SM1
Dwarf eelgrass	Zostera noltei	SM1

=== Ferns ===
English name	Scientific name	Communities
Wall-rue	Asplenium ruta-muraria	OV39
Maidenhair spleenwort	Asplenium trichomanes	OV39
Hard fern	Blechnum spicant	H21
Male fern	Dryopteris filix-mas	W9, MG2
Bracken	Pteridium aquilinum	W10, W11

=== Clubmosses ===
English name	Scientific name	Communities
Fir clubmoss	Huperzia selago	H17

== Bryophytes ==
=== Mosses ===
English name	Scientific name	Communities
Pointed spear-moss	Calliergon cuspidatum	W3, SD17
Yellow starry feather-moss	Campylium stellatum	H5
Broom fork-moss	Dicranum scoparium sensu lato	H1, H12, H16, H18, H21, H22
Common feather-moss	Eurhynchium praelongum	W8, W9
Common striated feather-moss	Eurhynchium striatum	W9
Swartz's feather-moss	Eurhynchium swartzii	MG2
Silky wall feather-moss	Homalothecium sericeum	OV39
Glittering wood-moss	Hylocomium splendens	CG10, W11, H16, H20, H21, H22
Cypress-leaved plait-moss and allied species	Hypnum cupressiforme sensu lato	H1, CG7, H14, H15, H21
Heath plait-moss	Hypnum jutlandicum	H12, H16
Swan's-neck thyme-moss	Mnium hornum	W3
Hart's-tongue thyme-moss	Plagiomnium undulatum	MG2, W9
Dented silk-moss	Plagiothecium denticulatum	MG2
Waved silk-moss	Plagiothecium undulatum	H21
	Pleurozium schreberi	H12, H16, H18, H20, H21, H22
Nodding thread-moss	Pohlia nutans	H9
Common haircap	Polytrichum commune	M4, U6
Neat feather-moss	Pseudoscleropodium purum	W11, CG6
Woolly fringe-moss	Racomitrium lanuginosum	H13, H14, H15, H17, H19, H20
Little shaggy-moss	Rhytidiadelphus loreus	H20, H21, H22
Springy turf-moss	Rhytidiadelphus squarrosus	W11
Dotted thyme-moss	Rhizomnium punctatum	W3
Seaside grimmia	Schistidium maritimum	MC2
Cow-horn bog-moss	Sphagnum auriculatum	M1
Acute-leaved bog-moss	Sphagnum capillifolium	H21, H22
Feathery bog-moss	Sphagnum cuspidatum	M1, M2, M4
Flat-topped / flexuous bog-mosses	Sphagnum recurvum	M2, M4
Common tamarisk-moss	Thuidium tamariscinum	W9, W11

=== Liverworts ===
English name	Scientific name	Communities
Bifid crestwort	Lophocolea bidentata sensu lato	MG2, U6
Purple spoonwort	Pleurozia purpurea	H15
Wall scalewort	Porella platyphylla	OV39

== Lichens ==
English name	Scientific name	Communities
	Alectoria nigricans	H13
Iceland moss	Cetraria islandica	H13, H19
	Cladonia arbuscula	H13, H14, H17, H19, H22
	Cladonia impexa	H16
Reindeer lichen	Cladonia rangiferina	H13
	Cladonia uncialis	H15, H17, H19, H20
	Cornicularia aculeata	SD11, H13
