= Shingle, strandline and sand-dune communities in the British National Vegetation Classification system =

UK plant community type

This article gives an overview of the shingle, strandline and sand-dune communities in the British National Vegetation Classification system.

== Introduction ==
The shingle, strandline and sand-dune communities of the NVC were described in Volume 5 of British Plant Communities, first published in 2000, along with the other maritime communities (those of saltmarshes and maritime cliffs) and vegetation of open habitats.

In total, 19 shingle, strandline and sand-dune communities have been identified.

The shingle, strandline and sand-dune communities consist of a single community found on coastal shingle (SD1), two communities associated with strandlines (SD2 and SD3), and sixteen sand-dune communities.

The sand-dune communities fall into the following four groups:

- six foredune and mobile dune communities (SD4, SD5, SD6, SD7, SD10 and SD19)
- four fixed-dune grasslands (SD8, SD9, SD11 and SD12)
- five dune-slack communities (SD13, SD14, SD15, SD16 and SD17)
- one dune scrub community, SD18

=== Other communities occurring on sand-dunes ===
There are a number of other communities which occur on sand-dunes, but are not classified as sand-dune communities within the NVC. Those listed in British Plant Communities are as follows:

- Maritime cliff communities MC5 and MC6
- Open vegetation communities OV4 and OV27
- Mesotrophic grassland communities MG8, MG10 and MG11
- Swamp communities S4 and S19
- Mire communities M15 and M16
- Heath community H11

== List of shingle, strandline and sand-dune communities ==
The following is a list of the communities that make up this category:

- SD1 Rumex crispus - Glaucium flavum shingle community
- SD2 Honkenya peploides - Cakile maritima strandline community
- SD3 Matricaria maritima - Galium aparine strandline community
- SD4 Elymus farctus ssp. boreali-atlanticus foredune community
- SD5 Leymus arenarius mobile dune community
- SD6 Ammophila arenaria mobile dune community
- SD7 Ammophila arenaria - Festuca rubra semi-fixed dune community
- SD8 Festuca rubra - Galium verum fixed dune grassland
- SD9 Ammophila arenaria - Arrhenatherum elatius dune grassland
- SD10 Carex arenaria dune community
- SD11 Carex arenaria - Cornicularia aculeata dune community
- SD12 Carex arenaria - Festuca ovina - Agrostis capillaris dune grassland
- SD13 Sagina nodosa - Bryum pseudotriquetrum dune-slack community
- SD14 Salix repens - Campylium stellatum dune-slack community
- SD15 Salix repens - Calliergon cuspidatum dune-slack community
- SD16 Salix repens - Holcus lanatus dune-slack community
- SD17 Potentilla anserina - Carex nigra dune-slack community
- SD18 Hippophae rhamnoides dune scrub
- SD19 Phleum arenarium - Arenaria serpyllifolia dune annual community Tortulo-Phleetum arenariae (Massart 1908) Br.-Bl. & de Leeuw 1936
