= British NVC community H5 =

UK plant community type

NVC community H5 (Erica vagans - Schoenus nigricans heath) is one of the heath communities in the British National Vegetation Classification system. It is one of three communities which are considered transitional between the lowland dry heaths and the wetter communities classified in the NVC as mires.

It is a very localised community. There are two subcommunities.

== Community composition ==
The following constant species are found in this community:

- Flea Sedge (Carex pulicaris)
- Cross-leaved Heath (Erica tetralix)
- Cornish Heath (Erica vagans)
- Sheep's Fescue (Festuca ovina)
- Bog pimpernel (Lysimachia tenella, syn. Anagallis tenella)
- Purple Moor-grass (Molinia caerulea)
- Tormentil (Potentilla erecta)
- Black Bog-rush (Schoenus nigricans)
- Saw-wort (Serratula tinctoria)
- Devil's-bit Scabious (Succisa pratensis)
- Western Gorse (Ulex gallii)
- Yellow Starry Feather-moss (Campylium stellatum)

The following rare species are associated with the community:

- Bristle Bent (Agrostis curtisii)
- Cornish Heath (Erica vagans)
- Spring Squill (Scilla verna)

== Distribution ==
This community is confined to The Lizard peninsula in Cornwall.

== Subcommunities ==
There are two subcommunities:

- the so-called typical subcommunity
- the Eriocharis multicaulis subcommunity
