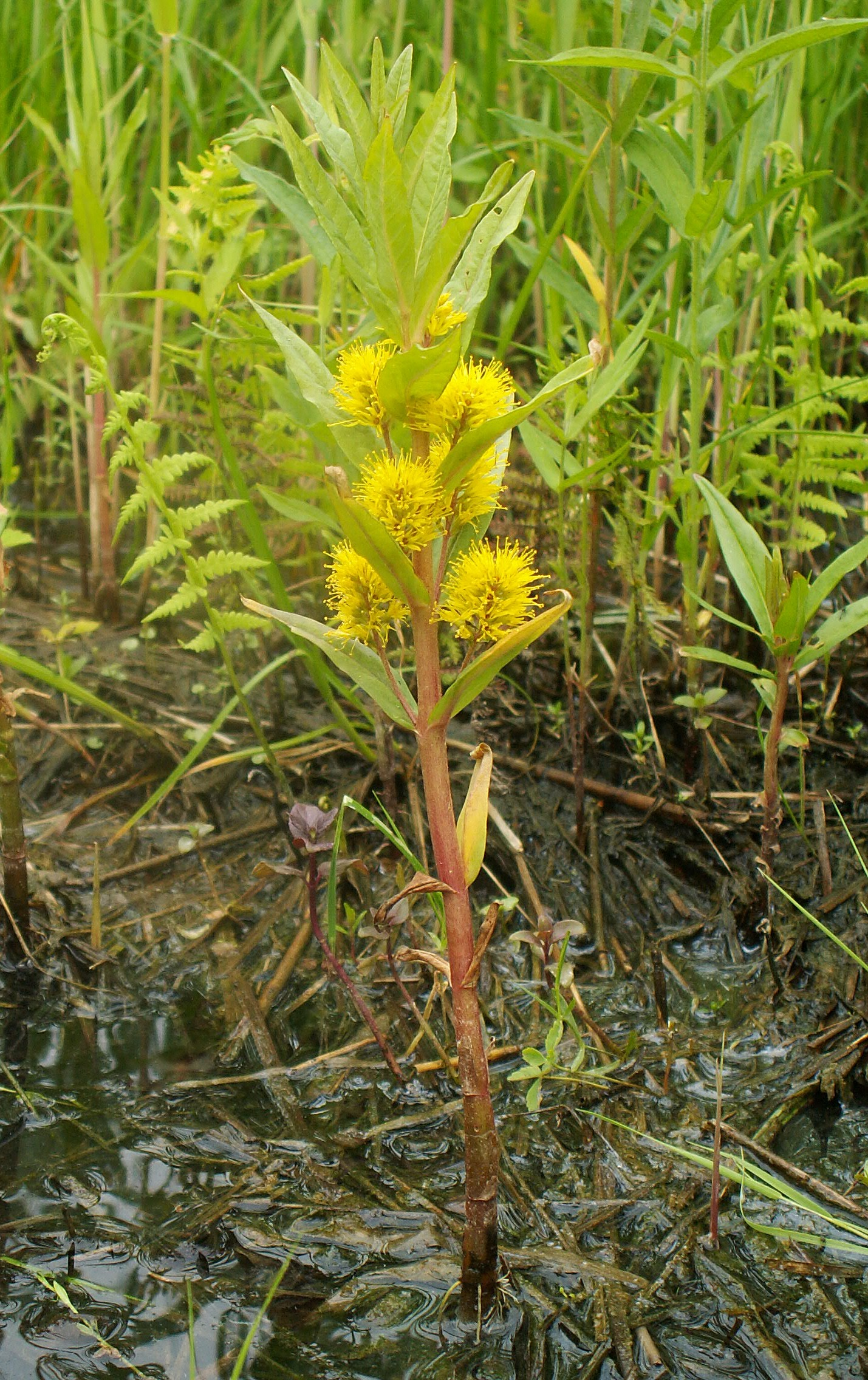

Conservation status
- Least Concern (IUCN 3.1)

- Secure (NatureServe)

Scientific classification
- Kingdom: Plantae
- Clade: Embryophytes
- Clade: Tracheophytes
- Clade: Spermatophytes
- Clade: Angiosperms
- Clade: Eudicots
- Clade: Asterids
- Order: Ericales
- Family: Primulaceae
- Genus: Lysimachia
- Species: L. thyrsiflora

Binomial name
- Lysimachia thyrsiflora L.

Synonyms
- Lysimachusa thyrsiflora (L.) Pohl; Naumburgia guttata Moench; Naumburgia thyrsiflora (L.) Duby; Naumburgia thyrsiflora (L.) Rchb.; Nummularia thyrsiflora (L.) Kuntze

= Lysimachia thyrsiflora =

Species of flowering plant in the primrose family

Lysimachia thyrsiflora, the tufted loosestrife, is a plant in the genus Lysimachia. It is native to large sections of the northern Northern Hemisphere, including Eurasia and North America. It often grows in marshes, shorelines of lakes and ponds and occasionally along streams. It is an erect perennial herb growing up to 80 centimeters (31 in) tall and bearing yellow flowers, sometimes dotted with purple. It may be confused with purple loosestrife when not blooming but can be easily distinguished because purple loosestrife has a square stem. Tufted loosestrife has been used medicinally in Asia to combat high blood pressure.

It is a rare species in Britain, where it is found in Salix cinerea - Galium palustre wet woodland (community W1 of the British National Vegetation Classification system), Salix pentandra - Carex rostrata wet woodland (NVC community W3) and Carex rostrata - Sphagnum recurvum mire (community M4).
