= S. fallax =

S. fallax may refer to:

- Sida fallax, the ʻilima in Hawaiian, a flowering plant species found in the Pacific Islands
- Sphagnum fallax, a moss species
