= British NVC community SD19 =

UK plant community type

NVC community SD19 (Phleum arenarium - Arenaria serpyllifolia dune annual community) is one of the 16 sand-dune communities in the British National Vegetation Classification system. It is one of six communities associated with foredunes and mobile dunes.

It is a widespread coastal community. There are no subcommunities.

== Community composition ==
The community has five constant species:

- Marram (Ammophila arenaria)
- Thyme-leaved sandwort (Arenaria serpyllifolia)
- Sand sedge (Carex arenaria)
- Red fescue (Festuca rubra)
- Sand cat's-tail (Phleum arenarium)

Two rare species, Early sand-grass (Mibora minima) and Dune fescue (Vulpia membranacea), are associated with this community.

== Distribution ==
This community is widespread but scarce on British coastlines; it is more common in England and Wales than in Scotland, where it has to date only been found at a single site in the southwest.
