= British NVC community H6 =

UK plant community type

NVC community H6 (Erica vagans - Ulex europaeus heath) is one of the heath communities in the British National Vegetation Classification system. It is one of five communities categorised as lowland dry heaths.

It has a very localised distribution in southern England. There are four subcommunities.

== Community composition ==
The following constant species are found in this community:

- Brown Bent (Agrostis vinealis)
- Glaucous Sedge (Carex flacca)
- Bell Heather (Erica cinerea)
- Cornish Heath (Erica vagans)
- Meadowsweet (Filipendula ulmaria)
- Common Gorse (Ulex europaeus)
- Western Gorse (Ulex gallii)
- Common Dog-violet (Viola riviniana)

A number of rare species are associated with the community: Bristle Bent (Agrostis curtisii), Chives (Allium schoenoprasum), Cornish Heath (Erica vagans), Dwarf Rush (Juncus capitatus), Spring Squill (Scilla verna) and Twin-headed Clover (Trifolium bocconei).

== Distribution ==
This community is confined to The Lizard peninsula in Cornwall.

== Subcommunities ==
There are four subcommunities:

- the so-called typical subcommunity
- the Festuca ovina subcommunity
- the Agrostis curtisii subcommunity
- the Molinia caerulea subcommunity
