= British NVC community M4 =

UK plant community type

NVC community M4 (Carex rostrata - Sphagnum recurvum mire) is one of the mire communities in the British National Vegetation Classification system.

It is a localised community of northern and western Britain. There are no subcommunities.

== Community composition ==
The following constant species are found in this community:

- Bottle Sedge (Carex rostrata)
- Common Haircap (Polytrichum commune)
- Feathery Bog-moss (Sphagnum cuspidatum)
- Flat-topped / Flexuous Bog-mosses S. recurvum

Two rare species are associated with the community:

- String Sedge (Carex chordorrhiza)
- Tufted Loosestrife (Lysimachia thrysiflora)

== Distribution ==
This community is found in Cornwall and in various locations in Wales, northern England and Scotland.
