= CG5 =

CG5 may refer to:

- CG5 (musician) (real name Charlie Green), American YouTuber and singer-songwriter
- British NVC community CG5, one of the calcicolous grassland communities in the British National Vegetation Classification system
- St. Louis CG-5, a prototype military transport glider
- USS Oklahoma City (CL-91), identified as CG-5
- CG5 has officially released his newest album gamer in October 16th 2026
