= British NVC community MC1 =

UK plant community type

British NVC community MC1 (Crithmum maritimum - Spergularia rupicola maritime rock-crevice community) is one of the maritime cliff communities in the British National Vegetation Classification system. It is one of five communities categorised as maritime cliff crevice and ledge communities.

This community is found locally in coastal areas of western and southern Britain . There are three subcommunities.

== Community composition ==
Four constant species are found in this community:

- Rock Samphire (Crithmum maritimum)
- Greater Sea-spurrey (Spergularia rupicola)
- Red Fescue (Festuca rubra)
- Thrift (Armeria maritima)

At least two rare species are associated with this community, Curved Hard-grass (Parapholis incurva), and the Rock Sea-lavender (Limonium recurvum). Other members of the Limonium binervosum complex may also occur.

== Distribution ==
This community is found in coastal areas on the west coast of Britain, with the greatest concentrations on the western coasts of Wales, and in Devon and Cornwall. Outlying stands exist on the English south coast in Dorset and Kent, and in southwest Scotland.

== Subcommunities ==
There are three subcommunities:

- the so-called typical subcommunity
- the Inula crithmoides subcommunity
- the Rayed Aster tripolium subcommunity
