= Heaths in the British National Vegetation Classification system =

UK plant community type

This article gives an overview of the heath communities in the British National Vegetation Classification system.

== Introduction ==
The heath communities of the NVC were described, along with the mire communities, in Volume 2 of British Plant Communities, first published in 1991.

In total, 22 heath communities have been identified.

The heath communities consist of six separate subgroups:

- five lowland dry heath communities, all with distinct, largely non-overlapping distributions in England and Wales (H1, H2, H6, H8 and H9)
- three localised communities, with non-overlapping ranges in southern England, which are considered transitional between the above and the wetter communities classified in the NVC as mires (H3, H4 and H5)
- two maritime heath communities, found exclusively on the coasts of northern and western Britain; one (H7) is more widespread than the other (H11)
- four submontane heaths from upland areas in northern and western Britain; two of these (H10 and H12) are widespread, whereas the other two (H16 and H21) are more localised (confined to Scotland, and Scotland and the Lake District, respectively)
- two sub-alpine communities, considered transitional between the previous and next groupings - H18, which is widespread in northern and western Britain), and H22, which is confined to Scotland
- six montane heath communities with lichens and mosses, all of which are confined either to Scotland (H13, H14, H15, H17 and H20) or to Scotland and the Lake District (H19)

== List of heath communities ==
The following is a list of the communities that make up this category:

- H1 Calluna vulgaris - Festuca ovina heath
- H2 Calluna vulgaris - Ulex minor heath
- H3 Ulex minor - Agrostis curtisii heath
- H4 Ulex gallii - Agrostis curtisii heath
- H5 Erica vagans - Schoenus nigricans heath
- H6 Erica vagans - Ulex europaeus heath
- H7 Calluna vulgaris - Scilla verna heath
- H8 Calluna vulgaris - Ulex gallii heath
- H9 Calluna vulgaris - Deschampsia flexuosa heath
- H10 Calluna vulgaris - Erica cinerea heath
- H11 Calluna vulgaris - Carex arenaris heath
- H12 Calluna vulgaris - Vaccinium myrtillus heath
- H13 Calluna vulgaris - Cladonia arbuscula heath
- H14 Calluna vulgaris - Racomitrium lanuginosum heath
- H15 Calluna vulgaris - Juniperus communis ssp. nana heath
- H16 Calluna vulgaris - Arctostaphylos uva-ursi heath
- H17 Calluna vulgaris - Arctostaphylos alpinus heath
- H18 Vaccinium myrtillus - Deschampsia flexuosa heath
- H19 Vaccinium myrtillus - Cladonia arbuscula heath
- H20 Vaccinium myrtillus - Racomitrium lanuginosum heath
- H21 Calluna vulgaris - Vaccinium myrtillus - Sphagnum capillifolium heath
- H22 Vaccinium myrtillus - Rubus chamaemorus heath

== Sources ==
- Rodwell, J. S. (1988) British Plant Communities Volume 2 - Mires and heaths ISBN 0-521-62720-6 pages vii, 347 - 358
