= British NVC community M2 =

UK plant community type

NVC community M2 (Sphagnum cuspidatum/recurvum bog pool community) is one of the mire communities in the British National Vegetation Classification system.

It is a fairly widely distributed community in northern western Britain, and is also found in Norfolk. There are two subcommunities.

== Community composition ==
The following constant species are found in this community:

- Cross-leaved heath (Erica tetralix)
- Common cottongrass (Eriophorum angustifolium)
- Round-leaved sundew (Drosera rotundifolia)
- Feathery bog-moss (Sphagnum cuspidatum)
- Flat-topped / flexuous bog-mosses (S. recurvum)

Three rare species are associated with the community:

- Bog-rosemary (Andromeda polifolia)
- Tall bog-sedge (Carex magellanica)
- Golden bog-moss (Sphagnum pulchrum)

== Distribution ==
This community is found in various locations in Wales, southern and northeastern Scotland, and northern England, with an outpost in Norfolk.

== Subcommunities ==
There are two subcommunities:

- the Rhynchospora alba subcommunity
- the Sphagnum recurvum subcommunity
