= British NVC community SD1 =

UK plant community type

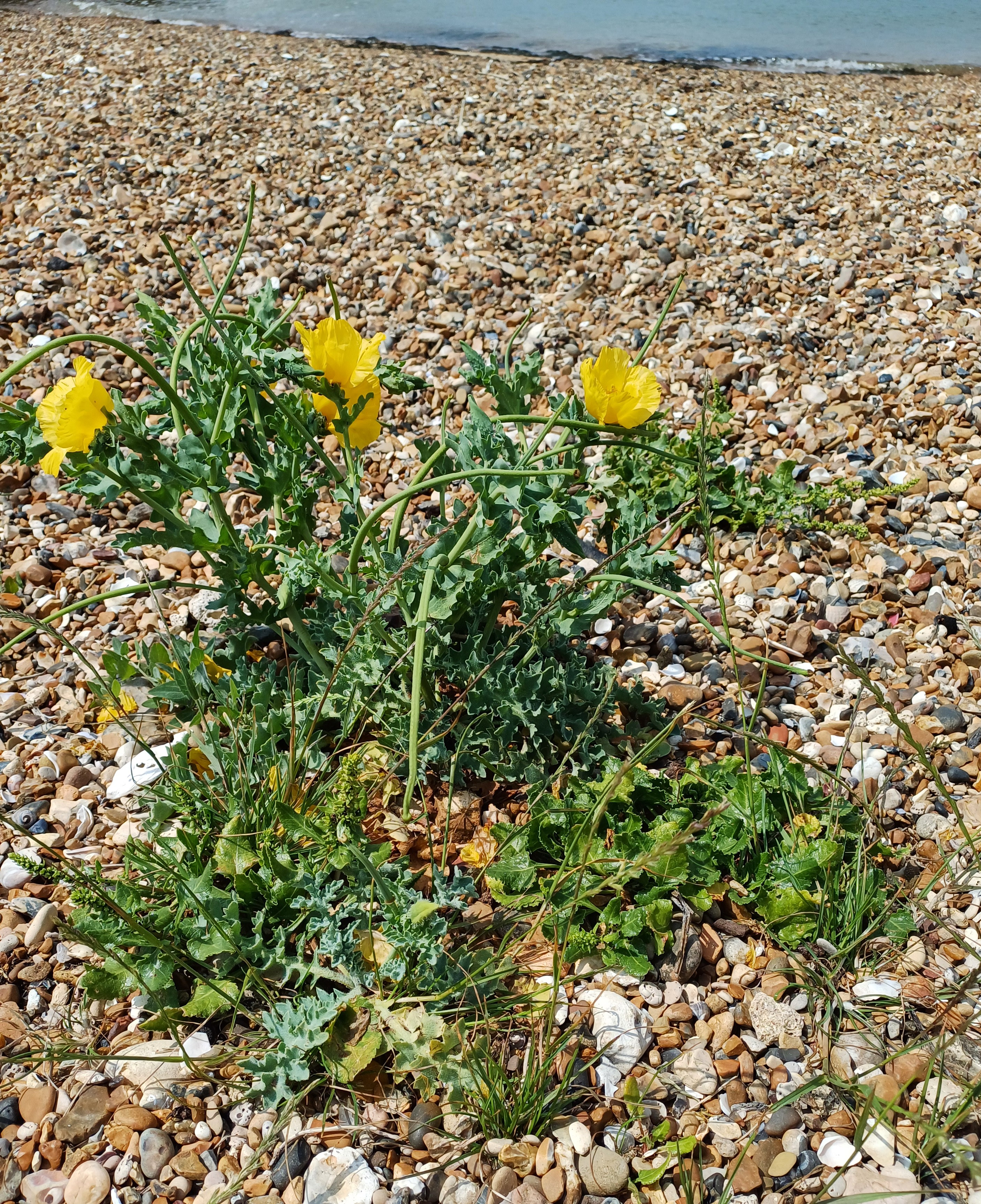
SD1 yellow horned-poppy vegetation on the beach at Whitstable, Kent

NVC community SD1 (Rumex crispus - Glaucium flavum shingle community) is a shingle plant community in the British National Vegetation Classification system. It is formed of plants that are adapted to survive the harsh conditions of mobile shingle and periodic inundation by seawater, and is found throughout the coastline of England and Wales, extending into parts of Scotland, where it is largely replaced by SD3 Matricaria maritima vegetation.

== Description ==
SD1 Rumex crispus-Glaucium flavum community was conceived as the only type of vegetation on shingle beaches throughout most of England and Wales. Towards the northern half of England and in Scotland it is increasingly replaced by the more species-poor SD3 Matricaria maritima-Galium aparine strandline community. SD1 is characterised by the presence of curled dock (especially the subspecies littoreus (J. Hardy) Akeroyd), yellow horned-poppy and (although it is rare) sea kale. Other common associates include sea beet, sea campion, sea mayweed and perennial-, smooth- and prickly sow-thistles.

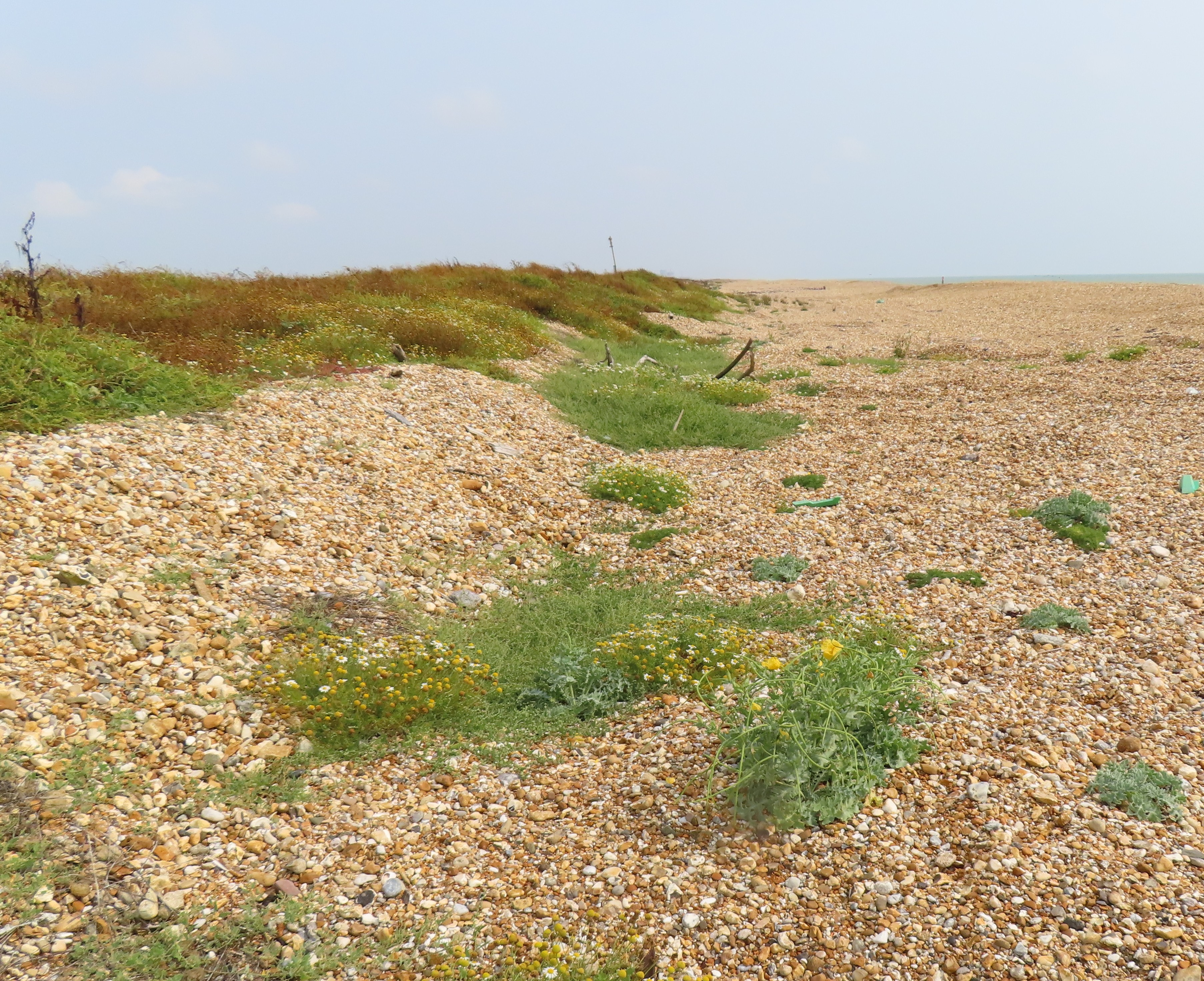
SD1 vegetation on the beach at Dungeness, Kent

Shingle beaches are a hostile environment for the establishment of plants, and SD1 is generally described as a pioneer community, although it is not subject to succession. The vegetation is exposed to the stresses of salinity, wind, sunshine, drought and, especially on the lower parts of beaches, wave disturbance. Factors favouring the establishment of plants include the presence of sand and fine particles within the shingle matrix (because they retain fresh water) and the formation of humic soil from the decomposition of stranded seaweed and other organic debris, which creates a substrate that is rich in nitrogen.

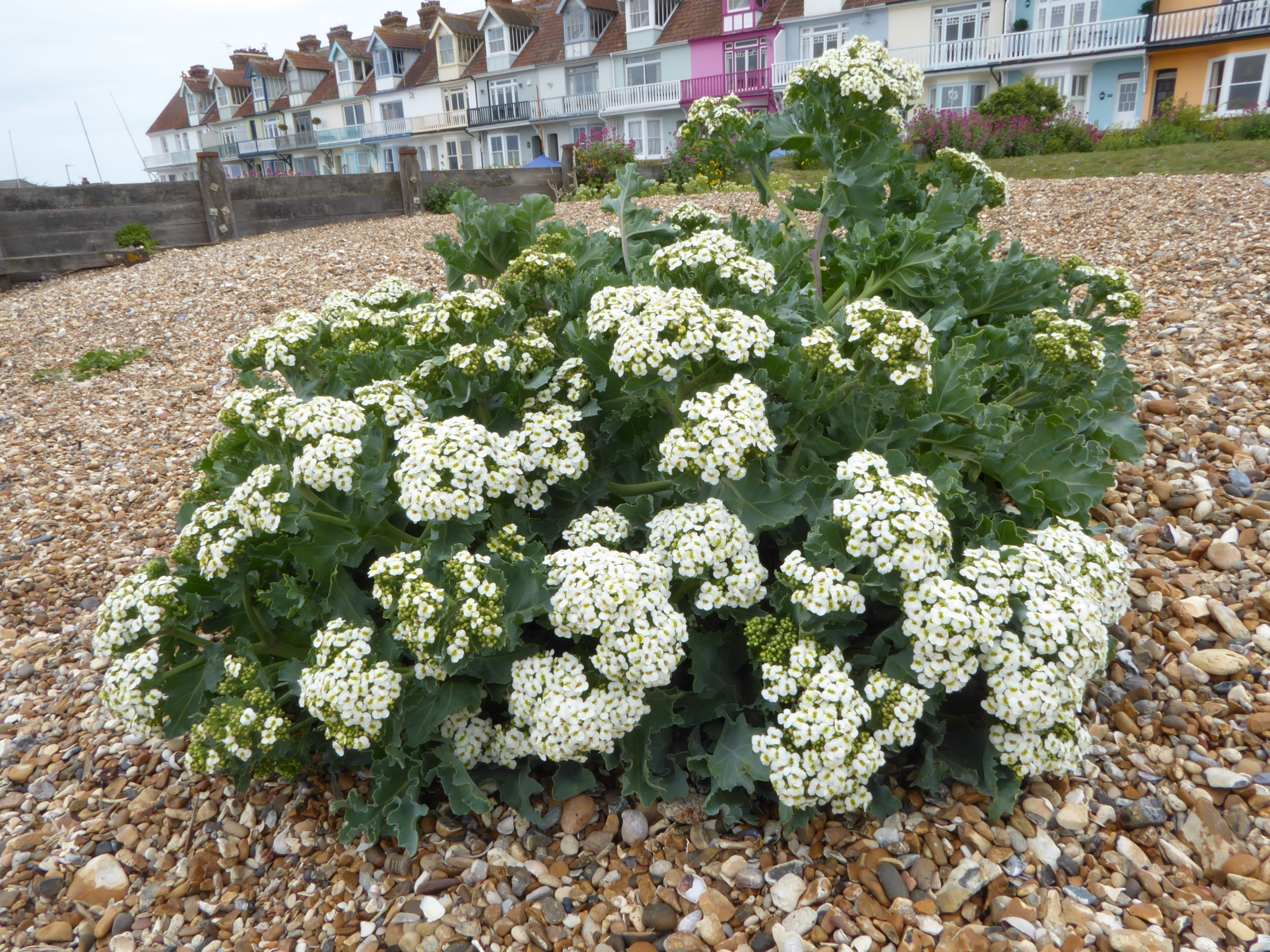
Sea kale is one of the most successful colonisers of coastal shingle.

There are usually no plants that live below the average monthly spring tide line on a beach, due to wave disturbance and inundation by salt water, but shingle vegetation often begins at around the spring high tide line, because plants can have up to six months to grow there before being destroyed by equinoctial tidal surges. The pioneer plants that occur in this most vulnerable zone include Babington's orache, frosted orache, prickly saltwort and sea kale. The first three are all annuals, which flower and fruit before the autumn, but the latter is a tough-stemmed perennial which is adapted to survive being buried under fresh shingle in the winter. Where a beach is interrupted by a natural cliff or flood defences below the spring high tide line, there is usually no vegetation whatsoever.

Tansley describes how, where there is a shingle ridge along the shore, it is the landward, or back, side of the ridge that is most important for the characteristic coastal vegetation. There is fresh water in the upper part of a ridge, in the interstices between the stones, which derives from rainwater or dew formation, and this is sufficient to maintain the plants throughout the summer.

The analogous habitats in Europe, under the Habitats Directive, are 1210 Annual vegetation of strand lines and 1220 perennial vegetation of shingle banks. These are both listed on Annex 1 of the directive, to which Britain is a signatory, meaning that they must be protected through the designation of Special Areas of Conservation (Natura 2000) sites. Thirteen such sites have been nominated in the UK, of which four (Chesil Beach, Dungeness, Minsmere and Orford Ness) are primarily for the protection of habitat 1210 and nine have it as a qualifying feature.

== Distribution ==
This community is found in many places on the south and east coasts of England, from Norfolk to Dorset, and also in scattered localities in the Isles of Scilly, Wales, northwest England and southwest Scotland.

== Subcommunities ==
There are two subcommunities for SD1: the SD1a typical subcommunity is as described above, whereas the SD1b Lathyrus japonicus subcommunity is distinguished mainly by the presence of sea pea, which is an uncommon plant on beaches in the south of England.

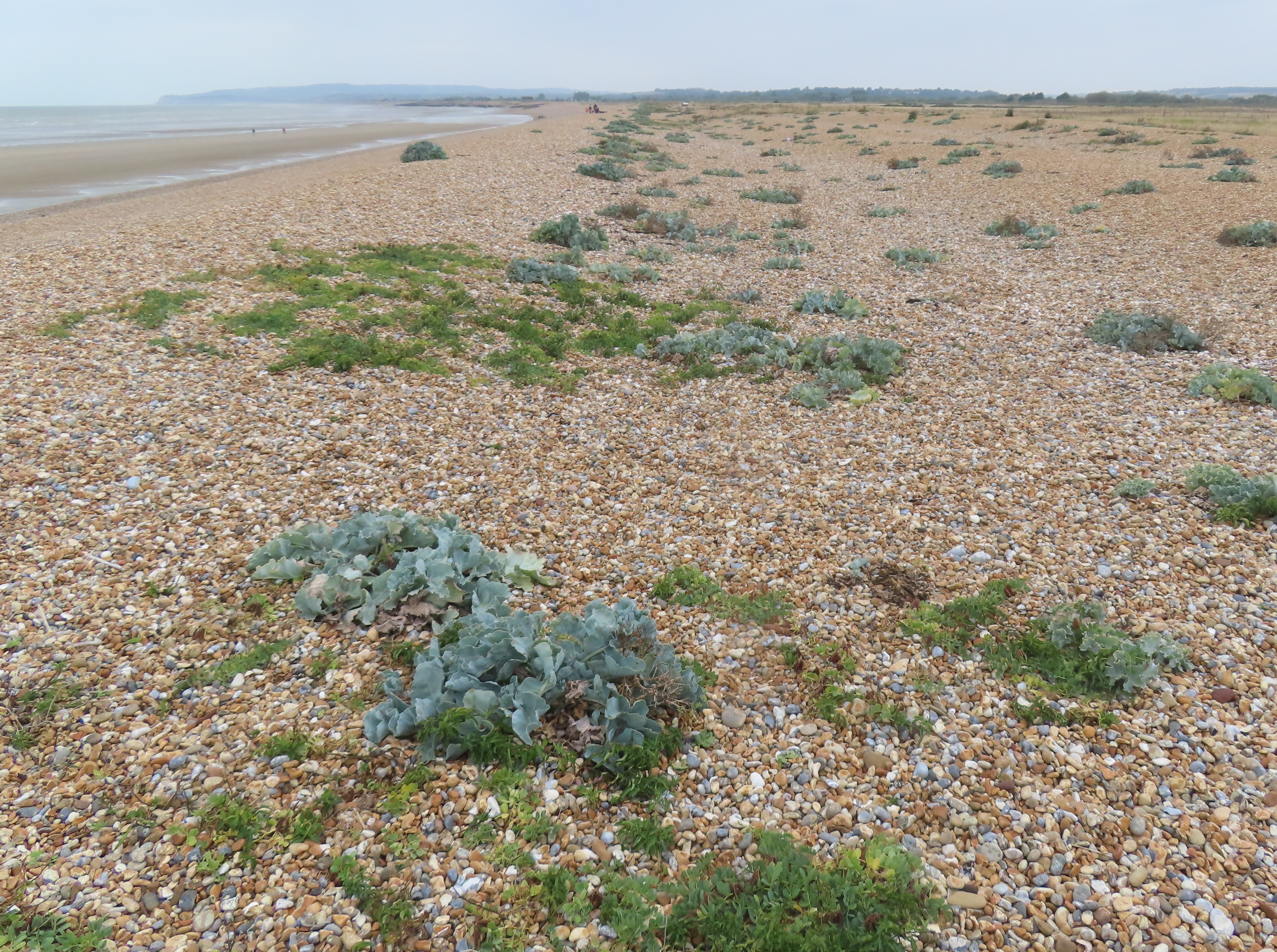
SD1b Lathyrus japonicus vegetation at Rye Harbour, Sussex

== Other treatments ==
Since before the original account of SD1 was even published (in 2000), it has been apparent that shingle beach communities in southern Britain are not all adequately described as this. In particular, strandlines rich in various species of goosefoot (Atriplex spp.) do not seem to be mentioned; although they are potentially covered by the Scottish equivalent, SD3 Matricaria maritima vegetation. A review of the NVC in 2000 concluded that an additional community, related perhaps to MC6 seabird cliffs, might be needed. Some authors have subsequently taken to describing shingle strandline vegetation as MC6.

An alternative classification of vegetated shingle was developed by Pippa Sneddon and Roland Randall in 1993. This contains 25 communities ranging from scrub through grassland to the more open shingle community types represented by SD1. It runs parallel to the NVC and is not easily translated to that system. It does not include the vegetation of Dungeness, which is described in a separate study by Brian Ferry, Ned Lodge and Stephen Waters. Neither of these alternative systems is widely used in describing or monitoring coastal habitats.

Whereas English beaches are often composed of flint cobbles eroded from the chalk cliffs, the extent of this habitat in France is much less owing to the direction of the sea currents. The most notable exception is at Cayeux-sur-Mer, where there is a huge shingle foreland formed from the eroding chalk cliffs. Shingle beaches elsewhere in Europe tend to be made of other types of rock, such as granite or silica, but they have similar vegetation. In Brittany, the closest analogue to SD1 may be the shell beach in Mont-Saint-Michel Bay, which has Ray's knotgrass and Babington's Orache.

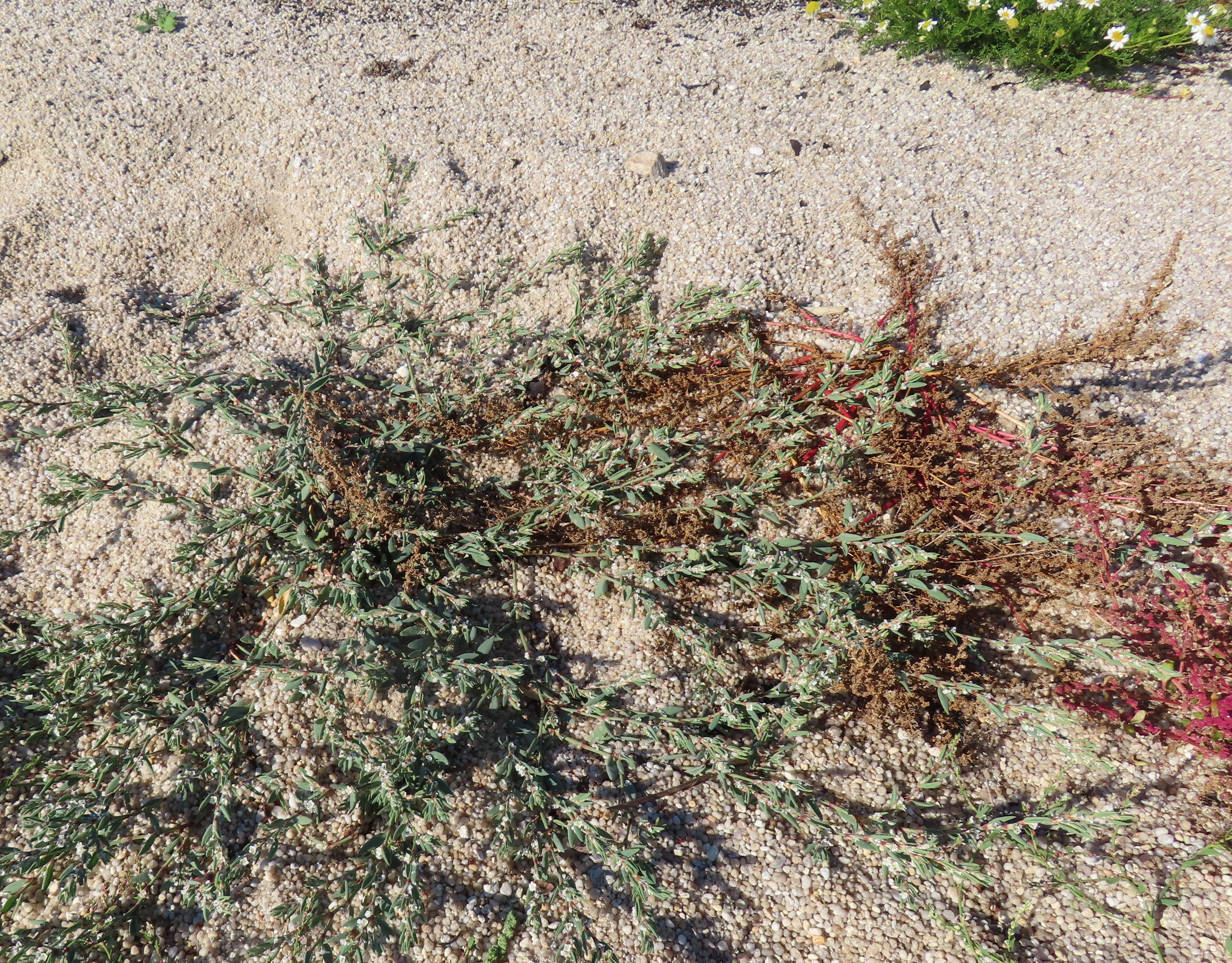
Sea knotgrass growing on fine shingle on Kerouini Plage, Cornouaille
