= British NVC community MG3 =

UK plant community type

British NVC community MG3 (Anthoxanthum odoratum - Geranium sylvaticum grassland) is one of the mesotrophic grassland communities in the British National Vegetation Classification system. It is one of four such communities associated with well-drained permanent pastures and meadows.

This community is a localised community of northern England. There are three subcommunities.

== Community composition ==
The following constant species are found in this community:

- Common Bent (Agrostris capillaris)
- The lady's-mantle (Alchemilla glabra)
- Sweet Vernal-grass (Anthoxanthum odoratum)
- Common Mouse-ear (Cerastium fontanum)
- Pignut (Conopodium majus)
- Cock's-foot (Dactylis glomerata)
- Red Fescue (Festuca rubra)
- Wood Crane's-bill (Geranium sylvaticum)
- Yorkshire-fog (Holcus lanatus)
- Ribwort Plantain (Plantago lanceolata)
- Rough Meadow-grass (Poa trivialis)
- Meadow Buttercup (Ranunculus acris)
- Common Sorrel (Rumex acetosa)
- Great Burnet (Sanguisorba officinalis)
- White Clover (Trifolium repens)

Five rare species of lady's-mantle Alchemilla are associated with this community: A. acutiloba, A. glomerulans, A. monticola, A. subcrenata and A. wichurae.

== Distribution ==
This community, although widespread in the past, is now almost confined to a few upland valleys in County Durham, North Yorkshire and Cumbria.

== Subcommunities ==
There are three subcommunities:

- the Bromus hordaceus ssp. hordaceus subcommunity
- the Briza media subcommunity
- the Arrhenatherum elatius subcommunity
