= British NVC community H3 =

UK plant community type

NVC community H3 (Ulex minor - Agrostis curtisii heath) is one of the heath communities in the British National Vegetation Classification system. It is one of three communities which are considered transitional between the lowland dry heaths and the wetter communities classified in the NVC as mires.

It is a very localised community. There are three subcommunities.

== Community composition ==
The following constant species are found in this community:

- Bristle Bent (Agrostis curtisii)
- Heather (Calluna vulgaris)
- Bell Heather (Erica cinerea)
- Cross-leaved Heath (Erica tetralix)
- Purple Moor-grass (Molinia caerulea)
- Dwarf Gorse (Ulex minor)

The following rare species are associated with the community:

- Bristle Bent (Agrostis curtisii)
- Dorset Heath (Erica ciliaris)
- Pale Dog-violet (Viola lactea)

== Distribution ==
This community is confined to Hampshire and southern Dorset.

== Subcommunities ==
There are three subcommunities:

- the so-called typical subcommunity
- the Cladonia spp. subcommunity
- the Agrostis curtisii subcommunity
