= British NVC community CG6 =

UK plant community type

NVC community CG6 (Avenula pubescens grassland) is one of the calcicolous grassland communities in the British National Vegetation Classification system. It is one of four communities of rank, tussocky grassland associated with low levels of grazing, within the lowland calcicolous grassland group.

It is a comparatively widely distributed community. There are two subcommunities.

== Community composition ==
The following constant species are found in this community:

- Meadow Oat-grass (Avenula pratensis)
- Downy Oat-grass (Avenula pubescens)
- Red Fescue (Festuca rubra)
- Common Bird's-foot-trefoil (Lotus corniculatus)
- Dandelion (Taraxacum officinale agg.)
- Neat Feather-moss Pseudoscleropodium purum

No rare species are associated with this community.

== Distribution ==
This community is found in lowland limestone grassland throughout England.

== Subcommunities ==
There are two subcommunities:

- the Dactylis glomerata - Briza media subcommunity
- the Potentilla reptans - Tragopogon pratensis subcommunity
