= British NVC community MC4 =

UK plant community type

British NVC community MC4 (Brassica oleracea maritime cliff-ledge community) is one of the maritime cliff communities in the British National Vegetation Classification system. It is one of five communities categorised as maritime cliff crevice and ledge communities.

This community is found locally on the south coast of England. There are two subcommunities.

== Community composition ==
Four constant species are found in this community:

- Red Fescue (Festuca rubra)
- Wild Cabbage (Brassica oleracea)
- Cock's-foot (Dactylis glomerata)
- Sea Carrot (Daucus carota ssp. gummifer)

Three rare species are associated with this community, Wild Cabbage itself, Early Spider-orchid (Ophrys sphegodes) and Nottingham Catchfly (Silene nutans).

== Distribution ==
This community is found on the south coast of Britain, in west Cornwall, Dorset and Kent.

== Subcommunities ==
There are two subcommunities:

- the Beta vulgaris ssp. maritima subcommunity
- the Rayed Ononis repens subcommunity
