= British NVC community OV5 =

UK plant community type

British NVC community OV5 (Digitaria ischaemum - Erodium cicutarium community) is an open habitat community in the British National Vegetation Classification system. It is one of six arable weed and track-side communities of light, less-fertile acid soils.

It is a very localised community. There are no subcommunities.

== Community composition ==
The following constant species are found in this community:

- Smooth hawk's-beard (Crepis capillaris)
- Smooth finger-grass (Digitaria ischaemum)
- Common couch (Elytrigia repens)
- Common stork's-bill (Erodium cicutarium)
- Dove's-foot crane's-bill (Geranium molle)
- Annual meadow-grass (Poa annua)
- Groundsel (Senecio vulgaris)
- Corn spurrey (Spergula arvensis)
- Common chickweed (Stellaria media)

One rare species is associated with the community:

- Loose silky-bent (Apera spica-venti).

== Distribution ==
This community is confined to a single locality in Surrey.
