= British NVC community H4 =

UK plant community type

NVC community H4 (Ulex gallii - Agrostis curtisii heath) is one of the heath communities in the British National Vegetation Classification system. It is one of three communities which are considered transitional between the lowland dry heaths and the wetter communities classified in the NVC as mires.

It is a relatively localised community. There are four subcommunities.

== Community composition ==
The following constant species are found in this community:

- Bristle Bent (Agrostis curtisii)
- Heather (Calluna vulgaris)
- Bell Heather (Erica cinerea)
- Cross-leaved Heath (Erica tetralix)
- Purple Moor-grass (Molinia caerulea)
- Tormentil (Potentilla erecta)
- Western Gorse (Ulex gallii)

The following rare species are associated with the community:

- Bristle Bent (Agrostis curtisii)
- Soft-leaved Sedge (Carex montana)
- Dorset Heath (Erica ciliaris)
- Cornish Heath (Erica vagans)

== Distribution ==
This community is confined to southwest England, from Dorset and Somerset westwards, and the southern coastal region of Wales.

== Subcommunities ==
There are four subcommunities:

- the Agrostis curtisii - Erica cinerea subcommunity
- the Festuca ovina subcommunity
- the Erica tetralix subcommunity
- the Scirpus cespitosus subcommunity
