= Maritime cliff communities in the British National Vegetation Classification system =

UK plant community type

This article gives an overview of the maritime cliff communities in the British National Vegetation Classification system.

== Introduction ==
The maritime cliff communities of the NVC were described in Volume 5 of British Plant Communities, first published in 2000, along with the other maritime communities (those of shingle strand-line and sand-dunes and saltmarshes) and vegetation of open habitats.

In total, 12 maritime cliff communities have been identified.

The maritime cliff communities consist of three subgroups:

- five maritime cliff crevice and ledge communities (MC1, MC2, MC3, MC4 and MC5)
- five maritime grassland communities of sea-cliffs (MC8, MC9, MC10, MC11 and MC12)
- two communities associated with sea-bird cliffs (MC6 and MC7)

== List of maritime cliff communities ==
The following is a list of the communities that make up this category:

- MC1 Crithmum maritimum - Spergularia rupicola maritime rock-crevice community Crithmo-Spergularietum rupicolae Géhu 1964
- MC2 Armeria maritima - Ligusticum scoticum maritime rock-crevice community
- MC3 Rhodiola rosea - Armeria maritima maritime cliff-ledge community
- MC4 Brassica oleracea maritime cliff-ledge community
- MC5 Armeria maritima - Cerastium diffusum ssp. diffusum maritime therophyte community
- MC6 Atriplex prostrata - Beta vulgaris ssp. maritima sea-bird cliff community Atriplici-Betetum maritimae J.-M. & J. Géhu 1969
- MC7 Stellaria media - Rumex acetosa sea-bird cliff community
- MC8 Festuca rubra - Armeria maritima maritime grassland
- MC9 Festuca rubra - Holcus lanatus maritime grassland
- MC10 Festuca rubra - Plantago spp. maritime grassland
- MC11 Festuca rubra - Daucus carota ssp. gummifer maritime grassland
- MC12 Festuca rubra - Hyacinthoides non-scripta maritime bluebell community
