= British NVC community MG2 =

UK plant community type

British NVC community MG2 (Arrhenatherum elatius- Filipendula ulmaria tall-herb grassland) is one of the mesotrophic grassland communities in the British National Vegetation Classification system.

It is a localised community found only in northern England. There are two subcommunities.

== Community composition ==
The following constant species are found in this community:

- Wild Angelica (Angelica sylvestris)
- False Oat-grass (Arrhenatherum elatius)
- Crosswort (Cruciata laevipes)
- Cock's-foot (Dactylis glomerata)
- Male Fern (Dryopteris filix-mas)
- Broad-leaved Willowherb (Epilobium montanum)
- Red Fescue (Festuca rubra)
- Meadowsweet (Filipendula ulmaria)
- Water Avens (Geum rivale)
- Common Hogweed (Heracleum sphondylium)
- Dog's Mercury (Mercurialis perennis)
- Rough Meadow-grass (Poa trivialis)
- Red Campion (Silene dioica)
- Stinging Nettle (Urtica dioica)
- Common Valerian (Valeriana officinalis)
- Swartz's Feather-moss (Eurhynchium swartzii)
- Hart's-tongue Thyme-moss (Plagiomnium undulatum)
- Dented Silk-moss (Plagiothecium denticulatum)
- Bifid Crestwort (Lophocolea bidentata sensu lato)

One rare species, Jacob's-ladder (Polemonium caeruleum), is associated with this community.

== Distribution ==
This community is confined to a small number of localities in northern England - in Derbyshire, Craven and the Cheviots.

== Subcommunities ==
There are two subcommunities:

- the Filipendula ulmaria subcommunity
- the Polemonium caeruleum subcommunity
