= British NVC community SD12 =

UK plant community type

NVC community SD12 (Carex arenaria - Festuca ovina - Agrostis capillaris dune grassland) is one of the 16 sand-dune communities in the British National Vegetation Classification system.

It is one of four communities associated with fixed dunes.

It is a very localised community. There are two subcommunities.

== Community composition ==
The following constant species are found in this community:

- Common Bent (Agrostis capillaris)
- Marram (Ammophila arenaria)
- Sand Sedge (Carex arenaria)
- Sheep's Fescue (Festuca ovina)
- Smooth Meadow-grass (Poa pratensis)

The following rare species is also associated with the community:

- Purple Milk-vetch (Astragalus danicus)

== Distribution ==
This community is found in five coastal localities - one in northeast Scotland, two in southwest Scotland, one in Cumbria and one in Wales.

== Subcommunities ==
There are two subcommunities:

- the Anthoxanthaum odoratum subcommunity
- the Holcus lanatus subcommunity
