= British NVC community W11 =

UK plant community type

NVC community W11 (Quercus petraea - Betula pubescens - Oxalis acetosella woodland) is one of the woodland communities in the British National Vegetation Classification system. It is one of the six communities falling in the "mixed deciduous and oak/birch woodlands" group.

This is a widespread upland community of northern and western Britain. There are four subcommunities.

== Community composition ==
The following constant species are found in this community:

- Silver Birch (Betula pendula) / Downy Birch (Betula pubescens)
- Common Bent (Agrostis capillaris)
- Sweet Vernal-grass (Anthoxanthum odoratum)
- Wavy Hair-grass (Deschampsia flexuosa)
- Heath Bedstraw (Galium saxatile)
- Creeping Soft-grass (Holcus mollis)
- Wood-sorrel (Oxalis acetosella)
- Tormentil (Potentilla erecta)
- Bracken (Pteridium aquilinum)
- Common Dog-violet (Viola riviniana)
- Glittering Wood-moss (Hylocomium splendens)
- Neat Feather-moss (Pseudoscleropodium purum)
- Springy Turf-moss (Rhytidiadelphus squarrosus)
- Common Tamarisk-moss (Thuidium tamariscinum)

No rare species are also associated with the community.

== Distribution ==
This community is widespread throughout upland areas in northern and western Britain, where is replaces community W10. It is particularly well represented in Scotland, north Wales, and northwest England. It is also present in the Southwest Peninsula.

== Subcommunities ==
There are four subcommunities:

- the Dryopteris dilatata subcommunity
- the Blechnum spicant subcommunity
- the Anemone nemorosa subcommunity
- the Stellaria holostea - Hypericum pulchrum subcommunity
