= British NVC community H2 =

UK plant community type

NVC community H2 (Calluna vulgaris - Ulex minor heath) is one of the heath communities in the British National Vegetation Classification system. It is one of five communities categorised as lowland dry heaths.

It has a localised distribution in southern England. There are three subcommunities.

== Community composition ==
The following constant species are found in this community:

- Heather (Calluna vulgaris)
- Wavy Hair-grass (Deschampsia flexuosa)
- Bell Heather (Erica cinerea)
- Dwarf Gorse (Ulex minor)

Two rare species, Bristle Bent (Agrostis curtisii) and Hairy Greenweed (Genista pilosa), are associated with the community.

== Distribution ==
This community is confined to southern England, from Dorset to Surrey and Kent, with the greatest concentrations occurring in the New Forest, Hampshire.

== Subcommunities ==
There are three subcommunities:

- the so-called typical subcommunity
- the Vaccinium myrtillus subcommunity
- the Molinia caerulea subcommunity
