= British NVC community SD18 =

UK plant community type

NVC community SD18 (Hippophae rhamnoides dune scrub) is one of the 16 sand-dune communities in the British National Vegetation Classification system.

It is the only community characterised in the NVC as "dune scrub".

It is a widely distributed coastal community. There are two subcommunities.

== Community composition ==
The community has a single constant species, Sea Buckthorn (Hippophae rhamnoides), which is also regarded by the authors of British Plant Communities as a rare species.

== Distribution ==
This community is found widely on the British east coast from Kent to Fife, but particularly in Norfolk and Lincolnshire; it is also found in a number of west coast localities, for example in Devon, Wales and Lancashire.

== Subcommunities ==
There are two subcommunities:

- the Festuca rubra subcommunity
- the Urtica dioica - Arrhenatherum elatius subcommunity
