= British NVC community W3 =

UK plant community type

NVC community W3 (Salix pentandra - Carex rostrata woodland) is one of the woodland communities in the British National Vegetation Classification system.

It is one of seven woodland communities in the NVC classed as "wet woodlands".

This is a locally distributed community. There are no subcommunities.

== Community composition ==
Thirteen constant species are found in this community:

- Grey willow (Salix cinerea)
- Bay willow (Salix pentandra)
- Wild angelica (Angelica sylvestris)
- Cuckooflower (Cardamine pratensis)
- Bottle sedge (Carex rostrata)
- Marsh-marigold (Caltha palustris)
- Meadowsweet (Filipendula ulmaria)
- Common marsh-bedstraw (Galium palustre)
- Water avens (Geum rivale)
- Marsh valerian (Valeriana dioica)
- Pointed spear-moss (Calligeron cuspidatum)
- Swan's-neck thyme-moss (Mnium hornum)
- Dotted thyme-moss (Rhizomnium punctatum)

Six rare species are also associated with the community:

- Dark-leaved willow (Salix myrsinifolia)
- Fibrous tussock-sedge (Carex appropinquata)
- Lesser tussock-sedge (Carex diandra)
- Coralroot orchid (Corallorrhiza trifida)
- Tufted loosestrife (Lysimachia thyrsiflora)
- Round-leaved wintergreen (Pyrola rotundifolia)

== Distribution ==
This community is distributed locally in submontane regions of northern England and Scotland. The authors of British Plant Communities noted that although the community had not been recorded in Wales, it is likely to be found there too.
