= Mesotrophic grasslands in the British National Vegetation Classification system =

UK plant community type

The mesotrophic grassland communities in the British National Vegetation Classification system were described in Volume 3 of British Plant Communities, first published in 1992, along with the calcicolous grassland communities and the calcifugous grasslands and montane communities.

In total, 13 mesotrophic grassland communities have been identified:

- two communities in which False Oat-grass is the characteristic grass species (one of these, community MG1, is widespread throughout Britain; the other, MG2, is confined to northern England).
- four communities of well-drained permanent pastures and meadows, two of which (MG5 and MG6) are widespread and the other two (MG3 and MG4) more localised
- a single community (MG7) covering a variety of widespread types of Perennial Rye-grass long-term ley
- three widespread communities associated with poorly drained permanent pastures (MG8, MG9, MG10)
- three grass-dominated inundation communities, one of which, MG13, is widespread, the other two, MG11 and MG12, more localised

== List of mesotrophic grassland communities ==
The following is a list of the communities that make up this category:

- MG1 Arrhenatherum elatius grassland Arrhenatheretum elatioris Br.-Bl. 1919
- MG2 Arrhenatherum elatius - Filipendula ulmaria tall-herb grassland Filipendulo-Arrhenatheretum elatioris Shimwell 1968a
- MG3 Anthoxanthum odoratum - Geranium sylvaticum grassland
- MG4 Alopecurus pratensis - Sanguisorba officinalis grassland
- MG5 Cynosurus cristatus - Centaurea nigra grassland Centaureo-Cynosuretum cristati Br.-Bl. & Tx 1952
- MG6 Lolium perenne - Cynosurus cristatus grassland Lolio-Cynosuretum cristati (Br.-Bl. & De Leeuw 1936) R. Tx 1937
- MG7 Lolium perenne leys and related grasslands Lolio-Plantaginion Sissingh 1969 p.p.
- MG8 Cynosurus cristatus - Caltha palustris grassland
- MG9 Holcus lanatus - Deschampsia cespitosa grassland
- MG10 Holcus lanatus - Juncus effusus rush-pasture Holco-Juncetum effusi Page 1980
- MG11 Festuca rubra - Agrostis stolonifera - Potentilla anserina grassland
- MG12 Festuca arundinacea grassland Potentillo-Festucetum arundinaceae Nordhagen 1940
- MG13 Agrostis stolonifera - Alopecurus geniculatus grassland
