= British NVC community MG13 =

UK plant community type

British NVC community MG13 (Agrostis stolonifera - Alopecurus geniculatus grassland) is one of the mesotrophic grassland communities in the British National Vegetation Classification system. It is one of three types of mesotrophic grassland classified as grass-dominated inundation communities.

This community is widely distributed. There are no subcommunities.

== Community composition ==
The following constant species are found in this community:

- Creeping Bent (Agrostis stolonifera)
- Marsh Foxtail (Alopecurus geniculatus)

No rare species are associated with this community.

== Distribution ==
This community is widely distributed throughout the British lowlands, with the most extensive stands in eastern England.
