= British NVC community U6 =

UK plant community type

NVC community U6 (Juncus squarrosus - Festuca ovina grassland) is one of the calcifugous grassland communities in the British National Vegetation Classification system.

It is a comparatively localised community. There are four subcommunities.

== Community composition ==
The following constant species are found in this community:

- Sheep's Fescue (Festuca ovina)
- Heath Rush (Juncus squarrosus)
- Common Haircap Polytrichum commune
- Bifid Crestwort Lophocolea bidentata sensu lato

One rare species is associated with the community, Greater Pawwort, Barbilophozia lycopodioides.

== Distribution ==
This community is found locally in the uplands of Wales, northern England and Scotland.

== Subcommunities ==
There are four subcommunities:

- the Sphagnum spp. subcommunity
- the Carex nigra - Calypogeia trichomanis subcommunity
- the Vaccinium myrtillus subcommunity
- the Agrostis capillaris - Luzula multiflora subcommunity
