= British NVC community MC3 =

UK plant community type

British NVC community MC3 (Rhodiola rosea - Armeria maritima maritime cliff-ledge community) is one of the maritime cliff communities in the British National Vegetation Classification system. It is one of five communities categorised as maritime cliff crevice and ledge communities.

This community is confined to Scotland. There are no subcommunities.

== Community composition ==
Four constant species is found in this community:

- Red Fescue (Festuca rubra)
- Thrift (Armeria maritima)
- Roseroot (Rhodiola rosea)
- Common Sorrel (Rumex acetosa)

No rare species are associated with this community.

== Distribution ==
This community is found on western and northern coasts of Scotland, in the Shetland Isles, and in Aberdeenshire.
