= British NVC community MC7 =

UK plant community type

British NVC community MC7 (Stellaria media - Rumex acetosa sea-bird cliff community) is one of the maritime cliff communities in the British National Vegetation Classification system. It is one of two communities associated with sea-bird cliffs.

This community is found in a number of coastal areas. There are no subcommunities.

== Community composition ==
One constant species is found in this community, Common Chickweed (Stellaria media)

No rare species are associated with this community.

== Distribution ==
This community is found in coastal areas on the west coast of Britain from Pembrokeshire northwards, the north and east coasts of Scotland south to the Firth of Forth, and also on offshore islands including St Kilda.
