= British NVC community MG6 =

UK plant community type

British NVC community MG6 (Lolium perenne - Cynosurus cristatus grassland) is one of the mesotrophic grassland communities in the British National Vegetation Classification system. It is one of four such communities associated with well-drained permanent pastures and meadows.

This community is a virtually ubiquitous community of the British lowlands. There are three subcommunities, one of which is divided into a number of variants.

== Community composition ==
The following constant species are found in this community:

- Common Mouse-ear (Cerastium fontanum)
- Crested Dog's-tail (Cynosurus cristatus)
- Red Fescue (Festuca rubra)
- Yorkshire-fog (Holcus lanatus)
- Perennial Rye-grass (Lolium perenne)
- White Clover (Trifolium repens)

No rare species are associated with this community.

== Distribution ==
This community is widespread in lowland areas of England, Wales and Scotland, with particular concentrations occurring in the Southwest Peninsula, Wales, the Midlands, and parts of northern England and southern Scotland.

== Subcommunities ==
There are three subcommunities:

- the so-called typical subcommunity, subdivided into:
  - an Alopecurus pratensis variant
  - an Alopecurus geniculatus variant
  - a Deschampsia cespitosa variant
  - an Iris pseudacorus variant
- the Anthoxanthum odoratum subcommunity
- the Trisetum flavescens subcommunity
