= British NVC community H1 =

UK plant community type

NVC community H1 (Calluna vulgaris - Festuca ovina heath) is one of the heath communities in the British National Vegetation Classification system. It is one of five communities categorised as lowland dry heaths.

It is a fairly localised community. There are five subcommunities.

== Community composition ==
The following constant species are found in this community:

- Heather (Calluna vulgaris)
- Sheep's Fescue (Festuca ovina)
- Broom Fork-moss Dicranum scoparium
- Cypress-leaved Plait-moss Hypnum cupressiforme sensu lato

No rare species are associated with the community.

== Distribution ==
This community is confined to eastern and southeastern England, from Sussex to Lincolnshire, with the greatest concentrations occurring in Norfolk.

== Subcommunities ==
There are five subcommunities:

- the Hypnum cupressiforme subcommunity
- the Hypogymnia physodes - Cladonia impexa subcommunity
- the Teucrium scorodonia subcommunity
- the Carex arenaria subcommunity
- the so-called species-poor subcommunity
