= British NVC community MC12 =

UK plant community type

British NVC community MC12 (Festuca rubra – Hyacinthoides non-scripta maritime bluebell community) is one of the maritime cliff communities in the British National Vegetation Classification system. It is one of five communities categorised as maritime sea-cliff grasslands.

This community is found locally in western coastal areas of Britain. There are two subcommunities.

== Community composition ==
Four constant species are found in this community:

- Red fescue, Festuca rubra
- Bluebell, Hyacinthoides non-scripta
- Common sorrel, Rumex acetosa
- Yorkshire-fog, Holcus lanatus

One rare species, spring squill (Scilla verna), is associated with this community.

== Distribution ==
This community is found locally in coastal areas in the west of Britain from Devon and Cornwall north to Skye.

== Subcommunities ==
There are two subcommunities:

- the Armeria maritima subcommunity
- the Ranunculus ficaria subcommunity
