= British NVC community MC10 =

UK plant community type

British NVC community MC10 (Festuca rubra - Plantago spp. maritime grassland) is one of the maritime cliff communities in the British National Vegetation Classification system. It is one of five communities categorised as maritime sea-cliff grasslands.

This community is found widely in coastal areas. There are three subcommunities.

== Community composition ==
Five constant species are found in this community:

- Red Fescue (Festuca rubra)
- Buck's-horn Plantain (Plantago coronopus)
- Ribwort Plantain (Plantago lanceolata)
- Sea Plantain (Plantago maritima)
- Creeping Bent (Agrostis stolonifera)

Five rare species are associated with this community:

- Purple Milk-vetch (Astragalus danicus)
- Purple Oxytropis (Oxytropus halleri)
- Scottish Primrose (Primula scotica)
- Spring Squill (Scilla verna)
- Western Clover (Trifolium occidentale)

== Distribution ==
This community is found in coastal areas on the west coast of Britain from Devon and Cornwall north to Shetland, with outlying examples in southeast Scotland and Northumberland.

== Subcommunities ==
There are three subcommunities:

- the Armeria maritima subcommunity
- the Carex panicea subcommunity
- the Schoenus nigricans subcommunity
