= British NVC community MC2 =

UK plant community type

British NVC community MC2 (Armeria maritima - Ligusticum scoticum maritime rock-crevice community) is one of the maritime cliff communities in the British National Vegetation Classification system. It is one of five communities categorised as maritime cliff crevice and ledge communities.

This community is confined to Scotland. There are no subcommunities.

== Community composition ==
Four constant species is found in this community:

- Thrift (Armeria maritima)
- Red Fescue (Festuca rubra)
- Scots Lovage (Ligusticum scoticum)
- Seaside Grimmia (Schistidium maritimum)

No rare species are associated with this community.

== Distribution ==
This community is found primarily on the western and northern coasts of Scotland, with a few outlying stands present on the east coast.
