= British NVC community SD17 =

UK plant community type

NVC community SD17 (Potentilla anserina - Carex nigra dune-slack community) is one of the 16 sand-dune communities in the British National Vegetation Classification system.

It is one of five communities associated with dune slacks.

It is a very localised community. There are four subcommunities.

== Community composition ==
The following constant species are found in this community:

- Creeping Bent (Agrostis stolonifera)
- Common Sedge (Carex nigra)
- Silverweed (Potentilla anserina)
- Pointed Spear-moss (Calliergon cuspidatum)

No rare species are associated with the community.

== Distribution ==
This community is found in two areas - on the east coast, from Spurn Point to northwest Norfolk, and on the dunes of Liverpool Bay.And north Wales.

== Subcommunities ==
There are three subcommunities:

- the Festuca rubra - Ranunculus repens subcommunity
- the Carex flacca subcommunity
- the Caltha palustris subcommunity
- the Hydrocotyle vulgaris - Ranunculus flammula subcommunity
