= British NVC community MG4 =

UK plant community type

British NVC community MG4 (Alopecurus pratensis - Sanguisorba officinalis grassland) is one of the mesotrophic grassland communities in the British National Vegetation Classification system. It is one of four such communities associated with well-drained permanent pastures and meadows.

This community, although widespread in the past, now has a scattered distribution in the Midlands and southern England. One rare species is associated with this community: snake's-head fritillary (Fritillaria meleagris) and six rare micro-species of dandelion, Taraxacum fulgidum, T. haematicum, T. melanthoides, T. sublaeticolor, T. subundulatum and T. tamesense.

There are four subcommunities.

== Subcommunities ==
- the Dactylis glomerata subcommunity

The Cock’s-foot sub-community is the most species-rich of the four sub-communities and is generally found where the water table remains low throughout the growing season and flooding is rare. Distinguishing species that are constant include cock’s-foot (Dactylis glomerata) and yellow oat-grass (Trisetum flavescens). Meadow foxtail, (Alopecurus pratensis) which is included in the scientific name for the overall community is found only sparsely and patchily in this sub-community.

- the Typical subcommunity

The Typical sub-community, as its name implies, describes those stands closest in their species composition to the Burnet floodplain meadow community as a whole. However, stands of the Typical sub-community are less species-rich than those of the Cock’s foot sub-community, with on average 22 species per square metre, and there are no strongly preferential species

- the Holcus lanatus subcommunity

The Yorkshire fog sub-community has a high cover of grasses such as meadow foxtail (Alopecurus pratensis), rough-stalked meadow-grass (Poa trivialis) and creeping bent (Agrostis stolonifera). It tends to be associated with sites which experience a high water table for longer periods during the growing season than the two preceding sub-communities. It is less species-rich than the Cock’s-foot and Typical sub-communities.

- the Agrostis stolonifera subcommunity

The Creeping bent sub-community is the most species-poor. It tends to be associated with areas that experience prolonged inundation (which can also lead to higher soil fertility) and is especially characteristic of the Derwent Ings in Yorkshire.

== Community composition ==
The following constant species are found in this community:

- Meadow foxtail (Alopecurus pratensis)
- Common mouse-ear (Cerastium fontanum)
- Crested dog's-tail (Cynosurus cristatus)
- Red fescue (Festuca rubra)
- Meadowsweet (Filipendula ulmaria)
- Yorkshire-fog (Holcus lanatus)
- Meadow vetchling (Lathyrus pratensis)
- Autumn hawkbit (Leontodon autumnalis)
- Perennial rye-grass (Lolium perenne)
- Ribwort plantain (Plantago lanceolata)
- Meadow buttercup (Ranunculus acris)
- Common sorrel (Rumex acetosa)
- Great burnet (Sanguisorba officinalis)
- Dandelion (Taraxacum officinale agg.)
- Red clover (Trifolium pratense)
- White clover (Trifolium repens)
