= British NVC community MG8 =

UK plant community type

British NVC community MG8 (Cynosurus cristatus - Caltha palustris grassland) is one of the mesotrophic grassland communities in the British National Vegetation Classification system. It is one of three communities associated with poorly drained permanent pastures.

It is a widespread but localised community of the British lowlands. There are no subcommunities.

== Community composition ==
The following constant species are found in this community:

- Sweet Vernal-grass (Anthoxanthum odoratum)
- Marsh-marigold (Caltha palustris)
- Common Mouse-ear (Cerastium fontanum)
- Crested Dog's-tail (Cynosurus cristatus)
- Red Fescue (Festuca rubra)
- Yorkshire-fog (Holcus lanatus)
- Autumn Hawkbit (Leontodon autumnalis)
- Rough Meadow-grass (Poa trivialis)
- Meadow Buttercup (Ranunculus acris)
- Common Sorrel (Rumex acetosa)
- White Clover (Trifolium repens)

No rare species are associated with this community.

== Distribution ==
This community is widespread in the British lowlands, though rather localised.
