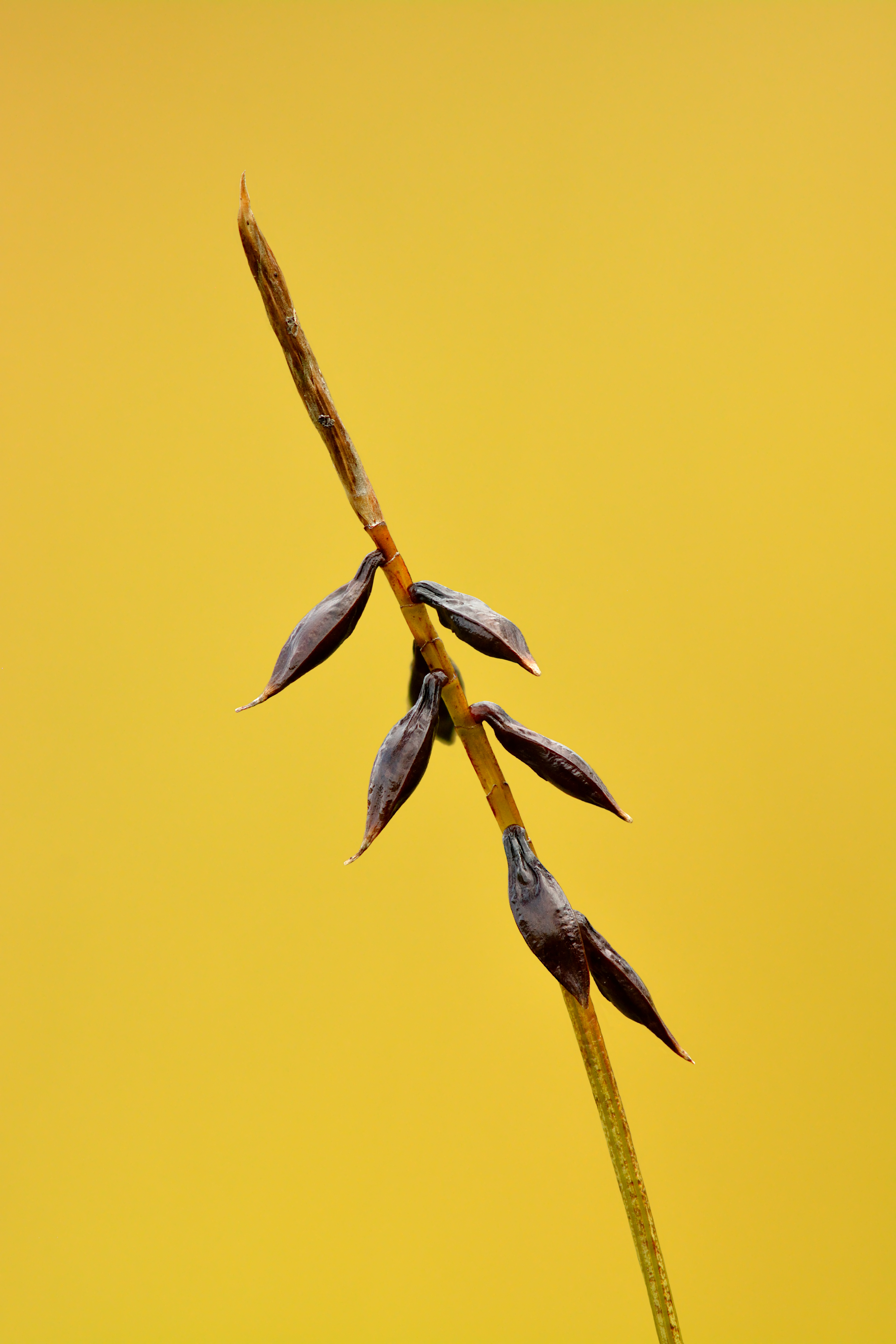

Scientific classification
- Kingdom: Plantae
- Clade: Tracheophytes
- Clade: Angiosperms
- Clade: Monocots
- Clade: Commelinids
- Order: Poales
- Family: Cyperaceae
- Genus: Carex
- Subgenus: Carex subg. Psyllophora
- Section: Carex sect. Unciniiformes
- Species: C. pulicaris

Binomial name
- Carex pulicaris L.

Synonyms
- Carex psyllophora L.f.; Caricinella pulicaris (L.) St.-Lag.; Psyllophora pulicaris (L.) Schur; Psyllophora puliciformis Montandon; Psyllophora vulgaris Heuff.; Vignea pulicaris (L.) Rchb.

= Carex pulicaris =

Species of grass-like plant

Carex pulicaris, the flea sedge, is a species of sedge in the genus Carex native to Europe.

== Description ==
Carex pulicaris is a small sedge, with stiff stems 10–30 centimetres (4–12 in) tall. The leaves are 5–25 cm (2–10 in) long and less than 1 millimetre (0.04 in) wide. The inflorescence comprises a single spike, with 3–10 female flowers towards the base, and male flowers towards the tip. As the utricles mature, they bend away from the spike axis and become sensitive to touch; the way the seeds appear to jump from the stem gives rise to the plant's vernacular name. Before the utricles have become deflexed, C. pulicaris closely resembles C. rupestris, with which it often grows. It may also be confused with C. pauciflora, which usually bears only 2–3 fruit per stem.

== Distribution and ecology ==
Carex pulicaris is found across much of Europe, from Spain to Estonia and north to Iceland and Fennoscandia, but excluding the Mediterranean region. It grows in a variety of wet habitats, including bogs, fens and wet flushes.

== Taxonomy ==
Carex pulicaris was first described in Carl Linnaeus in his 1753 work Species Plantarum. It is not known to hybridise with any other species.
