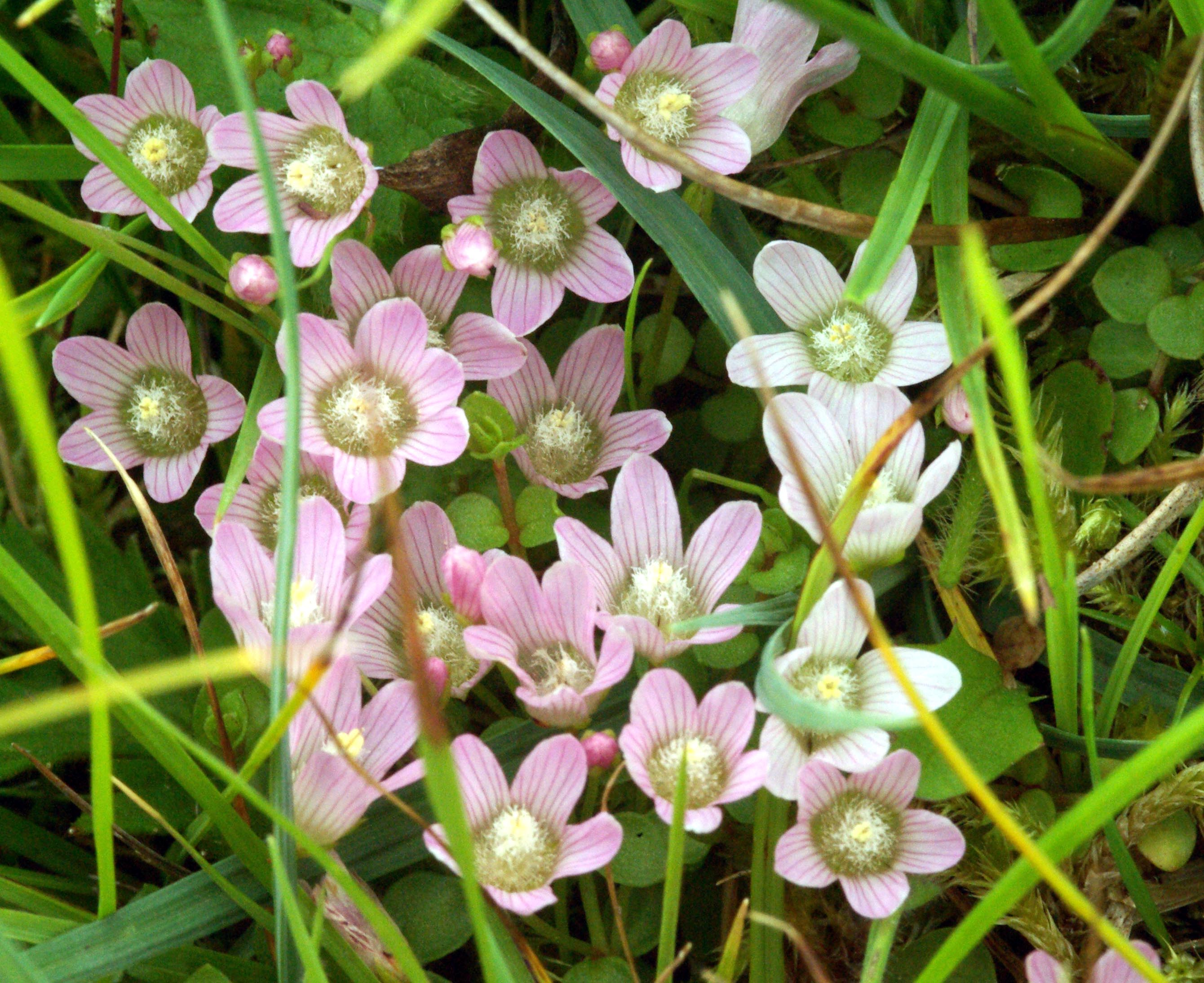

Scientific classification
- Kingdom: Plantae
- Clade: Tracheophytes
- Clade: Angiosperms
- Clade: Eudicots
- Clade: Asterids
- Order: Ericales
- Family: Primulaceae
- Genus: Lysimachia
- Species: L. tenella

Binomial name
- Lysimachia tenella L.

Synonyms
- Anagallis palustris Clairv.; Anagallis repens Pomel, nom. illeg.; Anagallis serpyllifolia Dumort.; Anagallis tenella var. anfrayi Corb.; Anagallis tenella (L.) L.; Centunculus pulcherrimus Büscher & G.H.Loos; Euparea bractealis Baudo; Euparea tenella (L.) Baudo; Jirasekia alpina F.W.Schmidt; Jirasekia tenella Rchb.

= Lysimachia tenella =

Bog pimpernel

Species of flowering plant

Lysimachia tenella, synonym Anagallis tenella, known in Britain as the bog pimpernel, is a low growing perennial plant found in a variety of damp habitats from calcareous dune slacks to boggy and peaty heaths in western and southern Europe and Northwest Africa. In the United Kingdom it is mostly restricted to the western half of the country, although it was more common in the east before land drainage and intensification of farming in that area.

The species was first described by Carl Linnaeus as Lysimachia tenella in 1753. It was later transferred to the genus Anagallis, but returned to Lysimachia when Anagallis was synonymized with that genus, following molecular phylogenetic studies.

The Latin specific epithet tenella means "tender" or "delicate".

In England this plant is a component of the Purple moor grass and rush pastures BAP habitat.

== Sources ==
- Stace, Clive (2010). New Flora of the British Isles. Cambridge University Press. ISBN 978-0521707725.
