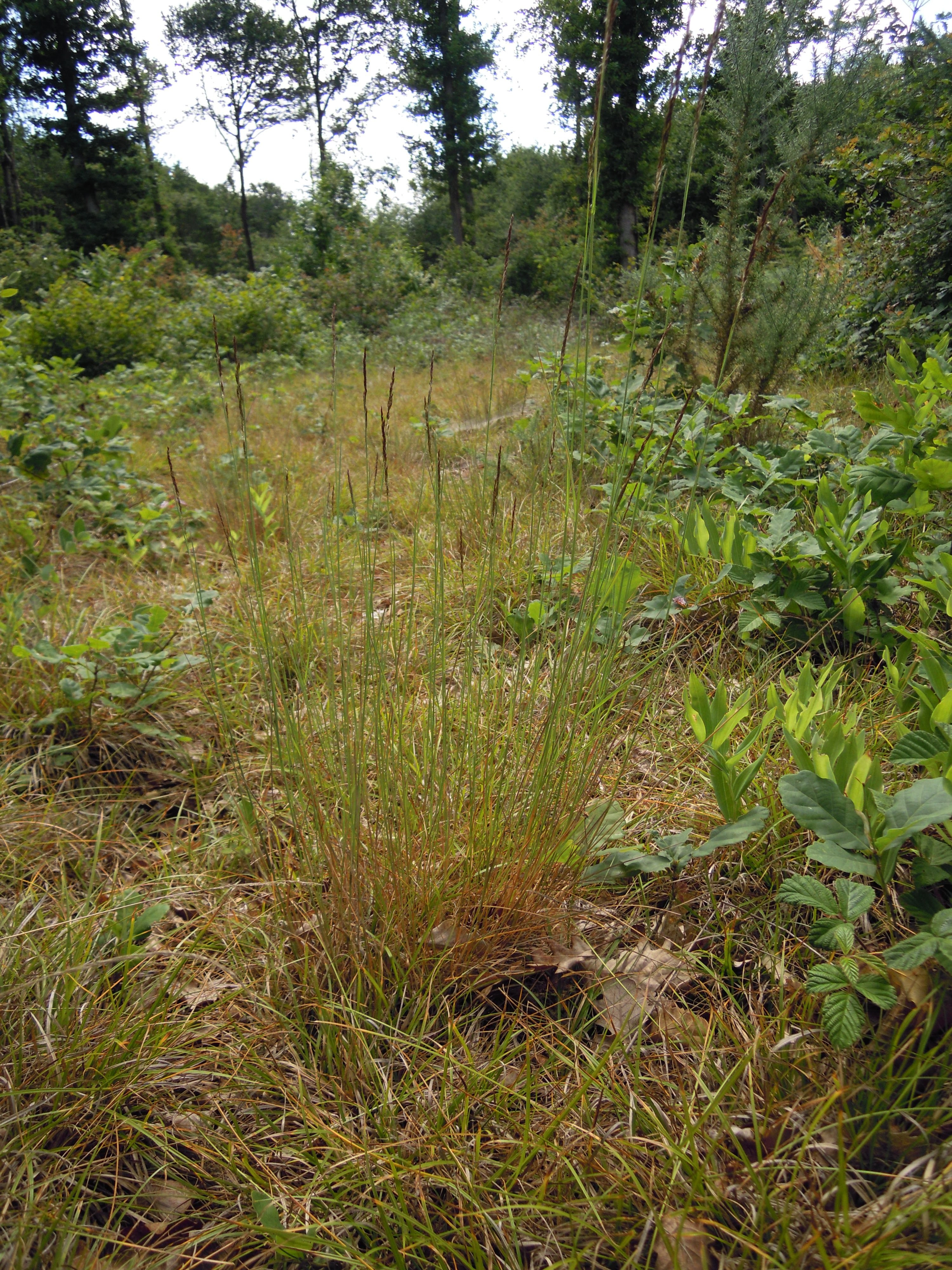

Scientific classification
- Kingdom: Plantae
- Clade: Embryophytes
- Clade: Tracheophytes
- Clade: Spermatophytes
- Clade: Angiosperms
- Clade: Monocots
- Clade: Commelinids
- Order: Poales
- Family: Poaceae
- Subfamily: Pooideae
- Genus: Agrostis
- Species: A. vinealis

Binomial name
- Agrostis vinealis Schreber

Synonyms
- Agrostis tenuifolia M. Bieb.

= Agrostis vinealis =

Species of grass

Agrostis vinealis (Chinese: 芒剪股颖; pinyin: mang jian gu ying) is a species of grass known by the common names brown bentgrass and brown bent, which can be found from Russia to Mongolia, China, Pakistan, India and Alaska. It was introduced to Greenland and South Georgia and the South Sandwich Islands.

== Description ==
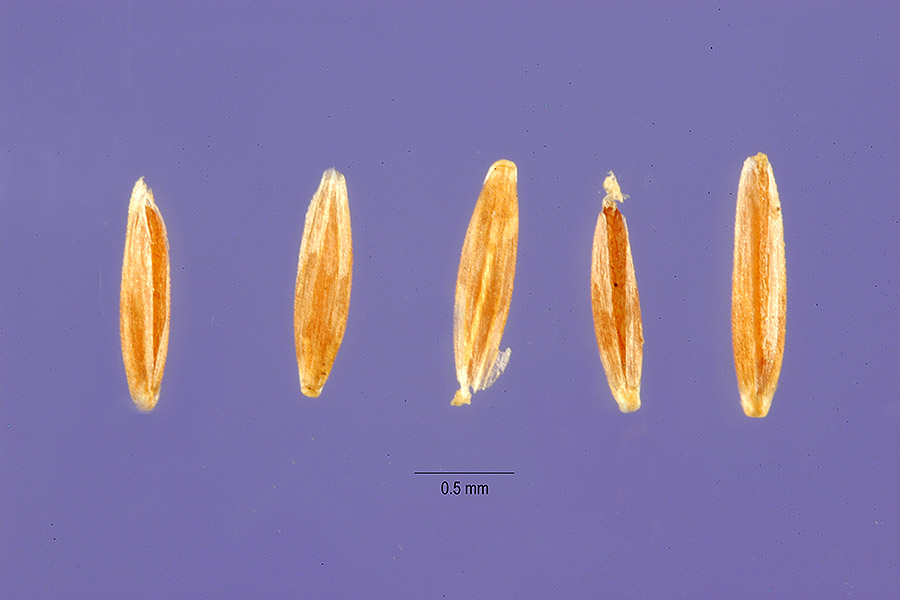
Agrostis vinealis seeds

The plant is 30–60 centimetres (12–24 in) tall, 1 millimetre (0.039 in) wide and is both perennial and caespitose with elongated rhizomes. The culms are 10–60 centimetres (3.9–23.6 in) long and erect. It eciliate membrane have a ligule which is 1–5 millimetres (0.039–0.197 in) long and is obtuse. Leaf-blades are flat, scabrous, and are 2–15 centimetres (0.79–5.91 in) by 1–3 millimetres (0.039–0.118 in). The panicle is 2–20 centimetres (0.79–7.87 in) long and is inflorescenced, lanceolate, open and reddish-purple in colour.

It have solitary spikelets which carry one fertile floret which have a pubescent callus. The spikelets themselves are elliptic, are 2–3.3 millimetres (0.079–0.130 in) long and carry filiformed pedicels. The species carry an oblong fertile lemma which is 1.5–2.5 millimetres (0.059–0.098 in) long and is keelless. The lemma itself have one awn which is 2–4.5 millimetres (0.079–0.177 in) long and palea which is 0.5 millimetres (0.020 in) long and is as hyaline as fertile lemma. The glumes are no different in size then the spikelet. They both are lanceolate, membranous, have no lateral veins and have acute apexes. Flowers are membranous too and have two lodicules. They also carry two stigmas and three stamens the latter of which are 1–1.5 millimetres (0.039–0.059 in) long. The fruits are caryopses with an additional pericarp and linear hilum with farinosed endosperm.

== Distribution ==
In Great Britain, the species is found growing with such trees as birch, pine and oaks on an elevation of 0–845 metres (0–2,772 ft) at the Little Dun Fell, Westmorland, Scotland while in Iceland, it is found on various hills and heathlands. In China, it can be found in such provinces as Heilongjiang, Jilin, and Liaoning on an elevation of 1,500–1,700 metres (4,900–5,600 ft) while in Pakistan it is native to such provinces as Punjab, Gilgit, and Kashmir where it is found on an elevation of 2,300–4,300 metres (7,500–14,100 ft).
