= British NVC community CG5 =

UK plant community type

NVC community CG5 (Bromus erectus - Brachypodium pinnatum grassland) is one of the calcicolous grassland communities in the British National Vegetation Classification system. It is one of four communities of rank, tussocky grassland associated with low levels of grazing, within the lowland calcicolous grassland group.

It is a comparatively widely distributed community. There are two subcommunities.

== Community composition ==
The following constant species are found in this community:

- Tor Grass (Brachypodium pinnatum)
- Quaking Grass (Briza media)
- Upright Brome (Bromus erectus)
- Glaucous Sedge (Carex flacca)
- Dwarf Thistle (Cirsium acaule)
- Sheep's Fescue (Festuca ovina)
- Common Rock-rose (Helianthemum nummularium)
- Mouse-ear Hawkweed (Hieracium pilosella)
- Rough Hawkbit (Leontodon hispidus)
- Bird's-foot Trefoil (Lotus corniculatus)
- Salad Burnet (Sanguisorba minor)
- Wild Thyme (Thymus praecox)

The following rare species are also associated with the community:

- Man Orchid (Aceras anthropophorum)
- Purple Milk-vetch (Astragalus danicus)
- Rare Spring-sedge (Carex ericetorum)
- Slender Bedstraw (Galium pumilum)
- Musk Orchid (Herminium monorchis)
- Round-headed Rampion (Phyteuma tenerum)
- Chalk Milkwort (Polygala calcarea)
- Pasqueflower (Pulsatilla vulgaris)
- Bastard-toadflax (Thesium humifusum)
- Large Thyme (Thymus pulegioides)

== Distribution ==
This community isg found in lowland limestone grassland throughout England.

One noted example occurs at Barnsley Warren in Gloucestershire, and within it are 30,000 Pasqueflowers (Pulsatilla vulgaris), Britain's largest colony.

== Subcommunities ==
There are four subcommunities:

- the so-called typical subcommunity:
- the Hieracium spp. subcommunity
