= British NVC community MC5 =

UK plant community type

British NVC community MC5 (Armeria maritima - Cerastium diffusum ssp. diffusum maritime therophyte community) is one of the maritime cliff communities in the British National Vegetation Classification system. It is one of five communities categorised as maritime cliff crevice and ledge communities.

This community is widespread on the western coasts of Britain, and localised on coasts elsewhere. There are four subcommunities.

== Community composition ==
Six constant species are found in this community:

- Thrift (Armeria maritima)
- Buck's-horn Plantain (Plantago coronopus)
- Red Fescue (Festuca rubra)
- Sea Mouse-ear (Cerastium diffusum ssp. diffusum)
- English Stonecrop (Sedum anglicum)
- Biting Stonecrop (Sedum acre)

The following rare species are associated with this community:

- Chives (Allium schoneoprasum)
- Purple Milk-vetch (Astragalus danicus)
- Wild Cabbage (Brassica oleracea)
- Common Centaury (Centaurium erythraea var. capitatum)
- Hairy Greenweed (Genista pilosa)
- Fringed Rupturewort (Herniaria ciliolata)
- Hairy bird's-foot trefoil (Lotus hispidus)
- Early Sand-grass (Mibora minima)
- Spring Sandwort (Minuartia verna)
- Small Restharrow (Ononis reclinata)
- Orange Bird's-foot (Ornithopus pinnatus)
- Bulbous Meadow-grass (Poa bulbosa)
- Early Meadow-grass (Poa infirma)
- Four-leaved Allseed (Polycarpon tetraphyllum)
- Sand Crocus (Romulea columnae)
- Autumn Squill (Scilla autumnalis)
- Spring Squill (Scilla verna)
- Field Fleawort (Senecio integrifolius ssp. maritimus)
- Western Clover (Trifolium occidentale)
- Suffocated Clover (Trifolium suffocatum)

== Distribution ==
This community is found widely on the coast of the South West Peninsula, and on western coasts of Wales and Scotland. It is more localised on the eastern coast of Scotland, with one stand recorded from Sussex.

== Subcommunities ==
There are four subcommunities:

- the Desmazeria marina subcommunity
- the Anthyllis vulneraria subcommunity
- the Aira praecox subcommunity
- the Arenaris serpyllifolia subcommunity
