= British NVC community MG10 =

UK plant community type

British NVC community MG10 (Holcus lanatus – Juncus effusus rush-pasture) is one of the mesotrophic grassland communities in the British National Vegetation Classification system. It is one of three communities associated with poorly drained permanent pastures.

It is a widespread community throughout the British lowlands. There are three subcommunities.

== Community composition ==
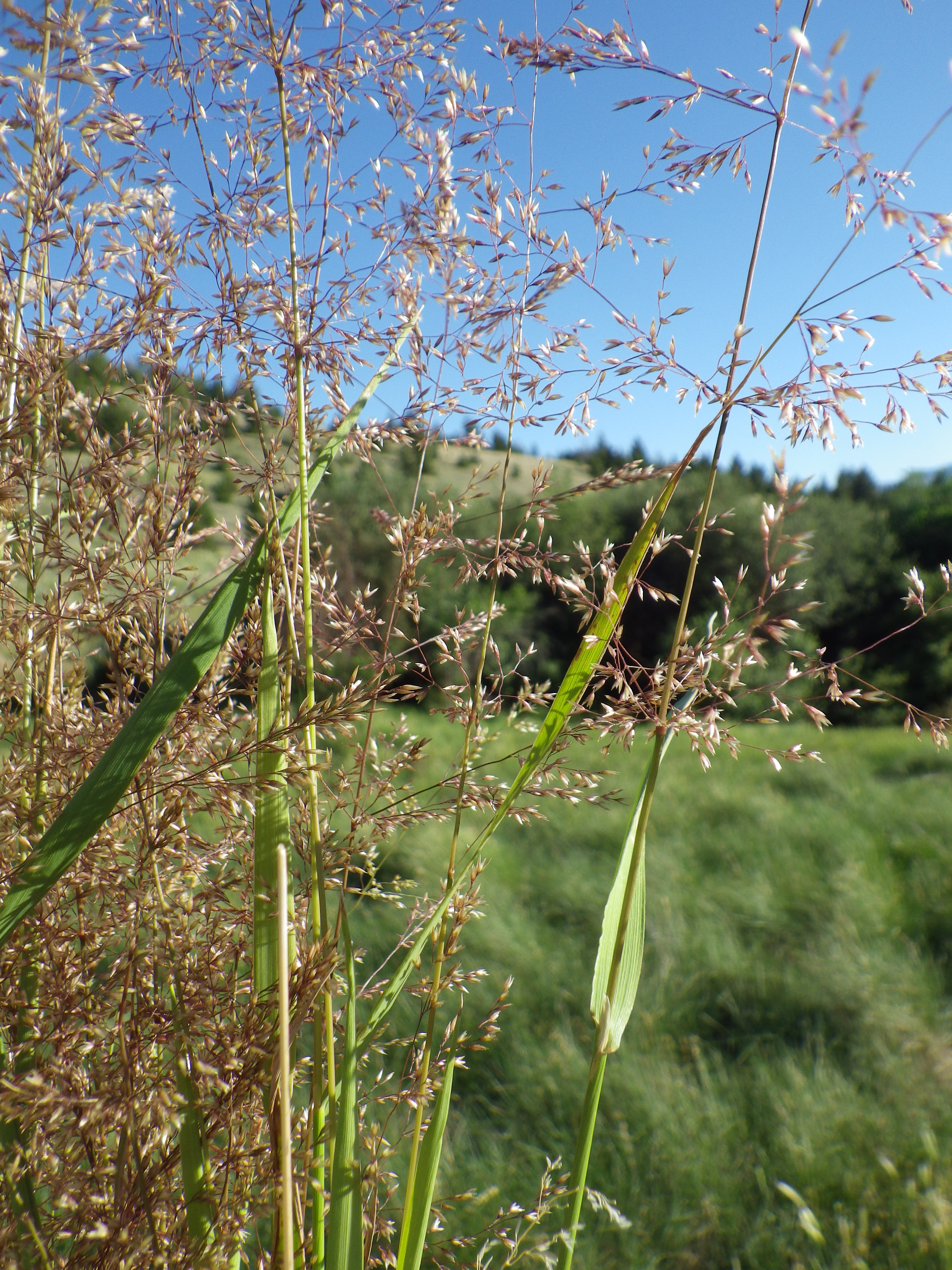
Agrostis stolonifera, Creeping Bent

The following constant species are found in this community:

- Creeping Bent (Agrostis stolonifera)
- Yorkshire-fog (Holcus lanatus)
- Soft Rush (Juncus effusus)
- Creeping Buttercup (Ranunculus repens)

No rare species are associated with this community.

== Distribution ==
This community is widespread in England and Wales; in Scotland it is more localised, being found only in the south and east.

== Subcommunities ==
There are three subcommunities:

- the so-called typical subcommunity
- the Juncus inflexus subcommunity
- the Iris pseudoacorus subcommunity
