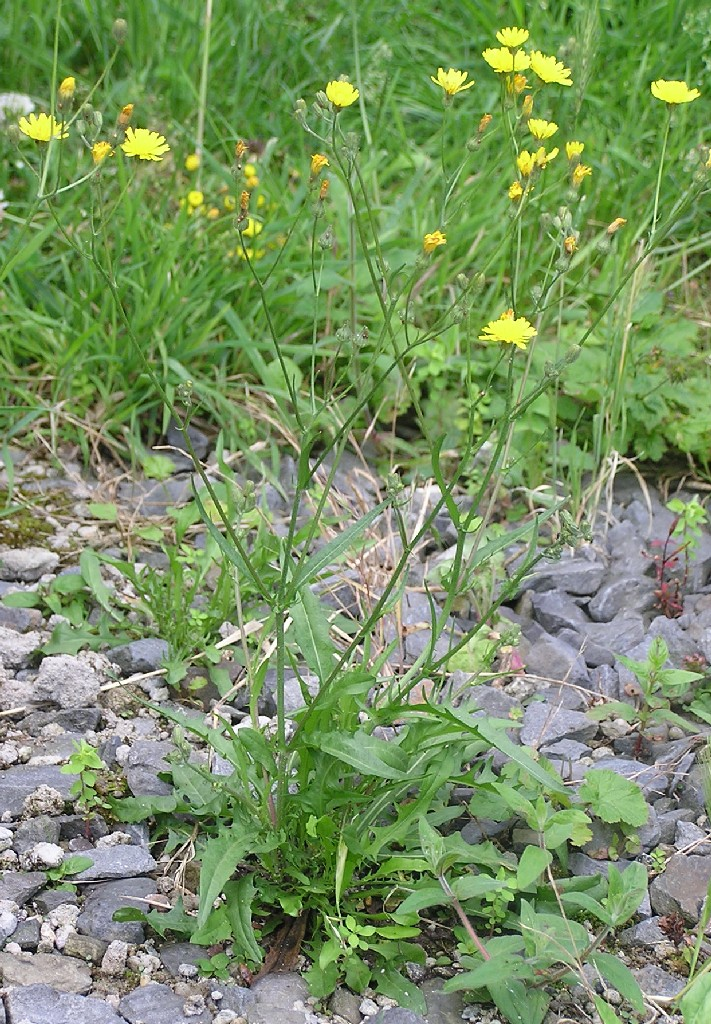

Scientific classification
- Kingdom: Plantae
- Clade: Embryophytes
- Clade: Tracheophytes
- Clade: Angiosperms
- Clade: Eudicots
- Clade: Asterids
- Order: Asterales
- Family: Asteraceae
- Genus: Crepis
- Species: C. capillaris

Binomial name
- Crepis capillaris (L.) Wallr.

Synonyms
- Synonymy: Berinia pinnatifida (Willd.) Sch.Bip.; Crepis agrestis Waldst. & Kit. ex Willd.; Crepis bauhiniana Tausch; Crepis candollei Sch.Bip.; Crepis diffusa DC.; Crepis druceana Murr ex Druce; Crepis gaditana Boiss.; Crepis leiosperma DC.; Crepis linifolia Thuill.; Crepis longepinnatifida Chevall.; Crepis lusitanica Boiss. ex Sch.Bip.; Crepis neglecta M.Bieb.; Crepis nemorum Pourr. ex Willk. & Lange; Crepis parviflora Moench; Crepis pinnatifida Willd.; Crepis uniflora Thuill.; Crepis variabilis Krock.; Lapsana capillaris L.; Malacothrix crepoides A.Gray

= Crepis capillaris =

Species of flowering plant in the daisy family

Crepis capillaris, the smooth hawksbeard, is a species of flowering plant in the tribe Cichorieae within the family Asteraceae, and is native to Europe. It has become naturalized in other lands and is regarded as a weed in some places.

Crepis capillaris is a low, annual plant common in disturbed ground and open habitats, such as thin grassland, lawns, spoil heaps, rocky banks and on roadsides, the stems often trailing along the ground but sometimes erect, the leaves sometimes forming a rosette. It flowers from June to December in the Northern Hemisphere, producing an array of numerous small flower heads. Each head has as many as 60 yellow ray florets but no disc florets.
