= British NVC community MG11 =

UK plant community type

British NVC community MG11 (Festuca rubra - Agrostis stolonifera - Potentilla anserina grassland) is one of the mesotrophic grassland communities in the British National Vegetation Classification system. It is one of three types of mesotrophic grassland classified as grass-dominated inundation communities.

It is a quite localised community. There are three subcommunities.

== Community composition ==
The following constant species are found in this community:

- Creeping Bent (Agrostis stolonifera)
- Red Fescue (Festuca rubra)
- Silverweed (Potentilla anserina)

No rare species are associated with this community.

== Distribution ==
This community is found mainly in lowland river valleys in the Midlands and South West England, with concentrations also in salt marshes on Britain's west coast.

== Subcommunities ==
There are three subcommunities:

- the Lolium perenne subcommunity
- the Atriplex prostrata subcommunity
- the Honkenya peploides subcommunity
