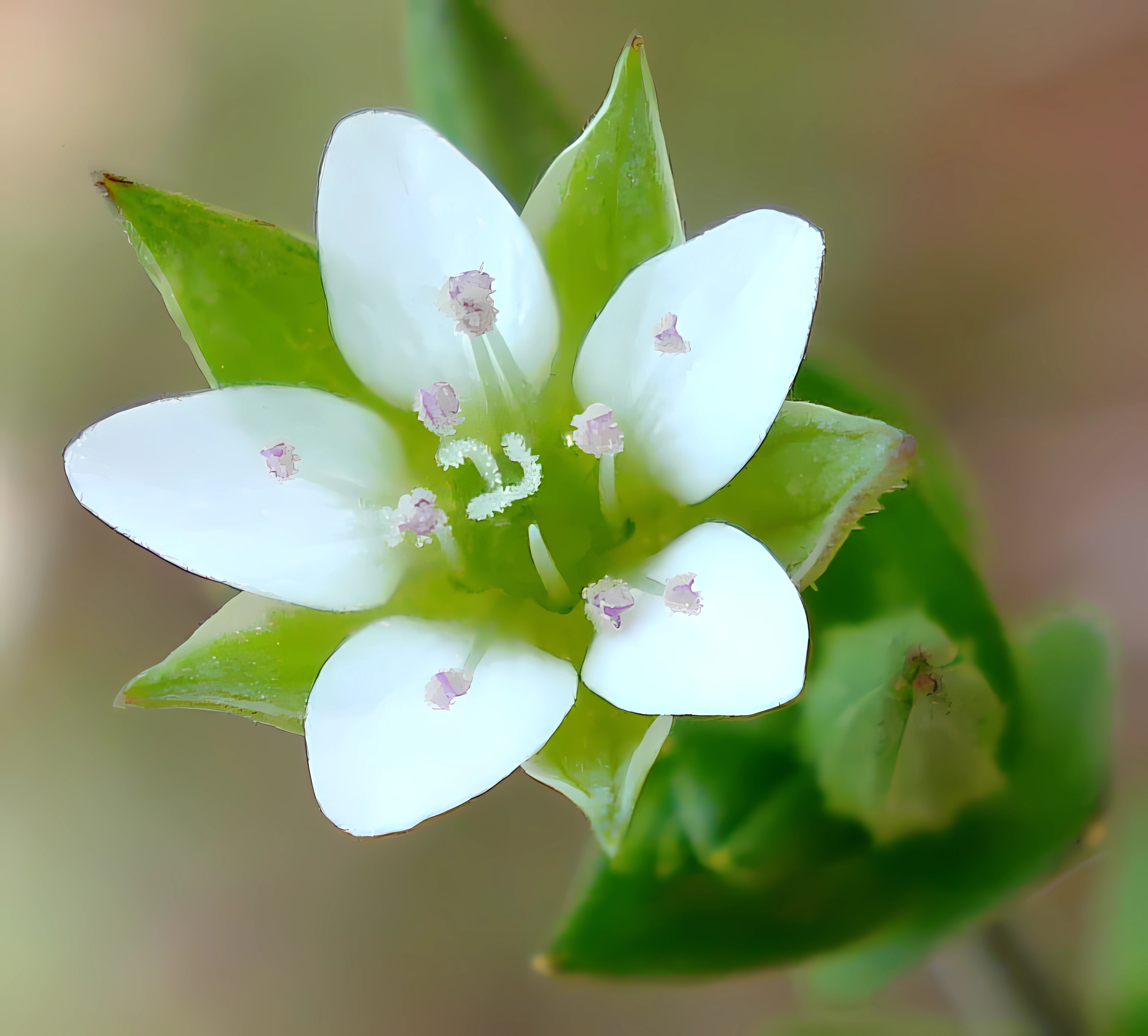

Scientific classification
- Kingdom: Plantae
- Clade: Tracheophytes
- Clade: Angiosperms
- Clade: Eudicots
- Order: Caryophyllales
- Family: Caryophyllaceae
- Genus: Arenaria
- Species: A. serpyllifolia

Binomial name
- Arenaria serpyllifolia L.

Synonyms
- Arenaria alpicola Beck; Arenaria crassifolia Freyn ex Hallier; Arenaria martrinii Tzvelev; Arenaria viscida Loisel. Arenaria wallichiana Ser.

= Arenaria serpyllifolia =

Species of flowering plant in the carnation family

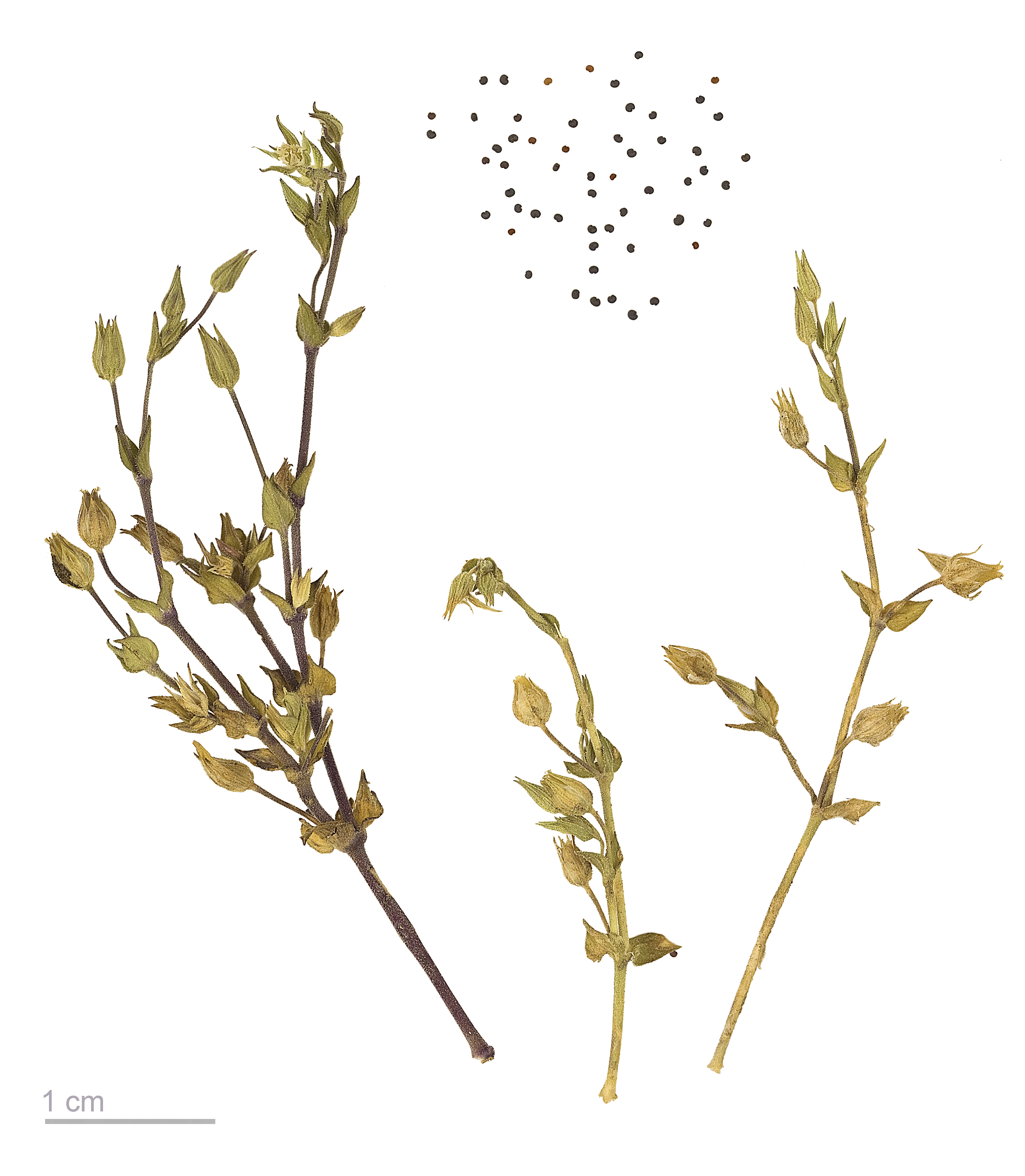
Arenaria serpyllifolia - MHNT

Arenaria serpyllifolia, commonly known as thyme-leaf sandwort or thyme-leaved sandwort, is an annual or biennial flowering plant in the pink and carnation family Caryophyllaceae that can be found from Nepal to Pakistan. It also has a wide distribution in the United Kingdom and southern Poland. It was introduced to Chile. The species is widespread in China.

== Ecology ==
The ants tend to pollinate Arenaria serpyllifolia.

== Uses ==
The extract of the plant is used traditionally to treat kidney and bladder related problems, as well as cough and dysentery.
