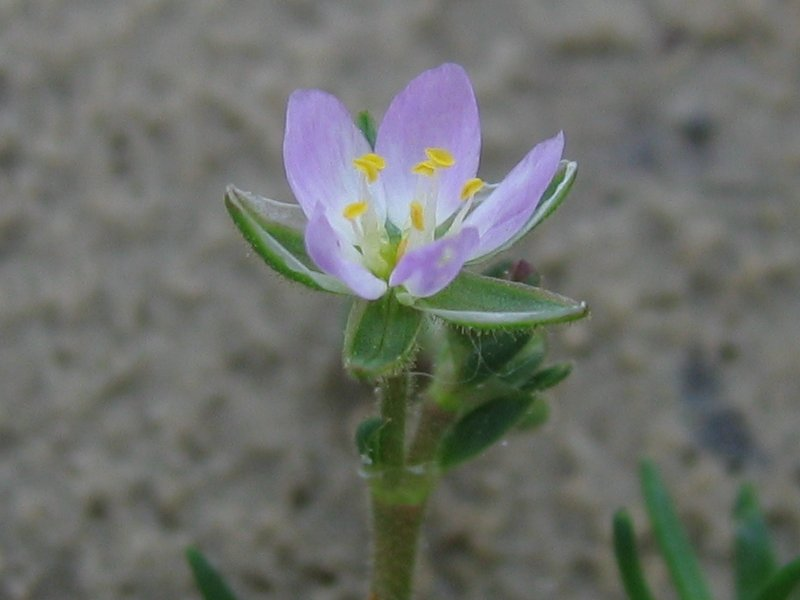

Conservation status
- Least Concern (IUCN 3.1)

Scientific classification
- Kingdom: Plantae
- Clade: Tracheophytes
- Clade: Angiosperms
- Clade: Eudicots
- Order: Caryophyllales
- Family: Caryophyllaceae
- Genus: Spergularia
- Species: S. media

Binomial name
- Spergularia media (L.) C.Presl ex Griseb.

Synonyms
- Spergularia maritima

= Spergularia media =

Species of flowering plant in the pink family

Spergularia media (syn. S. maritima) is a species of flowering plant in the family Caryophyllaceae known by the common names media sandspurry and greater sea-spurrey. It is native to Eurasia and the Mediterranean, where it grows in many types of habitat, including disturbed areas, including places with saline substrates, such as salt marshes and beaches. It is known in many other parts of the world as an introduced species and a common roadside weed. In North America it is a "highway halophyte", often springing up at the margins of roads that are heavily salted in the winter.

== Description ==
It is an annual or perennial herb producing a narrow stem lined with fleshy linear leaves. The small flowers are 8 to 12 mm across with five petals which are usually slightly longer than the sepals. The five petals are oval white or pink-tinged. The tiny seeds have winged margins. It has 10 stamens.
