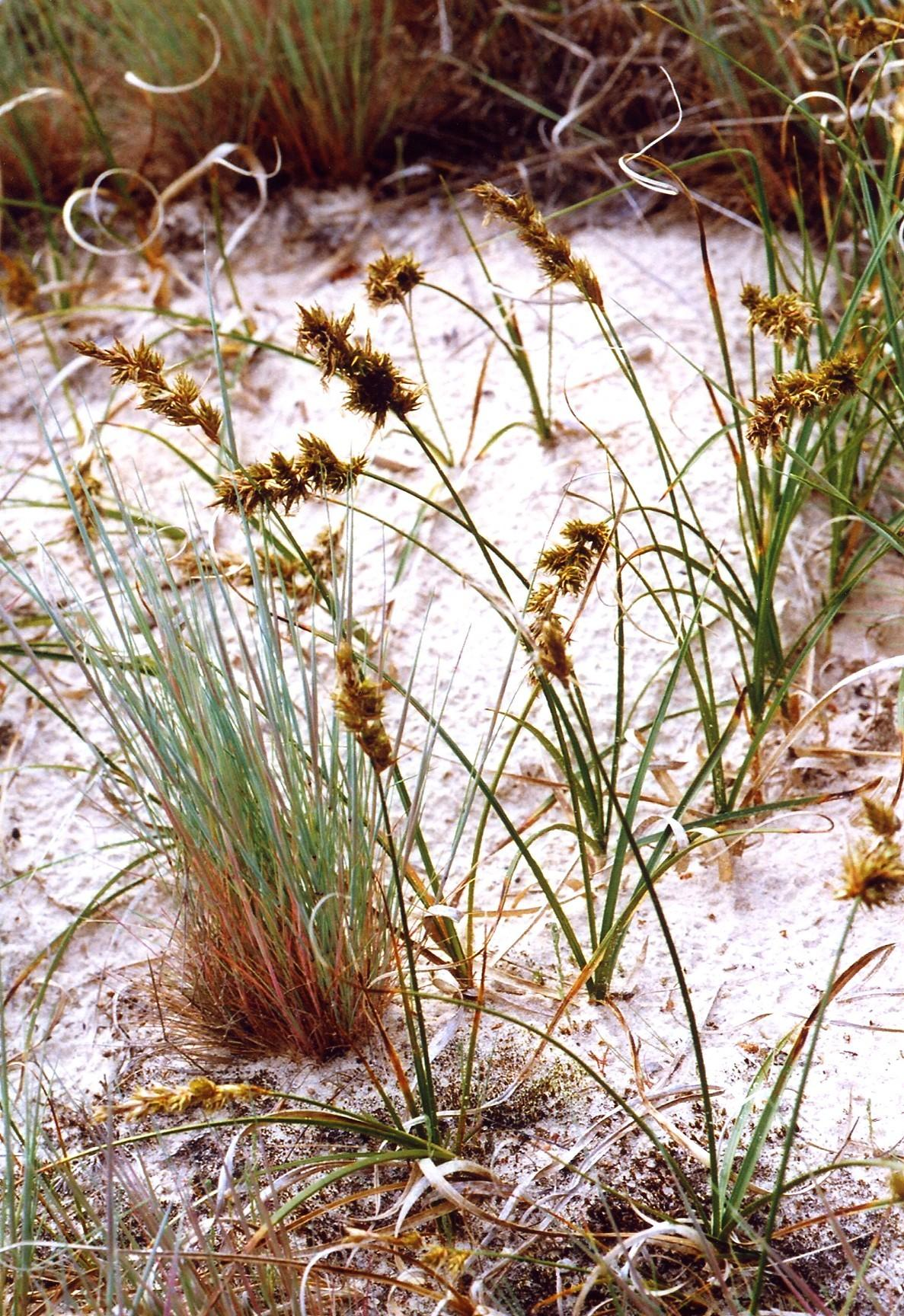

Scientific classification
- Kingdom: Plantae
- Clade: Tracheophytes
- Clade: Angiosperms
- Clade: Monocots
- Clade: Commelinids
- Order: Poales
- Family: Cyperaceae
- Genus: Carex
- Subgenus: Carex subg. Vignea
- Section: Carex sect. Ammoglochin
- Species: C. arenaria

Binomial name
- Carex arenaria L.

= Carex arenaria =

Species of grass-like plant

Carex arenaria, or sand sedge, is a species of perennial sedge of the genus Carex which is commonly found growing in dunes and other sandy habitats, as the species epithet suggests (Latin arenarius, "sandy"). It grows by long stolons under the soil surface.
