= British NVC community MC6 =

UK plant community type

British NVC community MC6 (Atriplex prostrata - Beta vulgaris ssp. maritima sea-bird cliff community) is one of the maritime cliff communities in the British National Vegetation Classification system. It is one of two communities associated with sea-bird cliffs.

This community is found in a number of coastal areas. There are no subcommunities.

== Community composition ==
Four constant species are found in this community:

- Spear-leaved Orache (Atriplex prostata agg.)
- Sea Beet (Beta vulgaris ssp. maritima)
- Red Fescue (Festuca rubra)
- Sea Mayweed (Matricaria maritima)

No rare species are associated with this community.

== Distribution ==
This community is found in coastal areas on the west coast of Britain from southwest Scotland to Devon, along the English south coast from Cornwall to Sussex, and at single site in Suffolk.
