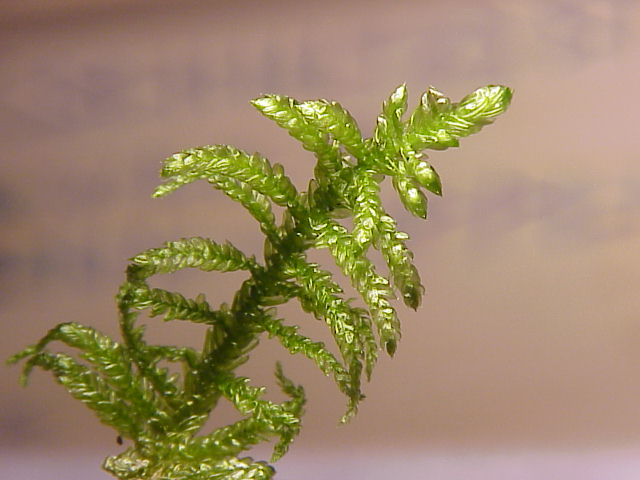
- Pseudoscleropodium purum

Scientific classification
- Kingdom: Plantae
- Division: Bryophyta
- Class: Bryopsida
- Subclass: Bryidae
- Order: Hypnales
- Family: Brachytheciaceae
- Genus: Pseudoscleropodium (Limpr.) M. Fleisch.
- Species: P. purum

Binomial name
- Pseudoscleropodium purum (Hedw.) Fleisch. in Broth.

Synonyms
- Hypnum purum Hedw.; Brachythecium purum (Hedw.) Dixon; Calliergon purum (Hedw.) Naveau; Hylocomium purum (Hedw.) De Not.; Pleurozium purum (Hedw.) Kindb.; Scleropodium purum (Hedw.) Limpr.

= Pseudoscleropodium =

Genus of mosses

Pseudoscleropodium purum, or neat feather-moss, is a species of moss and the sole representative of the genus Pseudoscleropodium.

== Description ==
The species is described as having a pleurocarpous growth habit that forms soft carpets or turfs. It has regularly pinnate shoots up to 15 cm long. Branching may become irregular when growing on disturbed sites, such as mowed lawns. Branches are usually between 1 and 3 cm in length. The shoots of have a swollen appearance which is especially pronounced when moist.

The leaves are yellow-green to dark green and are broadly ovate. They are distinctly recurved at the tip and have a single costa that extends midleaf. Stem leaves are between 2 mm and 2.5 mm in length, while branch leaves are slightly smaller and are found to be between 1 and 2 mm in length.

The moss mainly propagates vegetatively, with sporophytes rarely being observed. The seta is relatively long, ranging between 2 and 5 cm. Sporophytes are not known to occur in North America.

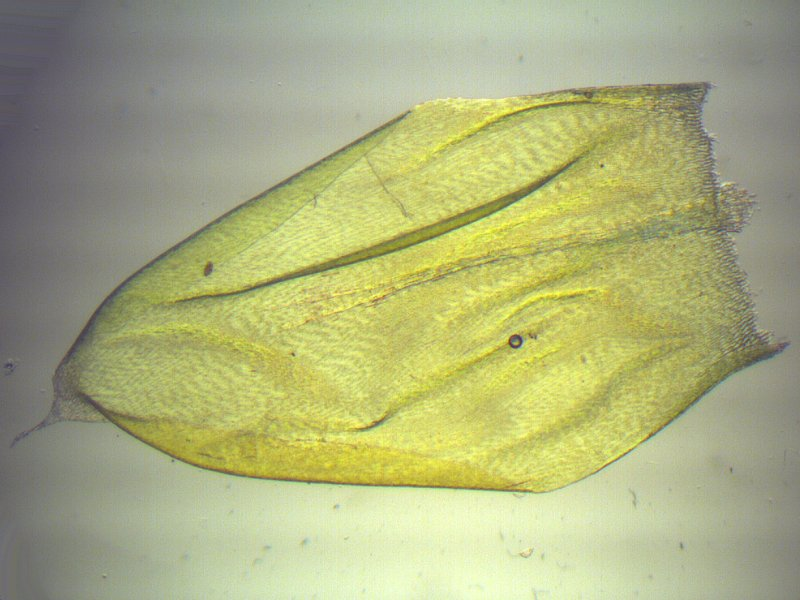
Leaf, magnification: 40x

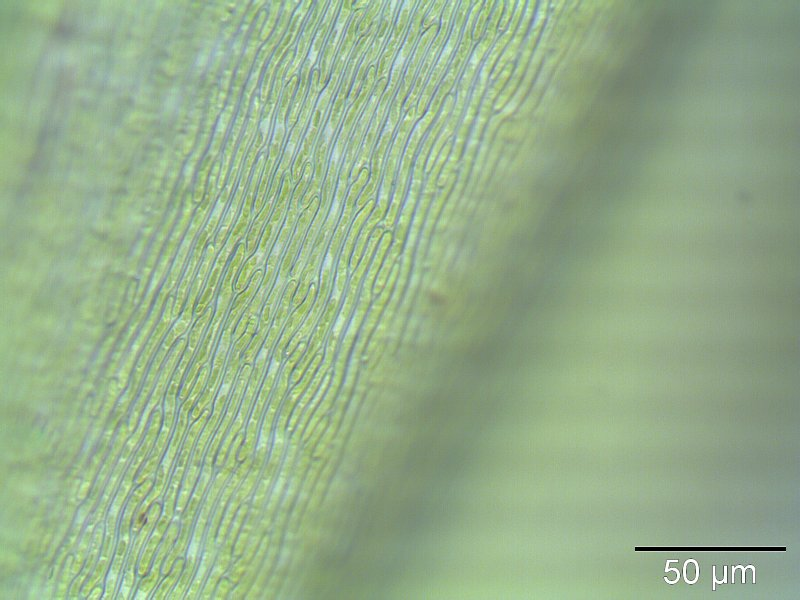
Lamina, magnification: 400x

== Habitat ==
The original range of this species is not known, though it is classified as a European moss. The ambiguity of its original range also makes classifying where it is ‘exotic’ and in turn an invasive species within continental Europe very difficult. Outside of continental Europe, it has been found in the British Isles, Iceland, the Azores, Madeira, the Canary Islands, and much further in Jamaica, Hawaii, Chile, New Zealand, Southeastern Australia, and St. Helena, as well as scattered areas in North America and Asia. In these areas it is considered non-native.

In natural settings, it can be found in areas of low to moderate elevation. It has a range of habitats including acidic and calcified grasslands, heaths, on banks, and among rocks and on rock ledges. It is a typical forest floor moss, especially characteristic of young, reforested areas. Although it is found in open woodland, it is not particularly shade tolerant. A study based in New York consistently found the species in association with several trees. In particular, it is associated with standalone or small groves of Picea abies and Thuja occidentalis. While it grows well in the area right under the canopy, it flourishes when leaf litter is sparse or entirely removed.

It is often found in areas of high anthropogenic activity and disturbance. Primarily, it grows in the lawns of urban areas, cemeteries, forest edges, roadsides, and among discarded lawn clippings. On the Pacific coast, is considered a troublesome lawn weed.

== Spread ==
Given their lack of study in the past, it is difficult to say how the species was introduced to these areas. The exception to this is the historical receipt of a packing shipment:

“...Dickson (1967) reported P. purum being used on St. Helena to pack nursery stock for shipment to Tristan da Cunha, and Allen and Crosby (1987) stated that labels for specimens of [Pseudoscleropodium] from Argentina included the information that the moss had been used as packing material, itself perhaps received in shipments sent to Argentina from Europe.”

This points to the wide scale spread of the species in the form of an auxiliary material. On a local scale, the species likely has been disseminated inadvertently from one lawn to another by professional lawn-care workers.

== Bioremediation ==
The species is a known to bioaccumulate heavy metals and nitrogen. Since the nitrogen concentration in the moss tissue correlates with the nitrogen concentration found in precipitation, it is used for biomonitoring.
