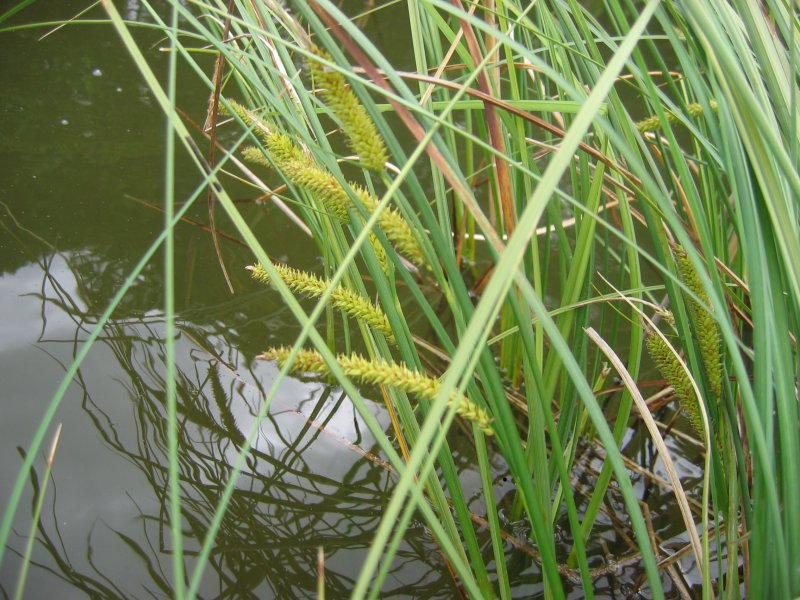

Conservation status
- Least Concern (IUCN 3.1)

Scientific classification
- Kingdom: Plantae
- Clade: Tracheophytes
- Clade: Angiosperms
- Clade: Monocots
- Clade: Commelinids
- Order: Poales
- Family: Cyperaceae
- Genus: Carex
- Subgenus: Carex subg. Carex
- Section: Carex sect. Vesicariae
- Species: C. rostrata

Binomial name
- Carex rostrata Stokes, 1787

= Carex rostrata =

Species of grass-like plant

Carex rostrata, the bottle sedge or beaked sedge, is a perennial species of sedge in the family Cyperaceae.

== Range and habitat ==
The species is native to Holarctic fens and can be found in Canada and the northern part of the United States, and most of Europe, including Britain, north to 71° N, and W. Asia, in wet peaty places with a high water table.
