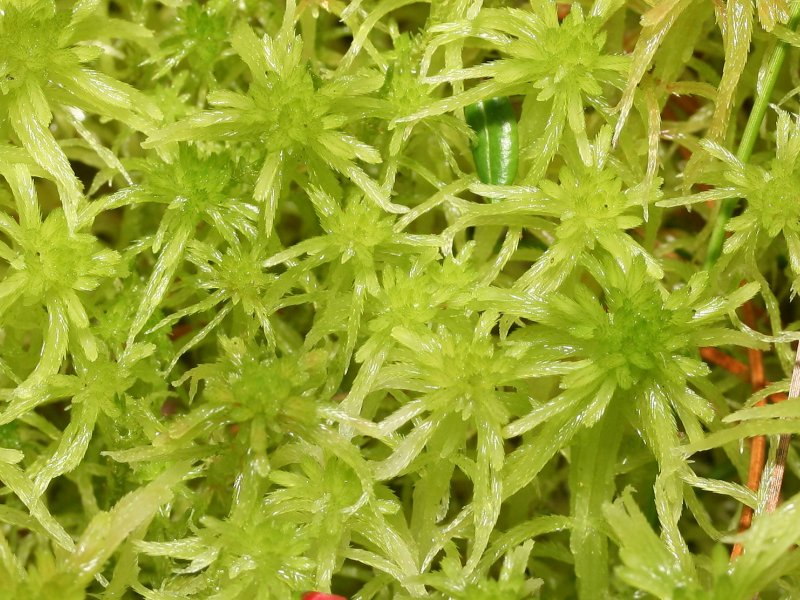

Scientific classification
- Kingdom: Plantae
- Division: Bryophyta
- Class: Sphagnopsida
- Subclass: Sphagnidae
- Order: Sphagnales
- Family: Sphagnaceae
- Genus: Sphagnum
- Species: S. fallax

Binomial name
- Sphagnum fallax (H.Klinggr.) H.Klinggr.

= Sphagnum fallax =

Flat-topped bogmoss

Species of moss

Sphagnum fallax, the flat-topped bogmoss, is a moss species in the genus Sphagnum

While called the flat-topped bogmoss, another common name for S. fallax is the Tricky Peat moss.

== Description ==
Appearing in a range of colors from green to yellow green to yellow brown. This is a medium plant that grows in a carpet and can be found terrestrially or submerged in water, standing upright. Five rows of wavy leaves, lance-like in shape, 1-2mm long, at the branch, which can be neatly arranged together or spaced apart, having a star-shape, domed apical head from a top-down view. Height range is from 8cm to 20cm tall when damp, and may shrink when dry.

== Distribution and habitat ==
Has a wide range across the Northern Hemisphere, growing in moist to wet, cool environments in some areas of Asia, northern Europe, and North America. Can be found in the water or on the water's edges of moist meadows, fens, swamps, and bogs, thriving in shade and partial sunshine. Grows attached to rocks and rooted in the soil.

== Taxonomy ==
Related to S. angustifolium and S. flexuosum, having been a trio that comprised the former S. recurvum. Similar in likeness to S. cuspidatum, however, S. cuspidatum has longer branch leaves of 2-4mm in length, and an unorganized apical head. Also, S. cuspidatum has hanging and spreading branches that show little differentiation.

== Commercial ==
Sphagnum as a genus is currently being tested as an alternate arming solution for fossil peat replacement in horticulture. There was a small-scale case study completed in the spring of 2011 on a four-hectare area that was successful, and supported the idea for moving forward with the use of Sphagnum as an alternative.
