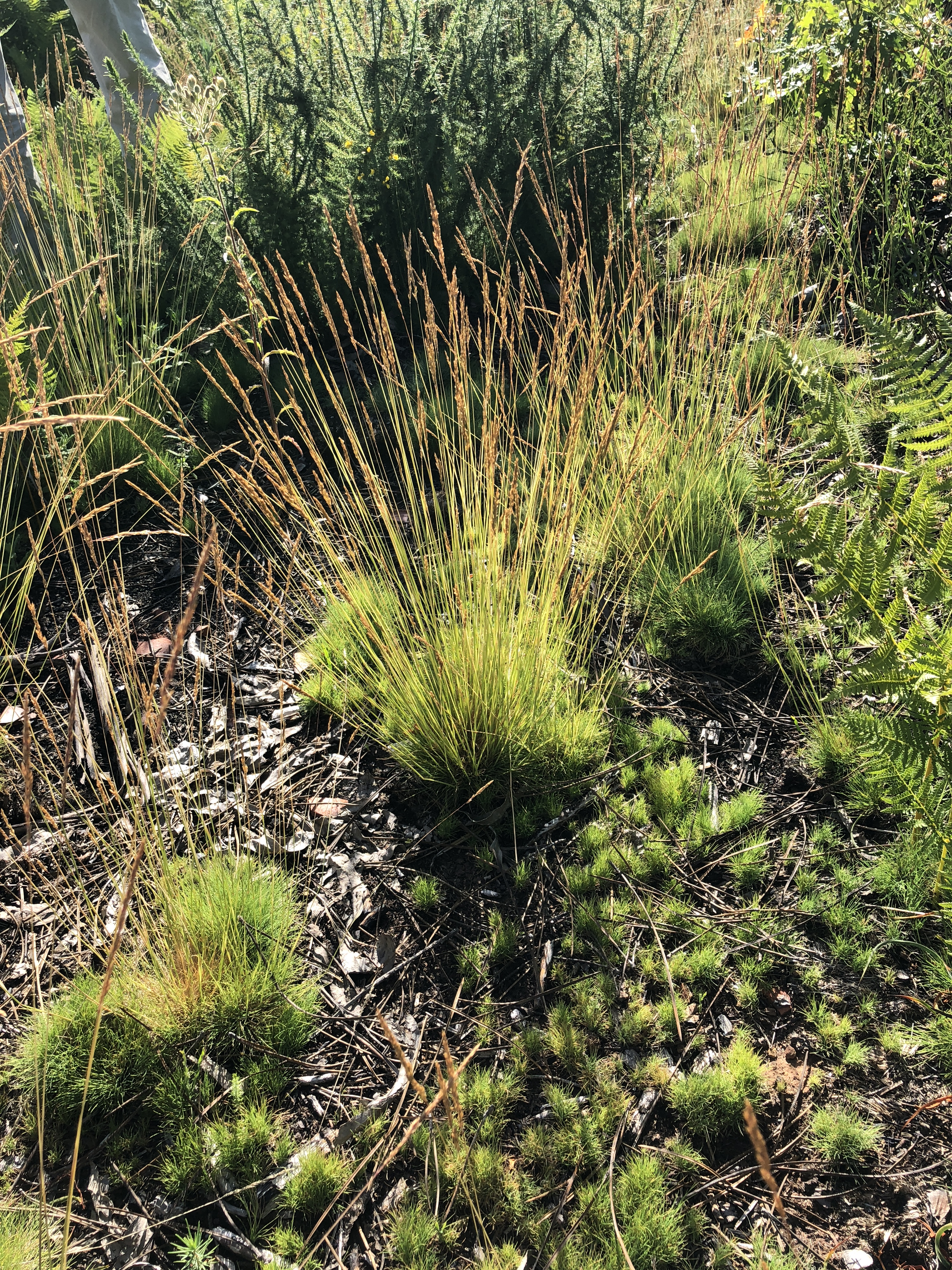

Scientific classification
- Kingdom: Plantae
- Clade: Embryophytes
- Clade: Tracheophytes
- Clade: Spermatophytes
- Clade: Angiosperms
- Clade: Monocots
- Clade: Commelinids
- Order: Poales
- Family: Poaceae
- Subfamily: Pooideae
- Genus: Agrostis
- Species: A. curtisii

Binomial name
- Agrostis curtisii L.

Synonyms
- Agrostis setacea Sibth.

= Agrostis curtisii =

Species of grass

Agrostis curtisii, the bristle bent, is a species of grass in the family Poaceae native to Eurasia.

It is densely tufted, with hair like leaves and stems that grow up to 60 centimetres (2.0 ft). Its spikelets are yellow-green in colour, and its lemmas are awned. The ligule is pointed.

It has no rhizomes or stolons.

Bristle bent flowers in the UK from June until July and is found typically on dry heaths and moors.
