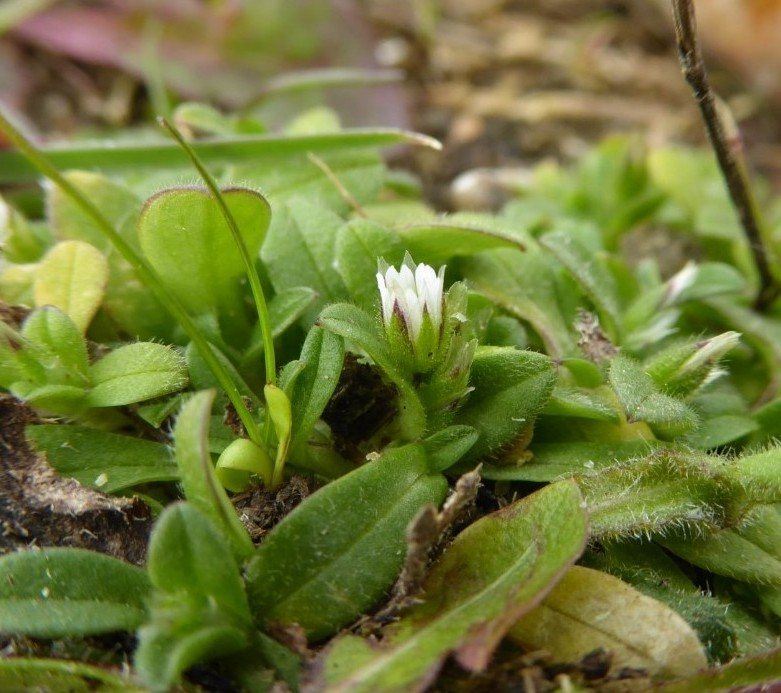

Scientific classification
- Kingdom: Plantae
- Clade: Tracheophytes
- Clade: Angiosperms
- Clade: Eudicots
- Order: Caryophyllales
- Family: Caryophyllaceae
- Genus: Cerastium
- Species: C. semidecandrum

Binomial name
- Cerastium semidecandrum L.

Synonyms
- List: Centunculus semidecandrus (L.) Scop.; Cerastium obtusifolium Lam.; Cerastium varians subsp. semidecandrum (L.) Bonnier & Layens; Myosotis semidecandra (L.) Moench; Spergularia semidecandra (L.) Kitt.; Stellaria semidecandra (L.) Link

= Cerastium semidecandrum =

Species of flowering plant in the carnation family

Cerastium semidecandrum, known as little mouse-ear in English, is an annual herbaceous plant in the flowering plant family Caryophyllaceae. It occurs in sandy, generally acid grassland and thin soils over bare rock. It is native to Europe, western Asia and north Africa and is widely established as an introduced species elsewhere.

== Description ==
Little mouse-ear is a low-growing, patch-forming winter annual or spring ephemeral herb with a distinctive dull-green colour, quickly turning yellow as it ages. It has a slender taproot and fibrous side-roots which makes it easy to dislodge from the ground, especially as it tends to grow in light, friable soils. The typically unbranched stems, which are often tinged purple, spread out along the ground without rooting at the nodes or ascend amongst other vegetation, and lengthen to about 5 cm (2.0 in) long, maximum 20 cm (7.9 in). They are terete and coated with both simple and glandular hairs. The leaves, which are opposite and stalkless, are of two types: the basal ones are an elongated oval shape up to about 1.8 cm long, while the stem leaves are shorter and rounder, maybe only 0.5 cm long. They are all hairy, sometimes with short simple hairs and sometimes with glandular ones as well.

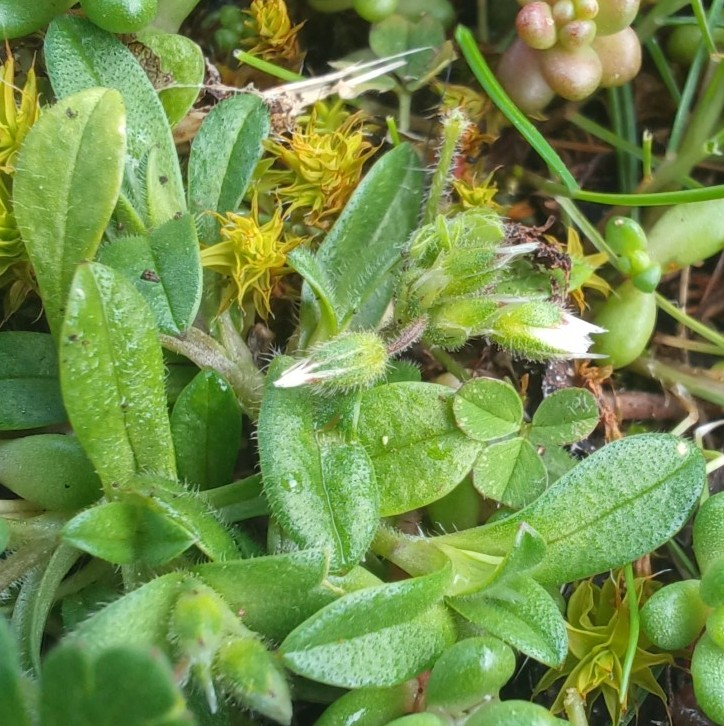
The leaves are oblanceolate and sessile.

Flowering occurs in the early spring, February-May in Northern Europe. The inflorescences are terminal and consist of a group of 1–3 flowers in a dichasium. Each flower is on a short, glandular-hairy pedicel with two bracts at the base. These bracts have a characteristic broad, scarious (papery) margin. There are 5 sepals which are green, hairy, also with a broad scarious margin, and up to 5 mm long. The 5 white petals are a bit shorter than the sepals, so the translucent margins of the sepals project beyond them. Within the flower there are 5 stamens and 5 styles. The flowers are self-pollinating but they are also sometimes visited by insects.

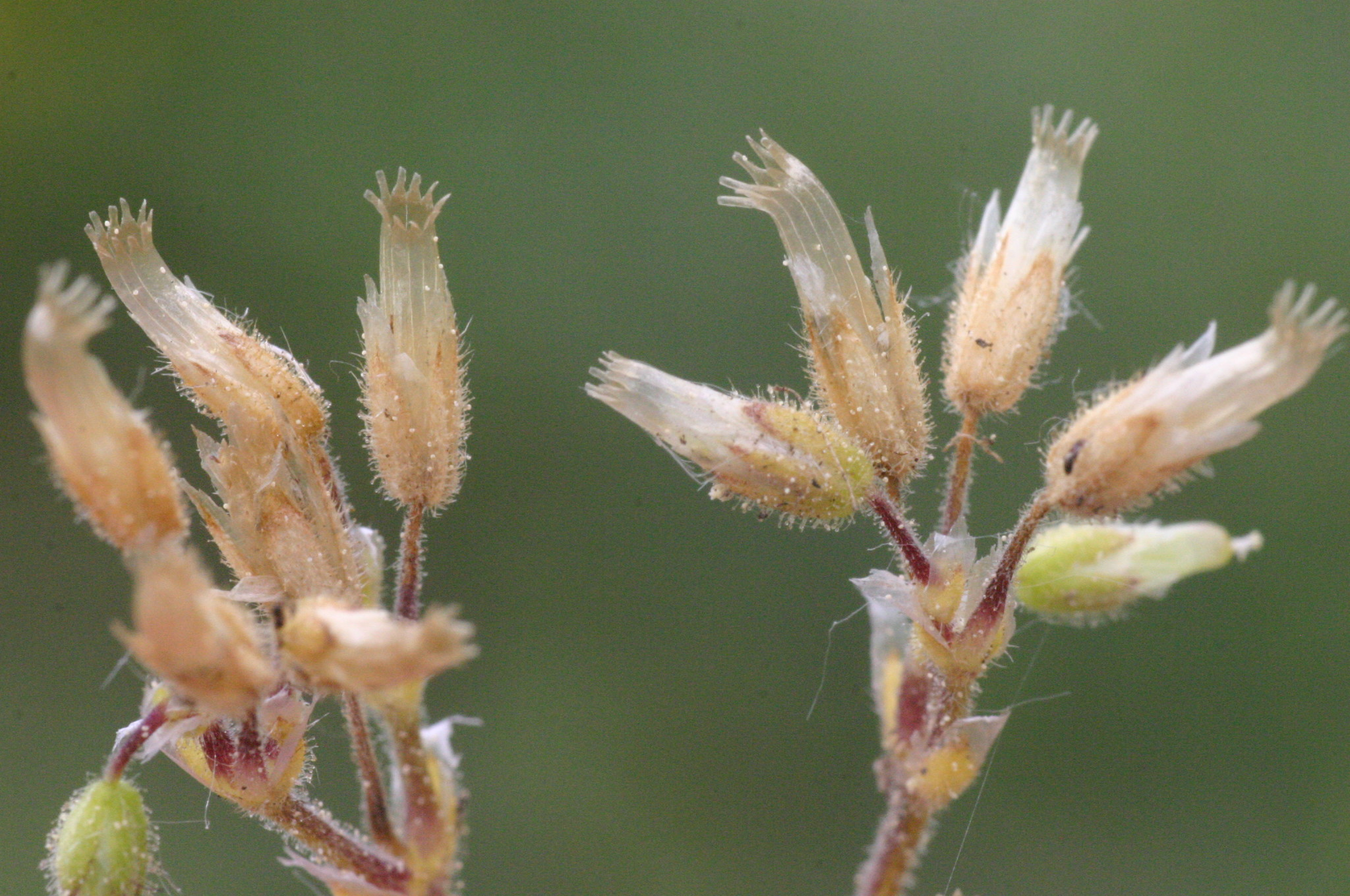
Fruits of little mouse-ear, showing the translucent capsule and the scarious margins to the bracts and sepals

The fruits are formed a week or two after flowering and consist of an tubular translucent capsule about 7 mm long, which projects far beyond the sepals, often curving slightly. It opens at the tip with a ring of 10 teeth. The seeds are about 0.5 mm in diameter, yellowish-brown and coated with tubercles.

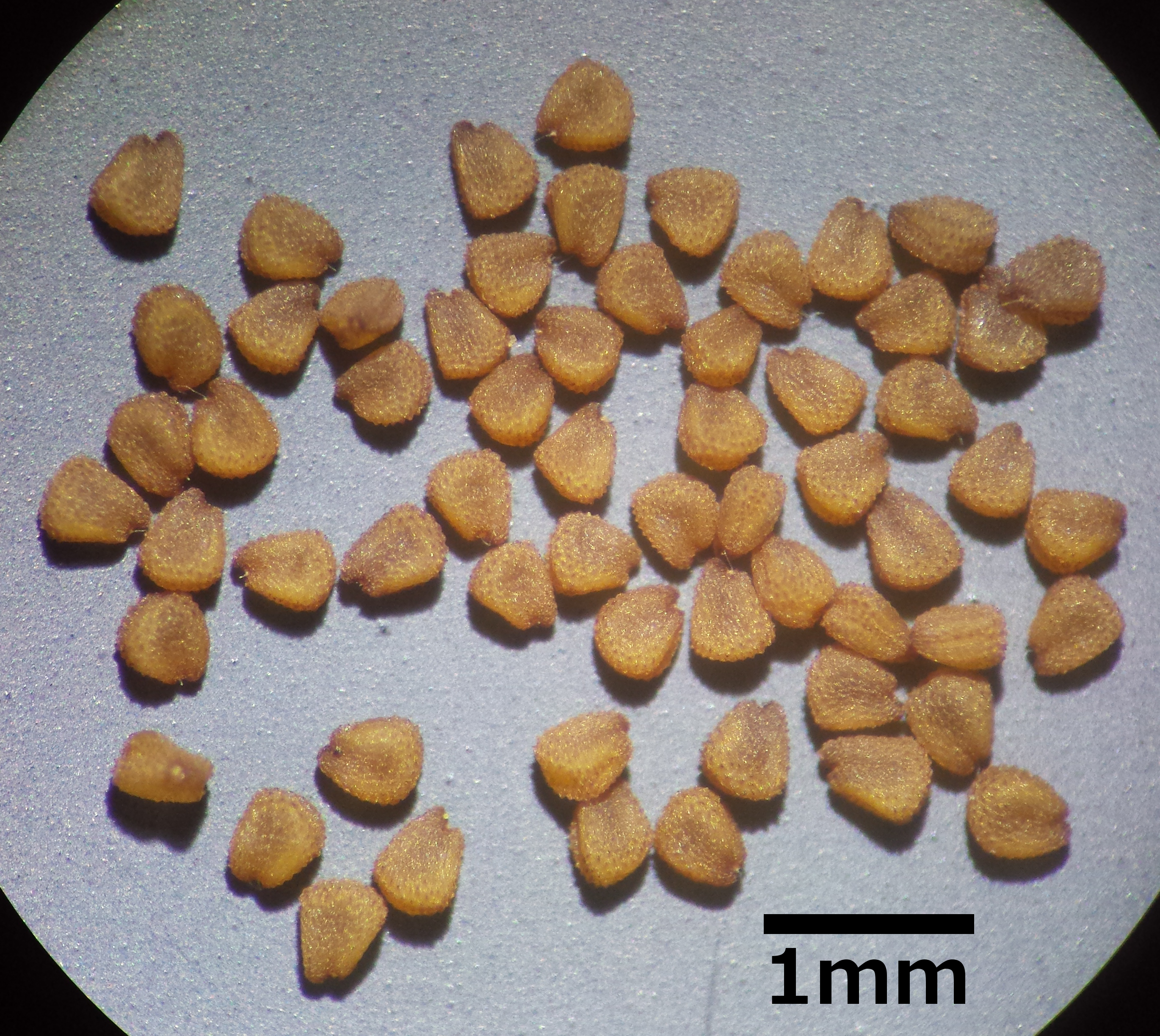
The seeds are yellowish with a tuberculate coat.

== Taxonomy ==
Linnaeus coined the name Cerastium semidecandrum in Species Plantarum vol. 1, p. 438 (1753) and it has stood ever since. It was already a well-known and uncontroversial species. In his earlier work Hortus Cliffortianus, Linnaeus had called it Cerastium floribus pentandris, petalis emarginatis ("the mouse-ear with five parts to the flower and notched petals"), following the descriptive polynomial style of the time. He also cited Dillenius's name for it: Cerastium hirsutum minus, parvo flore ("the little hairy mouse-ear with small flowers"). He described it as occurring in campis apricis sterilissimis Europae borealis ("in the sunny, barren plains of northern Europe").

The generic name Cerastium is derived from the Ancient Greek word κέρας (kéras), which means a horn, in allusion to the fruit capsule, which is tubular and slightly curved. Semidecandrum means "half of ten" and refers to the number of parts (sepals, petals, stamens and styles) in the flower. The mouse-ears are so-called because their leaves are hairy and vaguely pointed, in contrast to the glabrous leaves of the chickweeds, which are otherwise rather similar. Sometimes they are even called mouse-ear chickweeds.

Its chromosome number is 2n = 36. It has no currently accepted subspecies or hybrids.

== Identification ==
Little mouse-ear is easily confused with sticky mouse-ear, sea mouse-ear and dwarf mouse-ear in Britain. They can be separated as follows:

- Sticky mouse-ear has petals as long as the sepals and leaves with long hairs that project beyond the tip;
- Sea mouse-ear has only 4 (not 5) petals and no scarious margin to the bracts;
- Dwarf mouse-ear has bifid (not notched) petals and narrow scarious margins to the bracts.

== Distribution and status ==
Little mouse-ear is native to Europe, northern Africa and south-western Asia. It is considered to be an introduction in NW Asia, including Russia, and it has become established in many other parts of the world, including North and South America, Australia and New Zealand.

It has not yet been evaluated for an IUCN status, but little mouse-ear is classified as a least-concern species in many of the countries in which it is native, including the UK.

In Britain, it is generally considered an axiophyte of species-rich habitat.

== Habitat and ecology ==
The main habitat for this species is on sandy soils by the sea and inland. It is also found on walls, in heathland, on bare or tampled patches of ground and on bare rock including limestone. In the British National Vegetation Classification it is recorded in a variety of coastal dune communities, including SD7, SD8, SD18 and SD19, and on walls in OV42. However, it is probably most common in U1 grassland. It is able to withstand a fair amount of trampling and grazing. Crawley describes it as being absent from the chalk formations in Berkshire.

Its Ellenberg values are L = 8, F = 3, R = 6, N = 3, and S = 0, which signifies a brightly lit situation with dry, neutral soil, low fertility and no salt, although these are only averages and it is clearly tolerant of a range of pH and some salinity.

There are numerous predators and parasites which take advantage of this species, including:

- Small yellow underwing, a moth whose larvae feed on the flowers and seeds;
- Caryocolum alsinella, a micromoth which mines the leaves;
- a fly, Dasineura fructum, whose larvae form galls in the fruits;
- various fungi, including Puccinia arenariae and Septoria cerastii, which cause pustules and leaf spots;
- and a nematode, Ditylenchus dipsaci, which bores into the stems and causes galls.
