= Gustav Adolf Zwanziger =

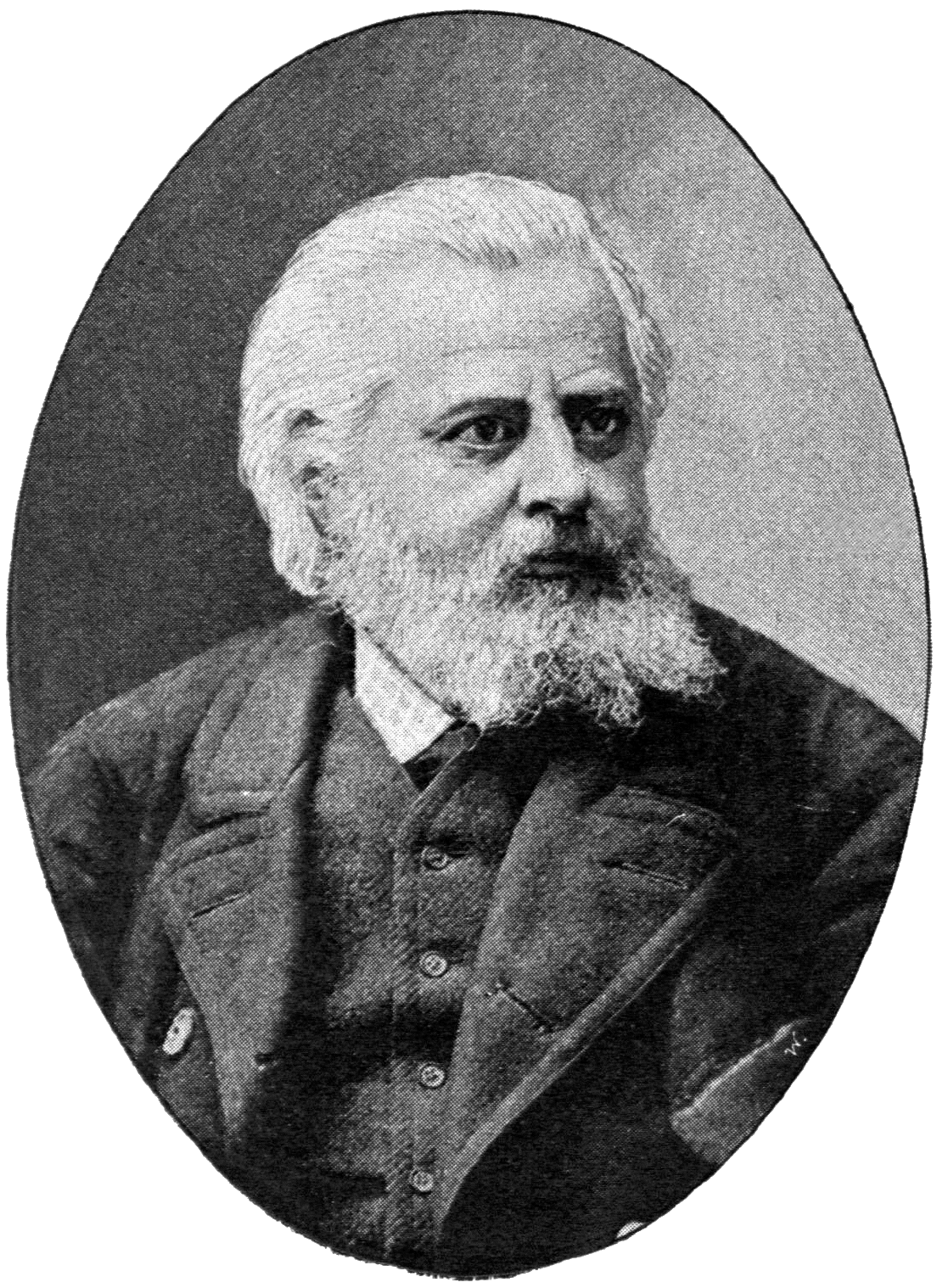
Gustav Adolf Zwanziger (1837-1893)

Gustav Adolf Zwanziger (29 July 1837, in Schloss Neuhof near Neustadtl – 10 June 1893, in Klagenfurt) was an Austrian journalist, botanist and paleobotanist.

From 1851 to 1854, he served as a horticultural apprentice at the Harrachschen Garten in Aschach, followed by work as an assistant-gardener at the Schönbrunn Garden in Vienna. In 1857 he moved to Salzburg, where for several years he served as a clerk at police headquarters. From 1863 to 1868 he worked as an amanuensis at the Studienbibliothek in Klagenfurt. Afterwards, he was associated with the Kärntner Landesmuseum (Carinthian national history museum) in Klagenfurt.

In 1863, Zwanziger edited and distributed the exsiccata Moose der österreichischen Alpenländer. From 1873 to 1886, he was editor of the Kärntner Gartenzeitung, and for several years was an assistant editor of the Klagenfurter Zeitung (1872-1882). In 1882 he donated his herbarium to the Kärntner Landesmuseum.

== Publications ==
- Aufzählung der auf einem Ausfluge nach Heiligenblut im August 1861 gesammelten Laubmoose : mit einer kurzen Schilderung der dortigen Vegetationsverhältnisse, 1862 - Enumeration of mosses collected on an excursion to Heiligenblut in August 1861.
- Neue Funde von Tertiärpflanzen aus den Braunkohlenmergeln von Liescha, 1873 - New findings of Tertiary flora from the lignite marls of Liescha.
- Beiträge zur Miocänflora von Liescha, 1878 - Contributions involving Miocene flora of Liescha.
- Systematische Aufzählung der in Kärnten wildwachsenden Gefässpflanzen, 1881 (with David Pacher); Series: Flora von Kärnten by D. Pacher and Markus von Jabornegg. - Systematic enumeration of plants native to Carinthia.
- Verzeichniss der in Kärnten volksthümlichen deutschen Pflanzennamen, 1887.
