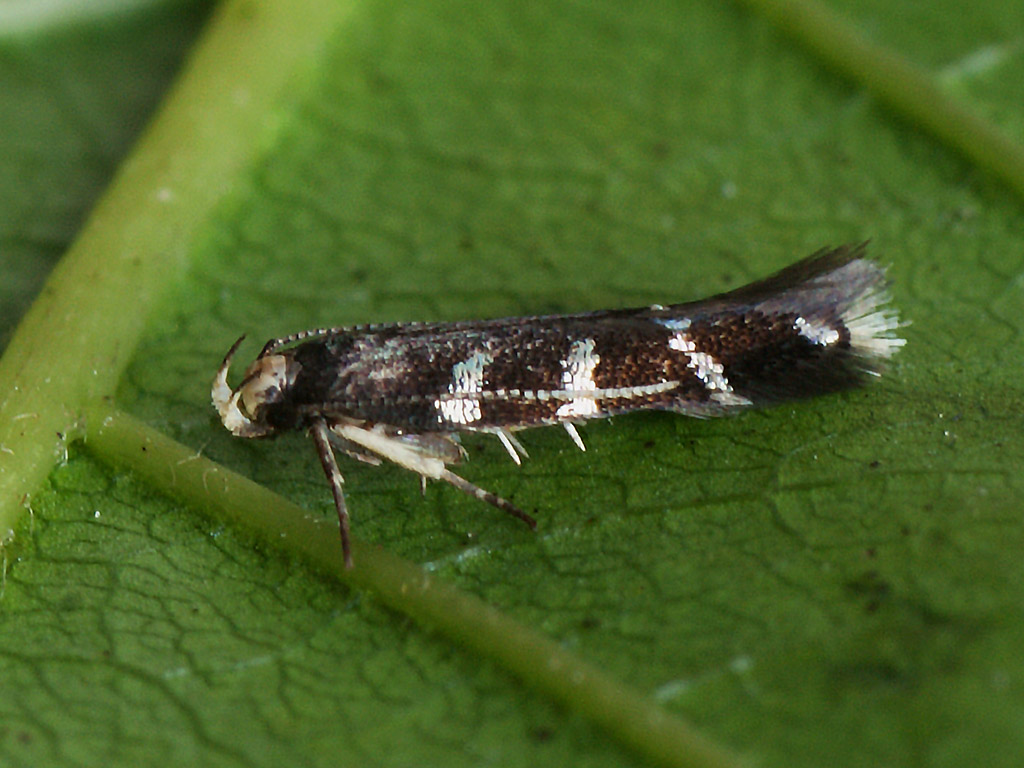

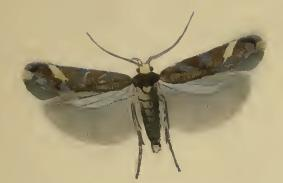

Scientific classification
- Kingdom: Animalia
- Phylum: Arthropoda
- Class: Insecta
- Order: Lepidoptera
- Family: Gelechiidae
- Genus: Eulamprotes
- Species: E. wilkella

Binomial name
- Eulamprotes wilkella (Linnaeus, 1758)

Synonyms
- Phalaena wilkella Linnaeus, 1758; Phalaena (Tinea) merianella Linnaeus, 1758; Gelechia (Brachmia) pictella Zeller, 1839; Eulamprotes pictella; Argyritis pictella; Gelechia tarquiniella Stainton, 1862; Tinea germarella Geyer, 1832

= Eulamprotes wilkella =

Species of moth

Eulamprotes wilkella is a moth of the family Gelechiidae. It is found in most of Europe. Outside of Europe, it is found in Turkey, the Caucasus and Siberia.

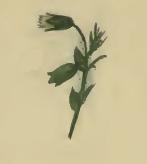
A sprig of Cerastium holosteoides eaten by larva

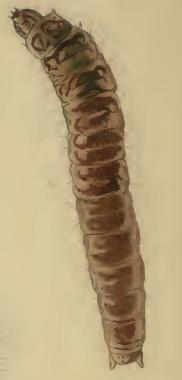
Larva

The wingspan is 8–10 mm. Head white. Antennae with apical third white. Forewings blackish; two bars from costa, at 1/4 and 1/2, a straight sometimes interrupted oblique fascia at 3/4, and an apical spot silvery-metallic; white spots in cilia on costal extremity of fascia and at apex. Hindwings pale grey. Larva light rosy; head pale brown; 2 brownish: in silken galleries.

Adults are on wing in June and again in August in two generations per year.

The larvae feed on Cerastium fontanum.
