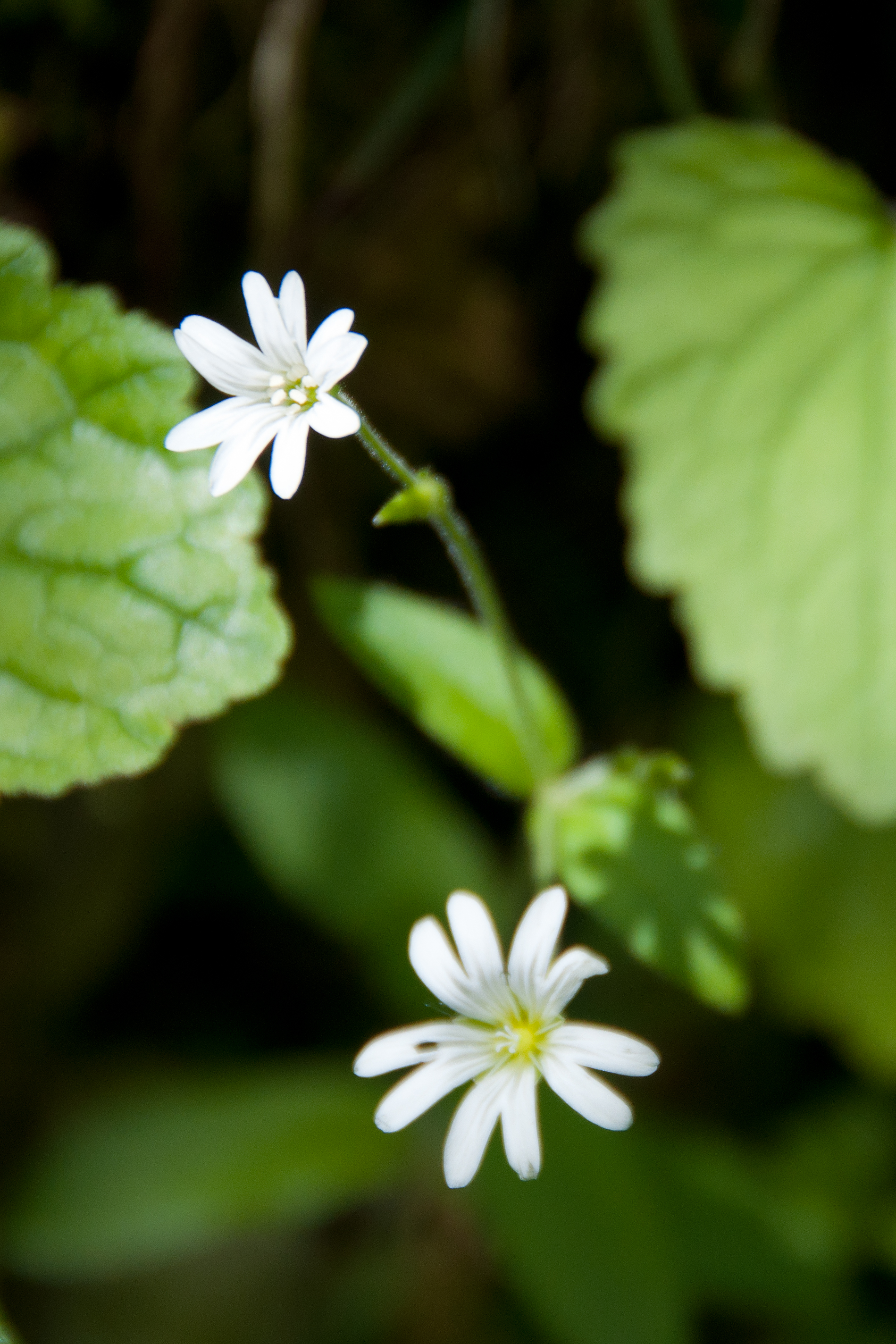

Scientific classification
- Kingdom: Plantae
- Clade: Tracheophytes
- Clade: Angiosperms
- Clade: Eudicots
- Order: Caryophyllales
- Family: Caryophyllaceae
- Genus: Cerastium
- Species: C. subtriflorum

Binomial name
- Cerastium subtriflorum (Rchb.) Pacher

Synonyms
- Cerastium subtriflorum Dalla Torre & Sarnth; Cerastium sonticum Beck; Cerastium carniolicum Preissm. ex Gartner

= Cerastium subtriflorum =

Species of plant

Cerastium subtriflorum, the Slovenian mouse-ear chickweed, is a perennial plant species in the family Caryophyllaceae. It is mostly restricted to the Slovenian and Italian Alps.

== Species ==
German botanist Heinrich Gottlieb Ludwig Reichenbach was the first to describe the species in 1841, although he listed it as a variety subtriflorum of taxon Cerastium lanuginosum. Later Reichenbach mentioned the species in his work Flora Germanica Exsiccata under the name C. latifolium subtriflorum Rchb. C. subtriflorum was recognized as a species by David Pacher in 1886. Austrian botanist Günther Beck von Mannagetta und Lerchenau separated populations that grew in the valley of the river Soča and named them C. sonticum Beck. Later research done by other scientists did not recognize this taxon.

== Description ==
This hirsute and glandular perennial species is a small and low growing plant that can reach up to 30 centimetres of height. Its sessile leaves are elliptical to ovate-lanceolate (lowermost leaves are in some cases oblanceolate) and are arranged opposite to each other. The flowers are bright white and arranged into inflorescences. The plant flowers between June and August. The fruit is a capsule.

Its chromosome number is 2n = 36.

== Distribution ==
Cerastium subtriflorum grows as an endemic plant in the Julian Alps of both Slovenia and Italy, while it also occurs elsewhere, especially on the southern borders of the Kamnik–Savinja Alps and in the valley of the Sava river, as well as the vicinities of Kamnik and Nevljica in central Slovenia. It occupies both lowland regions and the alpine vegetation belt at elevations up to 2000 m. Its habitat usually contains calcareous substrate; most of the times the species can be found on rocky grasslands, screes, cliffs and in forest on humid stony ground.

The current distribution is thought to be connected with Pleistocene glaciations, with the South-Eastern Alps serving as the plant's refugium and allowing endemic species to prosper. Cerastium sylvaticum, which shares some morphological characteristics with C. subtriflorum, is present and more widespread in the same habitat. Analyses of both species' genome show that they are closely related sister taxa. They are both tetraploid species, even though most of other Cerastium species exhibit higher polyploidy levels. Hybridisation may have occurred between them.

Cerastium subtriflorum has not yet been studied for the IUCN Red List.
