= Crimean Mountain karst =

Nature reserve in Crimea

- IUCN category IV (habitat/species management area)
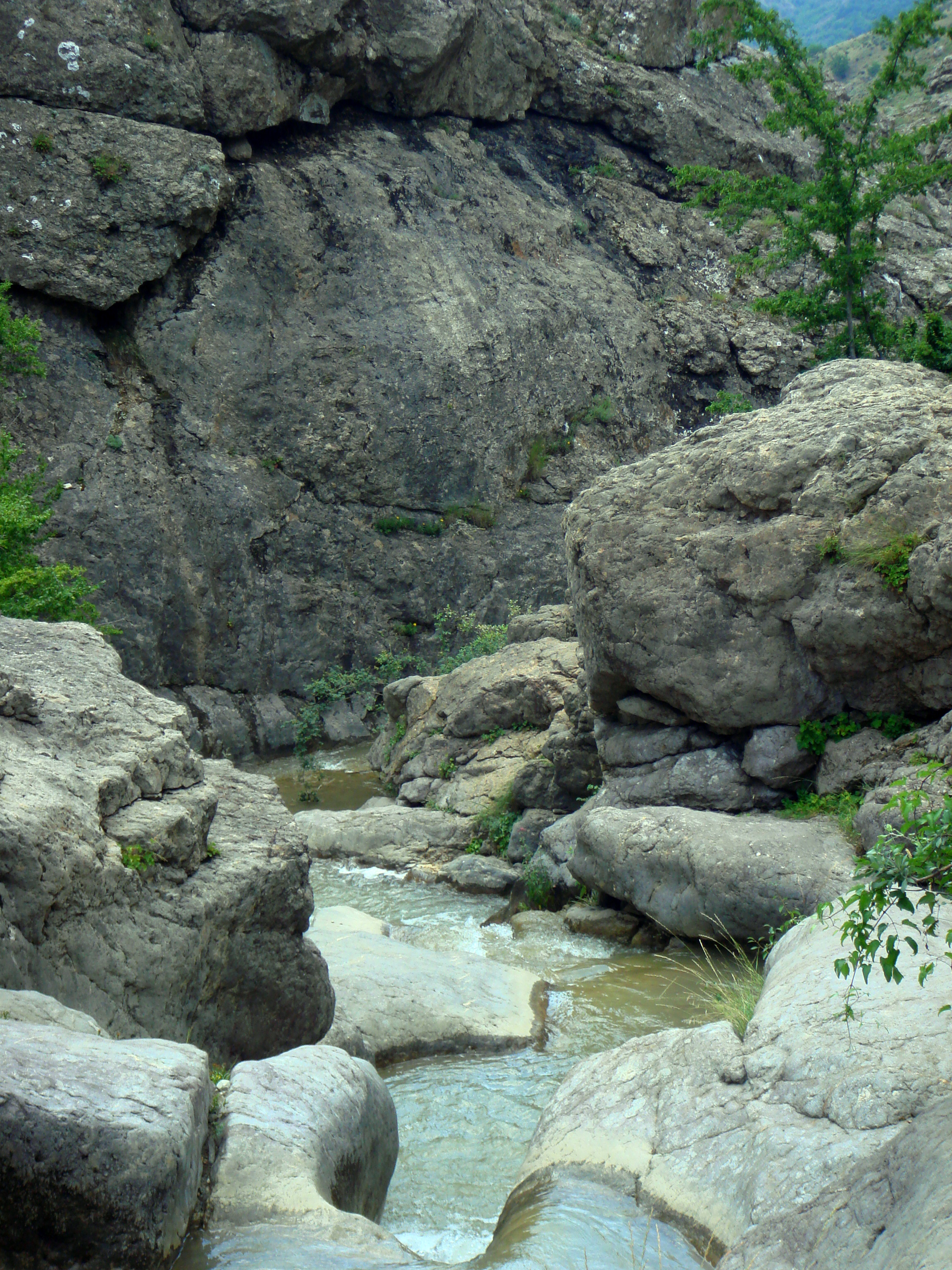
- A waterfall in the Crimean Mountain karst

- Location within Crimea Location within Ukraine
- Nearest city: Heneralske
- Coordinates: 44°50′54″N 34°32′9″E
- Area: 4,316 ha (43.16 km^{2})
- Established: 13 February 1989

The Crimean Mountain karst (Note: Crimean Tatar: Къырымнынъ дагъ карсты, romanized: Qırımnıñ dağ karstı, IPA: [qɯɾɯmˈnɯɴ dɑʁ kɑɾsˈtɯ]; Ukrainian: Гірський карст Криму, romanized: Hirśkyj karst Krymu, IPA: [ˈɦirsʲkɪi̯ kɑrst ˈkrɪmʊ]; Russian: Горный карст Крыма, romanized: Gornyj karst Kryma, IPA: [ˈgornɨj karst ˈkrɨmə]) is a karst and regional nature reserve (a zakaznik) in Crimea, a region internationally recognised as part of Ukraine but currently under occupation by Russia since 2014. It is a part of the larger Qarabiy yayla mountain range, making up the central part of the range. The area was first described by Alexander Kruber in 1915. In 1989 the Crimean Mountain karst was recognised as a regional nature reserve.

== Description ==
In 1915 Alexander Kruber first described the karst of the mountains. The Crimean Mountain karst was declared a nature reserve in 1989. Comprising central Qarabiy yayla, the Crimean Mountain karst includes more than 4,000 sinkholes and 209 caves, among them the Soldier cave, the deepest in Crimea. Additionally, the top of the karst is home to beech and pine forests, as well as meadows and areas dominated by Cerastium biebersteinii. The area has more than 1000 natural karst cavities. Minerals found in the cavities include: calcite, gypsum, goethite, aragonite, illite, quartz, kaolinite and pyrolusite.

The main part of the Crimean Mountains is made up of Jurassic limestone formations 50 m (160 ft) to 1,300 m (4,300 ft) in depth. The ridge is 600 m (2,000 ft) above the Crimea southern coast. There are thousands of karst sinks with some karst fissures 100 m (330 ft) long and 50 m (160 ft) deep.

== Status ==
The Crimean Mountain karst was recognised as a regional nature preserve by the Ukrainian SSR on 13 February 1989, alongside several other areas throughout Ukraine. This designation remained in place following the Declaration of Independence of Ukraine.

Since the annexation of Crimea by the Russian Federation, the Crimean Mountain karst has been recognised as a State Geographical Nature Reserve of Regional Importance (Russian: Государственный природный заказник регионального значения, romanized: Gosudarstvennyi prirodnyi zakaznik regionalnogo znacheniya), equivalent to the Ukrainian title of regional nature reserve.
