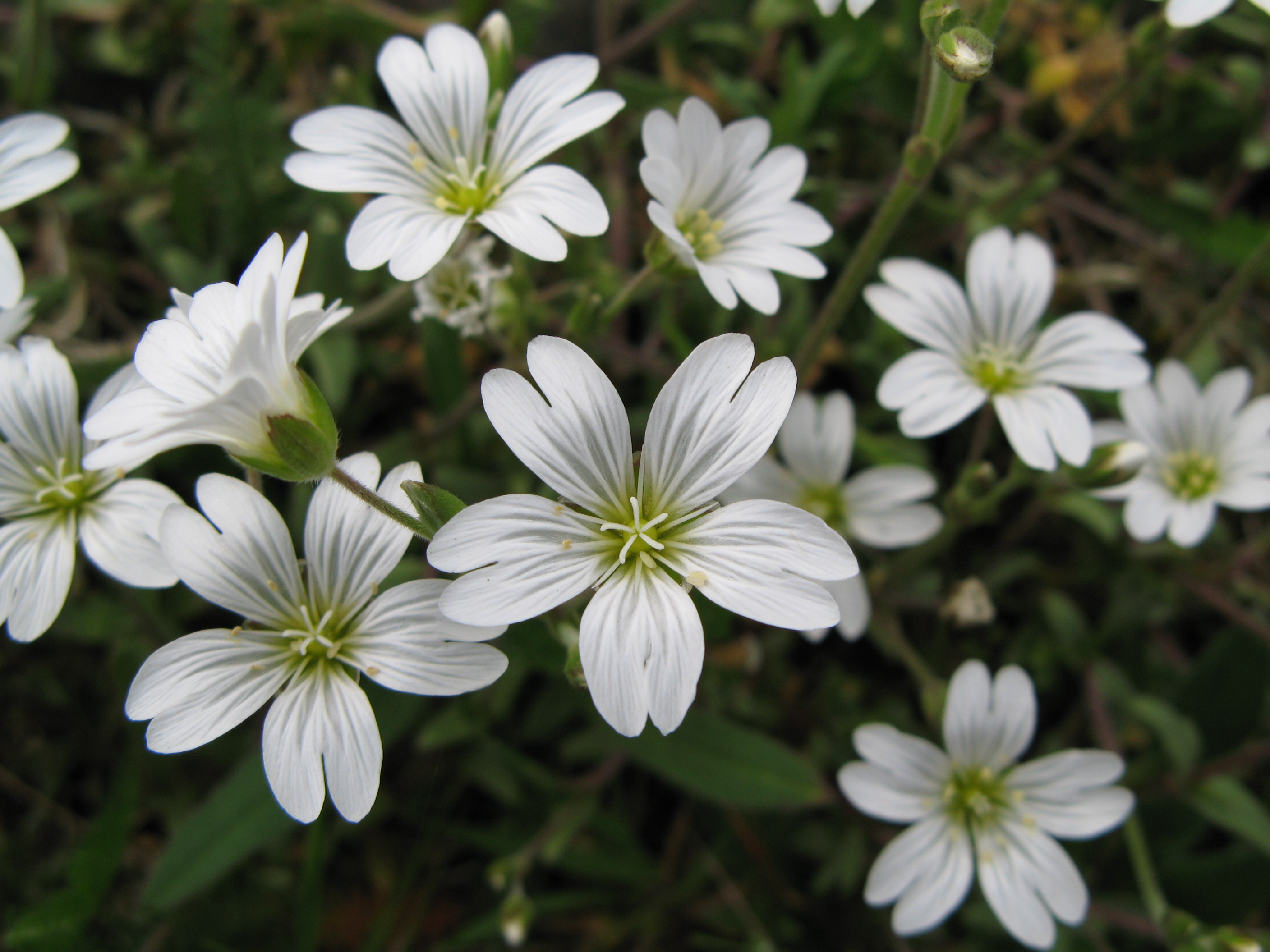
- Cerastium arvense

Scientific classification
- Kingdom: Plantae
- Clade: Embryophytes
- Clade: Tracheophytes
- Clade: Spermatophytes
- Clade: Angiosperms
- Clade: Eudicots
- Order: Caryophyllales
- Family: Caryophyllaceae
- Genus: Cerastium; L.

Species
- Over 200 - see text

Synonyms
- List: Centunculus Adans.; Esmarchia Rchb.; Leucodonium Opiz; Myosotis Mill.; Prevotia Adans.; Pseudocerastium C.Y.Wu, X.H.Guo & X.P.Zhang

= Cerastium =

Genus of flowering plants

Cerastium is a genus of annual, winter annual, or perennial flowering plants belonging to the family Caryophyllaceae. They are commonly called mouse-ears or mouse-ear chickweeds. There are 214 accepted species, found nearly worldwide but with the greatest concentration in the northern temperate regions. A number of the species are common weeds in fields and on disturbed ground.

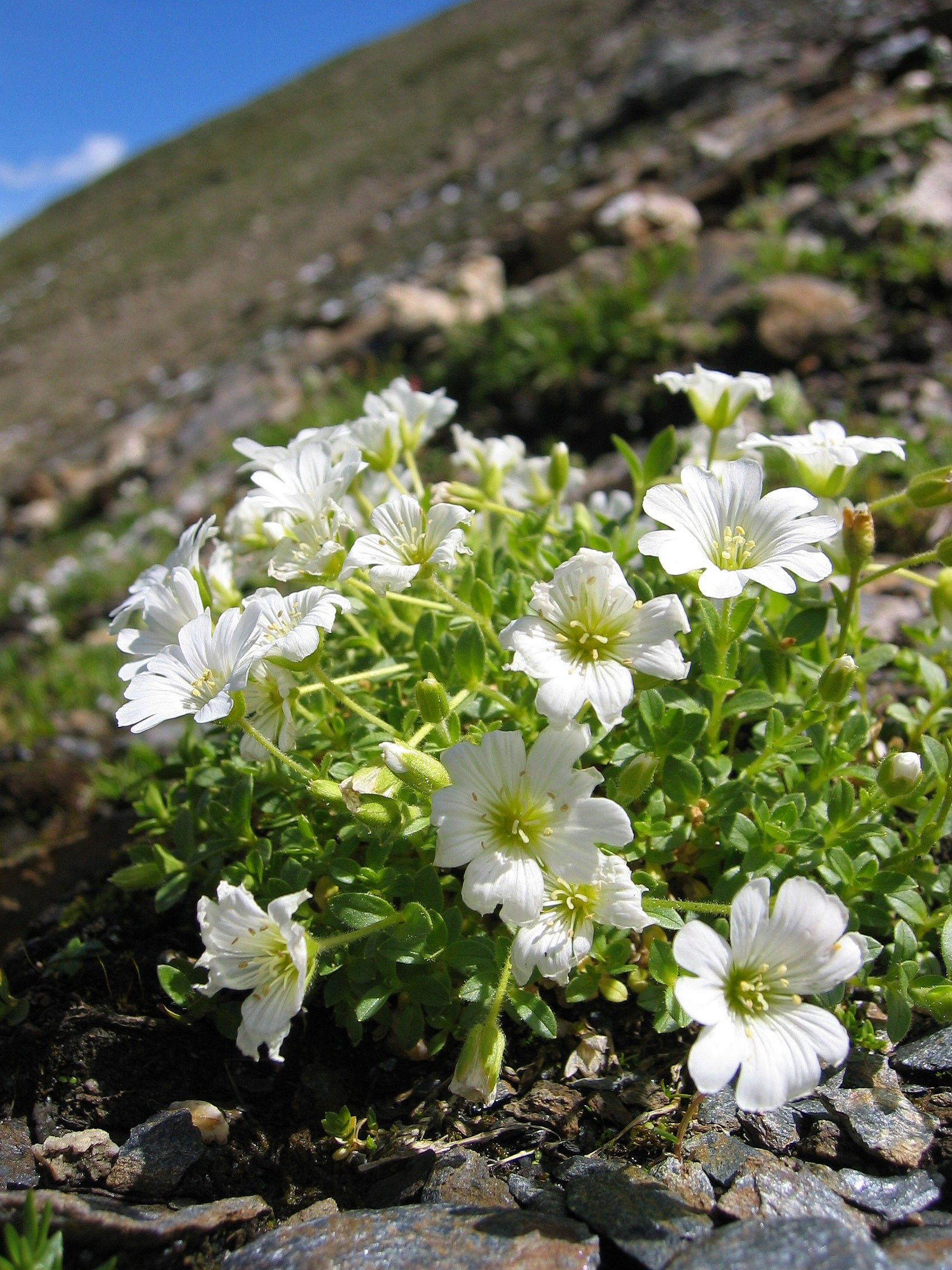
Cerastium uniflorum

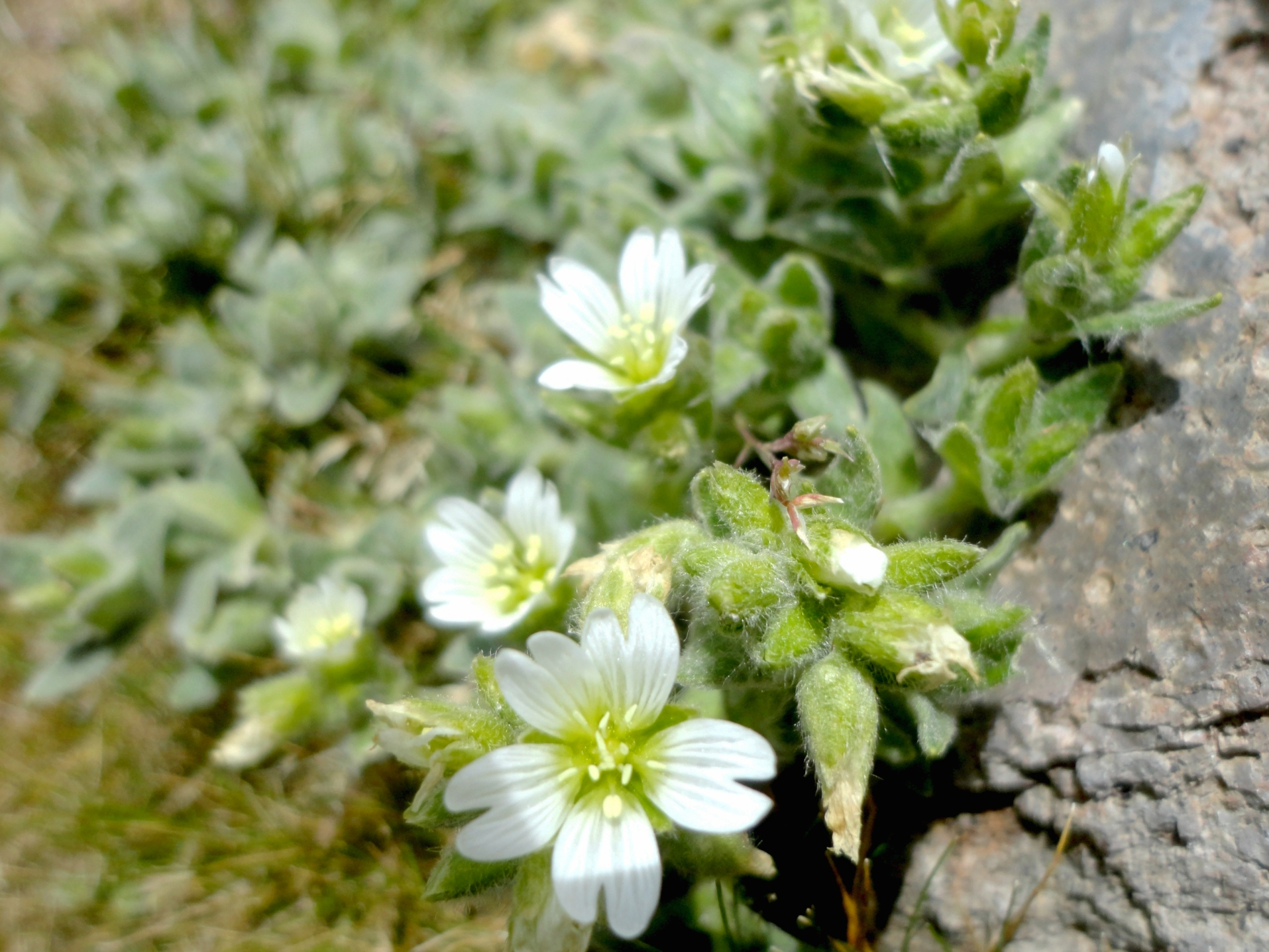
Cerastium tolucense

Cerastium species are used as food plants by the larvae of some Lepidoptera species including Coleophora chalcogrammella (which feeds exclusively on Cerastium arvense) and Coleophora striatipennella (which has been recorded on Cerastium fontanum).

== Species ==
The following species in the genus Cerastium have been described:

- Cerastium afromontanum T.C.E.Fr.
- Cerastium akiyoshiense Kadota
- Cerastium aleuticum Hultén – Aleutian chickweed
- Cerastium alexeenkoanum Schischk.
- Cerastium alpinum L. – alpine chickweed
- Cerastium alsinifolium Tausch
- Cerastium amanum P.H.Davis
- Cerastium andinum Benth.
- Cerastium apuanum Parl.
- Cerastium arabidis E.Mey. ex Fenzl
- Cerastium araraticum Rupr.
- Cerastium arcticum Lange – arctic mouse-ear chickweed
- Cerastium argenteum M.Bieb.
- Cerastium argentinum (Pax) F.N.Williams
- Cerastium armeniacum Gren.
- Cerastium arvense L. – field chickweed
- Cerastium atlanticum Durieu
- Cerastium axillare Correll – Trans-Pecos chickweed
- Cerastium azerbaijanicum Poursakhi, Assadi & F.Ghahrem.
- Cerastium azoricum Hochst. ex Seub.
- Cerastium baischanense Y.C.Chu
- Cerastium banaticum (Rochel) Heuff.
- Cerastium barberi B.L.Rob.
- Cerastium beeringianum Cham. & Schltdl. – Bering chickweed
- Cerastium behmianum Muschl.
- Cerastium bialynickii Tolm.
- Cerastium biebersteinii DC. – boreal chickweed
- Cerastium × blyttii Baenitz
- Cerastium boissierianum Greuter & Burdet
- Cerastium borisii Zakirov
- Cerastium brachypetalum Desp. ex Pers. – gray chickweed
- Cerastium brachypodum (Engelm. ex A.Gray) B.L.Rob. ex Britton – shortstalk chickweed
- Cerastium brevicarpicum Rusby
- Cerastium × brueggerianum Dalla Torre & Sarnth.
- Cerastium bulgaricum Uechtr.
- Cerastium cacananense Möschl
- Cerastium candicans Wedd.
- Cerastium candidissimum Correns
- Cerastium capense Sond.
- Cerastium capillatum I.V.Sokolova
- Cerastium carinthiacum Vest
- Cerastium caucasicum Fisch. ex Ser.
- Cerastium chlorifolium Fisch. & C.A.Mey.
- Cerastium comatum Desv.
- Cerastium commersonianum Ser.
- Cerastium consanguineum Wedd.
- Cerastium crassipes Bartl.
- Cerastium crassiusculum Klokov
- Cerastium cuatrecasasii Sklenář
- Cerastium cuchumatanense D.A.Good
- Cerastium cylindricum Poursakhi & Assadi
- Cerastium dagestanicum Schischk.
- Cerastium danguyi J.F.Macbr.
- Cerastium davuricum Fisch. ex Spreng.
- Cerastium decalvans Schloss. & Vuk.
- Cerastium deschatresii Greuter, N.Böhling & Ralf Jahn
- Cerastium dichotomum L. – forked chickweed
- Cerastium dicrotrichum Fenzl ex Rohrb.
- Cerastium diffusum Pers. – fourstamen chickweed
- Cerastium dinaricum Beck & Szyszył.
- Cerastium dominici Favarger
- Cerastium elbrusense Boiss.
- Cerastium elongatum Pursh
- Cerastium emesenum Mouterde
- Cerastium eriophorum Kit. ex Schult.
- Cerastium falcatum (Gren.) Bunge ex Fenzl
- Cerastium fastigiatum Greene
- Cerastium filifolium Vest
- Cerastium fischerianum Ser. – Fischer's chickweed
- Cerastium floccosum Benth.
- Cerastium fontanum Baumg. – common mouse-ear chickweed
- Cerastium fragillimum Boiss.
- Cerastium furcatum Cham. & Schltdl. – Korean mouse-ear chickweed
- Cerastium gibraltaricum Boiss.
- Cerastium glabratum (Wahlenb.) Hartm.
- Cerastium glomeratum Thuill. – sticky chickweed
- Cerastium gnaphalodes Fenzl
- Cerastium gracile Dufour – slender chickweed
- Cerastium grandiflorum Waldst. & Kit.
- Cerastium guatemalense Standl.
- Cerastium haussknechtii Boiss. & Hausskn.
- Cerastium hekuravense Jáv.
- Cerastium hemschinicum Schischk.
- Cerastium hieronymi Pax
- Cerastium hintoniorum B.L.Turner
- Cerastium holosteoides Fr. – common mouse-ear chickweed
- Cerastium huadingense Y.F.Lu, W.Y.Xie & X.F.Jin
- Cerastium humifusum Cambess.
- Cerastium ibukiense (Ohwi) Kadota
- Cerastium igoschiniae Pobed.
- Cerastium illyricum Ard.
- Cerastium imbricatum Kunth
- Cerastium inflatum Gren.
- Cerastium jiuhuashanense Gang Yao & J.W.Zhai
- Cerastium julicum Schellm.
- Cerastium junceum Möschl
- Cerastium juniperorum Standl. & Steyerm.
- Cerastium kasbek Parrot
- Cerastium krylovii Schischk. & Gorczak.
- Cerastium kunthii Briq.
- Cerastium lacaitae Barberis, Bechi & Miceli
- Cerastium × laestadianum H.Samzelius
- Cerastium lanceolatum (Poir.) Volponi
- Cerastium latifolium L.
- Cerastium lazicum Boiss.
- Cerastium ligusticum Viv.
- Cerastium limprichtii Pax & K.Hoffm.
- Cerastium lineare All.
- Cerastium lithospermifolium Fisch.
- Cerastium longifolium Willd.
- Cerastium macranthum Boiss.
- Cerastium macrocalyx Buschm.
- Cerastium madagascariense Pax
- Cerastium madrense S.Watson
- Cerastium malyi (T.Georgiev) Niketić
- Cerastium maximum L. – great chickweed
- Cerastium meridense Linden & Planch.
- Cerastium meyerianum Rupr.
- Cerastium microspermum C.A.Mey.
- Cerastium moesiacum Friv.
- Cerastium mollissimum Poir.
- Cerastium morrisonense Hayata
- Cerastium mucronatum Wedd.
- Cerastium multiflorum C.A.Mey.
- Cerastium nanhutashanense S.S.Ying
- Cerastium nanum Muschl.
- Cerastium nemorale M.Bieb.
- Cerastium neoscardicum Niketić
- Cerastium nigrescens (Edmondston ex H.C.Watson) H.C.Watson – Shetland mouse-ear chickweed
- Cerastium novoguinense Gilli
- Cerastium nutans Raf. – nodding chickweed
- Cerastium obovatum Larrañaga
- Cerastium octandrum Hochst. ex A.Rich.
- Cerastium odessanum Klokov
- Cerastium oreades Schischk.
- Cerastium orithales Schltdl.
- Cerastium × oxoniense Druce
- Cerastium papuanum Schltr. ex Mattf.
- Cerastium parvipetalum Hosok.
- Cerastium parvum (Pedersen) M.T.Sharples & E.A.Tripp
- Cerastium pauciflorum Steven ex Ser.
- Cerastium pedunculare Bory & Chaub.
- Cerastium pedunculatum Gaudin
- Cerastium perfoliatum L.
- Cerastium peruvianum Muschl.
- Cerastium pisidicum Ayasligil & Kit Tan
- Cerastium polymorphum Rupr.
- Cerastium ponticum Albov
- Cerastium porphyrii Schischk.
- Cerastium pospichalii Soldano & F.Conti
- Cerastium × pseudalpinum Murr
- Cerastium pumilum Curtis – European chickweed
- Cerastium purpurascens Adams
- Cerastium purpusii Greenm.
- Cerastium pusillum Ser.
- Cerastium qingliangfengicum H.W.Zhang & X.F.Jin
- Cerastium ramigerum Bartl.
- Cerastium ramosissimum Boiss.
- Cerastium rectum Friv.
- Cerastium regelii Ostenf. – Regel's chickweed
- Cerastium × richardsonii Druce
- Cerastium rivulare Cambess.
- Cerastium rivulariastrum Möschl & Pedersen
- Cerastium ruderale M.Bieb.
- Cerastium runemarkii Möschl & Rech.f.
- Cerastium saccardoanum Diratz.
- Cerastium scaposum Boiss. & Heldr.
- Cerastium scaranii Ten.
- Cerastium schizopetalum Maxim.
- Cerastium schmalhausenii Pacz.
- Cerastium selloi Schltdl. ex Rohrb.
- Cerastium semidecandrum L. – five-stamen chickweed
- Cerastium siculum Guss.
- Cerastium sinaloense D.A.Good
- Cerastium sinicum Nakai
- Cerastium smolikanum Hartvig
- Cerastium soleirolii Ser. ex Duby
- Cerastium soratense Rohrb.
- Cerastium sosnowskyi Schischk.
- Cerastium spathulatum Pers.
- Cerastium subciliatum Gartner
- Cerastium subpilosum Hayata
- Cerastium subspicatum Wedd.
- Cerastium subtetrandrum (Lange) Murb.
- Cerastium subtriflorum (Rchb.) Pancher – Slovenian mouse-ear chickweed
- Cerastium sugawarae Koidz. & Ohwi
- Cerastium supramontanum Arrigoni
- Cerastium sventenii Jalas
- Cerastium sylvaticum Waldst. & Kit.
- Cerastium × symei Druce
- Cerastium szechuense F.N.Williams
- Cerastium szowitsii Boiss.
- Cerastium takasagomontanum Masam.
- Cerastium taschkendicum Adylov & Vved.
- Cerastium tatrae Borbás
- Cerastium terrae-novae Fernald & Wiegand – Newfoundland mouse-ear chickweed
- Cerastium texanum Britton – Texas chickweed
- Cerastium theophrasti Merxm. & Strid
- Cerastium thomasii Ten.
- Cerastium thomsonii Hook.f.
- Cerastium tianschanicum Schischk.
- Cerastium tolucense D.A.Good
- Cerastium tomentosum L. – snow-in-summer
- Cerastium transsilvanicum Schur
- Cerastium trianae Briq.
- Cerastium trichocalyx Muschl.
- Cerastium × triculinum A.Nyár. & Prodan
- Cerastium tucumanense Pax
- Cerastium undulatifolium Sommier & Levier
- Cerastium uniflorum Clairv. - glacier mouse-ear
- Cerastium utriense Barberis
- Cerastium vagans Lowe
- Cerastium velutinum Raf.
- Cerastium venezuelanum Briq.
- Cerastium verecundum Ravenna
- Cerastium verticifolium R.L.Dang & X.M.Pi
- Cerastium viride A.Heller
- Cerastium viscatum (Montel.) Jalas
- Cerastium vourinense Möschl & Rech.f.
- Cerastium vulcanicum Schltdl.
- Cerastium wilhelmianum Sklenář
- Cerastium wilsonii Takeda
- Cerastium zhiguliense Saksonov
