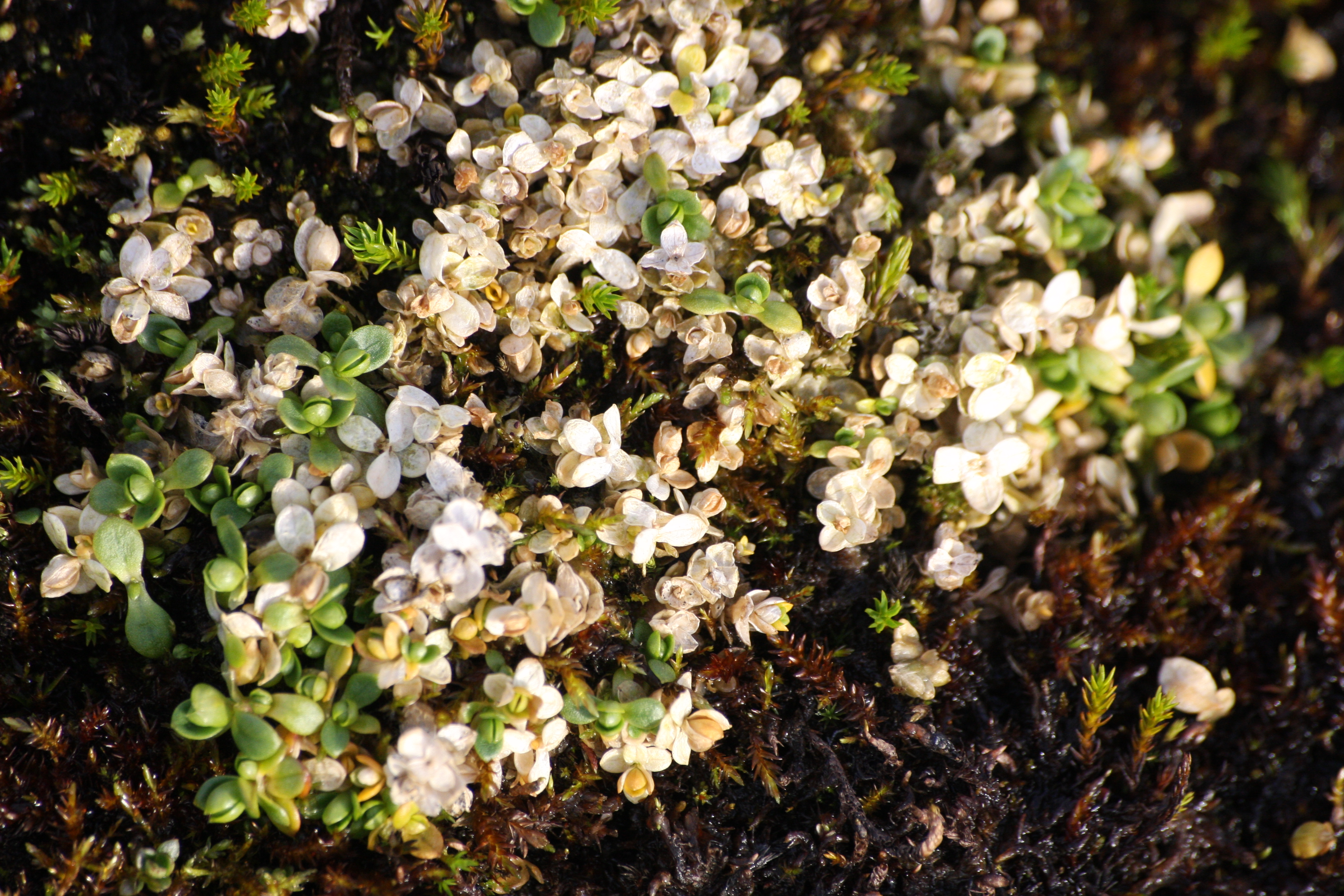

Scientific classification
- Kingdom: Plantae
- Clade: Tracheophytes
- Clade: Angiosperms
- Clade: Eudicots
- Order: Caryophyllales
- Family: Caryophyllaceae
- Genus: Cerastium
- Species: C. regelii

Binomial name
- Cerastium regelii Ostenf.

= Cerastium regelii =

Species of flowering plant

Cerastium regelii, commonly known as Regel's chickweed, is a species of perennial flowering plant belonging to the family Caryophyllaceae.

Its native range is subarctic.
