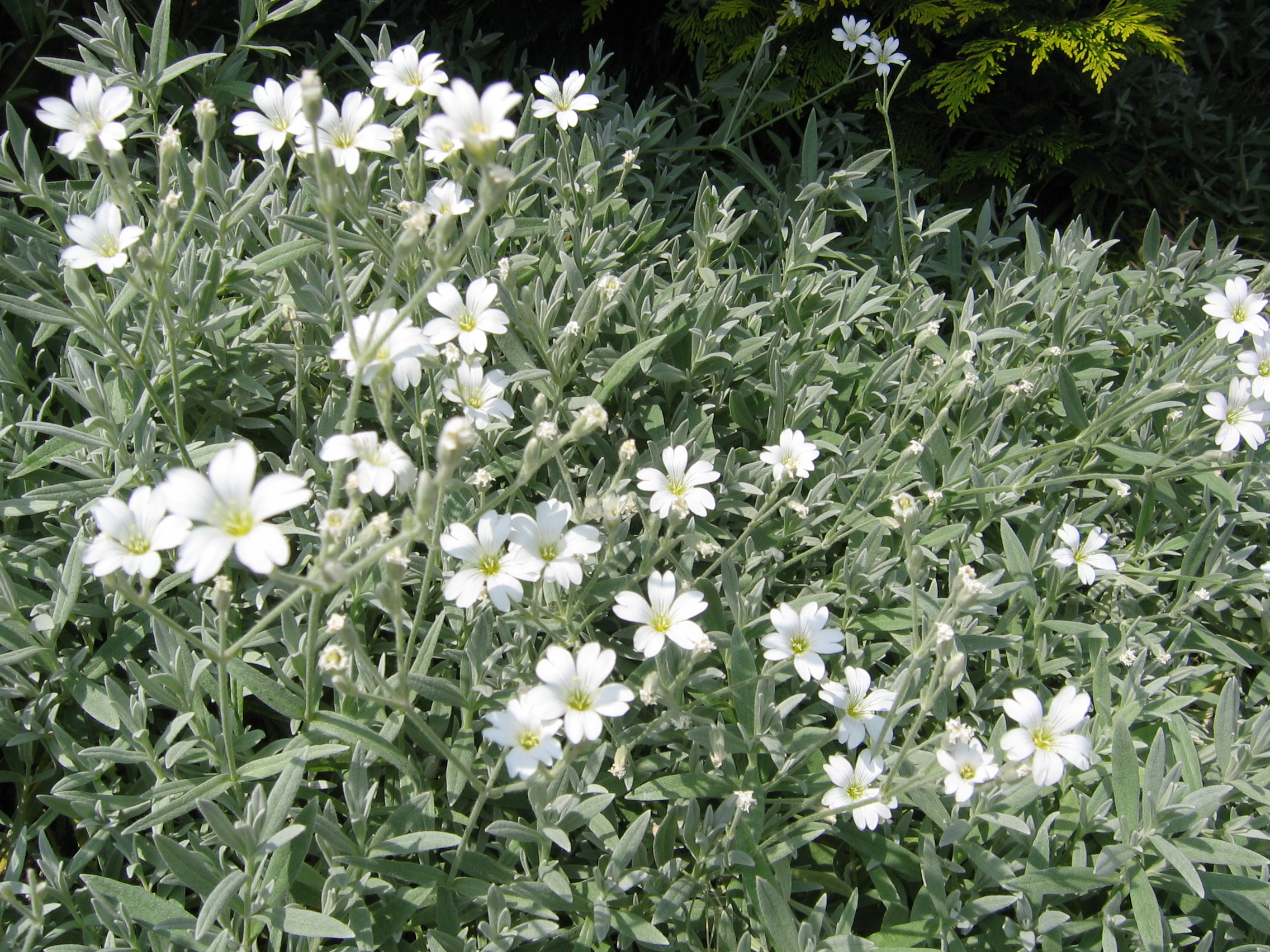

Scientific classification
- Kingdom: Plantae
- Clade: Tracheophytes
- Clade: Angiosperms
- Clade: Eudicots
- Order: Caryophyllales
- Family: Caryophyllaceae
- Genus: Cerastium
- Species: C. tomentosum

Binomial name
- Cerastium tomentosum L.

= Cerastium tomentosum =

Species of flowering plant in the carnation family

Cerastium tomentosum (snow-in-summer) is an herbaceous flowering plant and a member of the family Caryophyllaceae. It is generally distinguished from other species of its genus by "tomentose" or felty foliage. It is a low, spreading perennial native to the alpine regions of central and southern Italy. The stems and leaves are silvery-grey, whilst the flowers are star-like, white and about 15 mm (0.59 in) across.

== Description ==
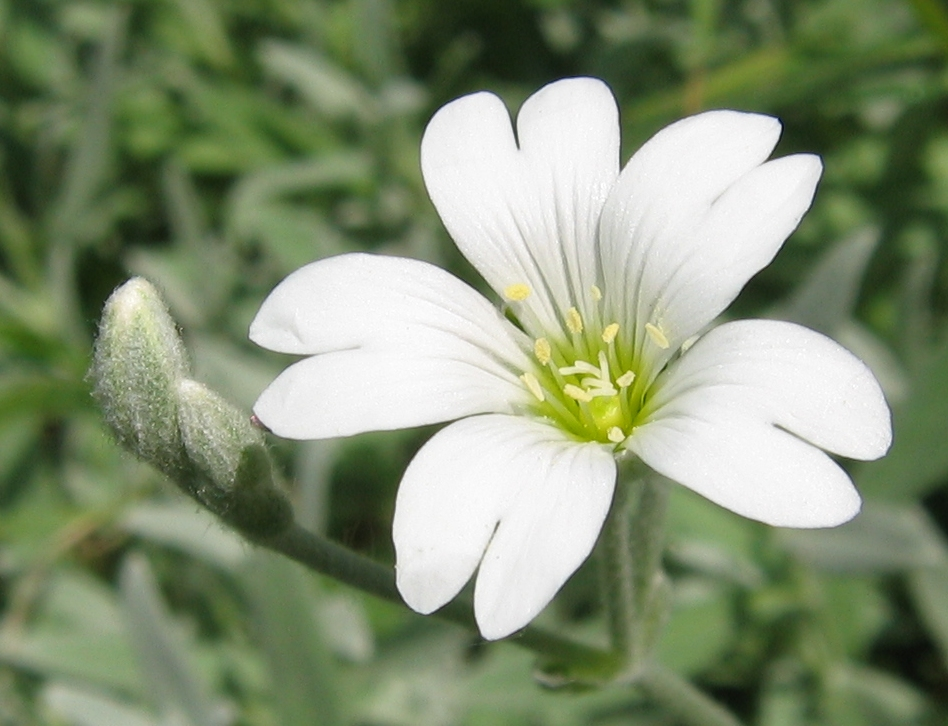
Flower close-up

It is an evergreen, creeping off-shoot, perennial, herbaceous plant that reaches heights of growth of 15 to 30 (rarely to 45) centimeters. It is overall densely hairy. The leaves are up to 30 millimetres long and linear to lanceolate, which are covered with silky, silvery, frizzy and entangled hairs, forming like whitish felting. The inflorescences consist of up to 15 flowers. The calyx is 5 to 7 millimetres long. The petals are white and twice as long as the calyx. The teeth of the capsule are slightly bent outwards. The flowering period is from May to July in the northern hemisphere, but may also bloom at other times of the year.

== Cultivation ==
It has proven popular as a cultivated ornamental and can be found in gardens the world over. It is a horticultural plant, perennial, rocky, forming dense silver carpets. This plant is not very demanding: it likes a poor soil, rich in gravel, well drained, in a sunny place. It spreads easily by its rhizomes.

== Range ==
It is native to Italy, from the central and southern Apennine Mountains to Sicily. It has naturalised elsewhere in Europe and in North America, where it is often subspontaneous.
