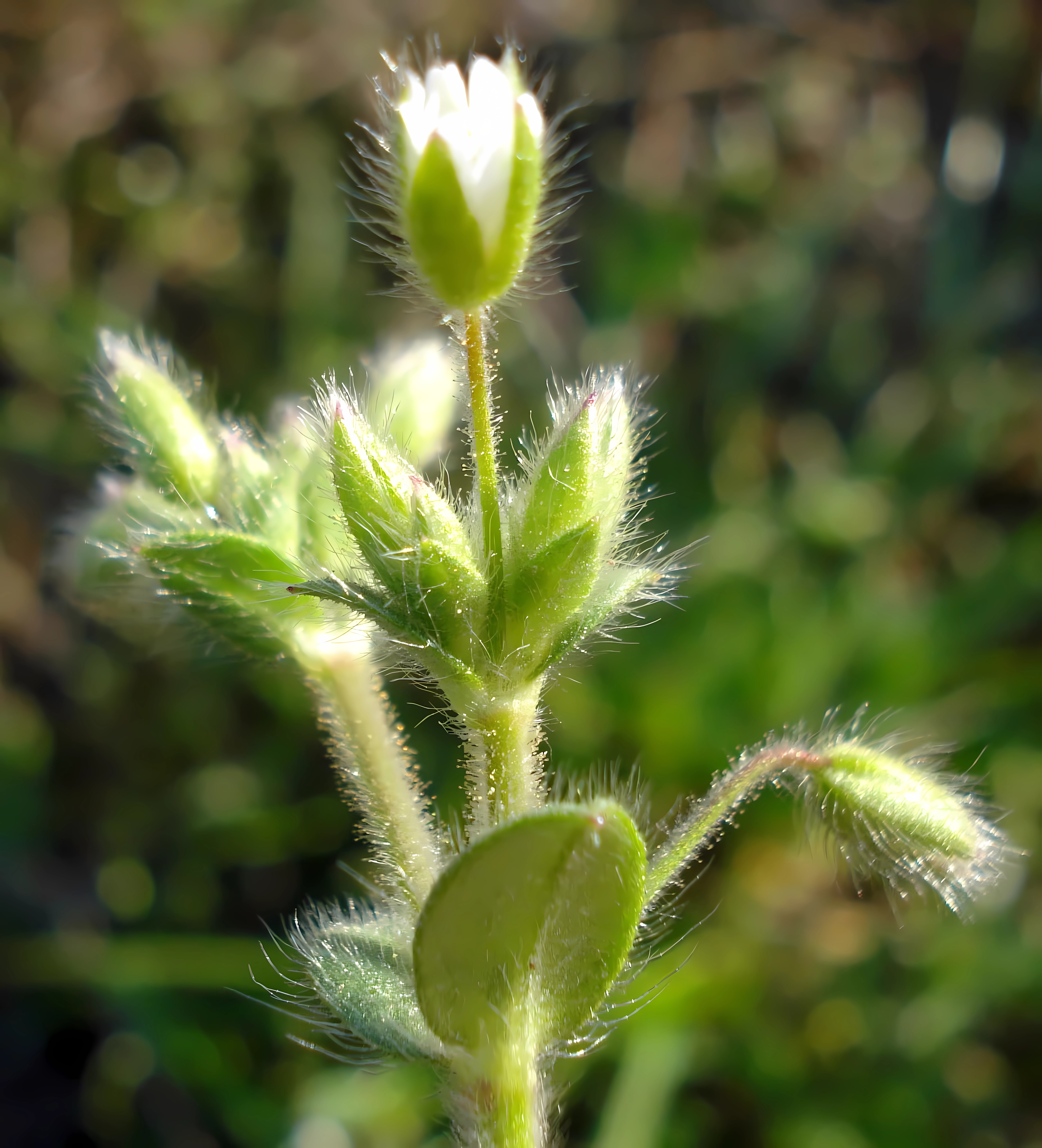

Scientific classification
- Kingdom: Plantae
- Clade: Embryophytes
- Clade: Tracheophytes
- Clade: Angiosperms
- Clade: Eudicots
- Order: Caryophyllales
- Family: Caryophyllaceae
- Genus: Cerastium
- Species: C. brachypetalum

Binomial name
- Cerastium brachypetalum Desp. ex Pers. (1805)

Subspecies
- 10; see text

Synonyms
- Alsine brachypetala (Desp. ex Pers.) E.H.L.Krause (1901), nom. illeg.; Cerastium mutabile var. brachypetalum (Desp. ex Pers.) Spenn. (1829); Cerastium vulgatum var. brachypetalum (Desp. ex Pers.) Roth (1827)

= Cerastium brachypetalum =

Species of flowering plant

Cerastium brachypetalum, commonly called gray chickweed, grey mouse-ear or gray mouse-ear chickweed, is a spring blooming annual plant species. It is native to Mediterranean and temperate Europe, the Caucasus, Western Asia, and northwestern Africa. It has been introduced and naturalized in North America.

Cerastium brachypetalum is one of 101 species deemed high priorities for conservation in the UK by the wild flower and plant charity Plantlife.

== Subspecies ==
Ten subspecies are accepted.

- Cerastium brachypetalum subsp. atheniense (Lonsing) P.D.Sell & Whitehead – Greece (Attica)
- Cerastium brachypetalum subsp. balearicum Romo – Balearic Islands
- Cerastium brachypetalum subsp. brachypetalum – France to central Europe, Scandinavia, southeastern Europe, and Morocco
- Cerastium brachypetalum subsp. corcyrense (Möschl) P.D.Sell & Whitehead – northwestern Greece (Corfu)
- Cerastium brachypetalum subsp. doerfleri (Halácsy ex Hayek) P.D.Sell & Whitehead – Crete
- Cerastium brachypetalum subsp. iranicum Poursakhi, Assadi & F.Ghahrem. – Iran
- Cerastium brachypetalum subsp. pindigenum (Lonsing) P.D.Sell & Whitehead – Albania and northern and central Greece
- Cerastium brachypetalum subsp. roeseri (Boiss. & Heldr.) Nyman – Morocco and Algeria, Mediterranean Europe from Spain to Bulgaria, Turkey, and Cyprus
- Cerastium brachypetalum subsp. tauricum (Spreng.) Murb. – Morocco, Mediterranean Europe, Crimea, Turkey, the Caucasus, and Western Asia
- Cerastium brachypetalum subsp. tenoreanum (Ser.) Soó – France to Czechoslovakia, Greece, and Bulgaria
