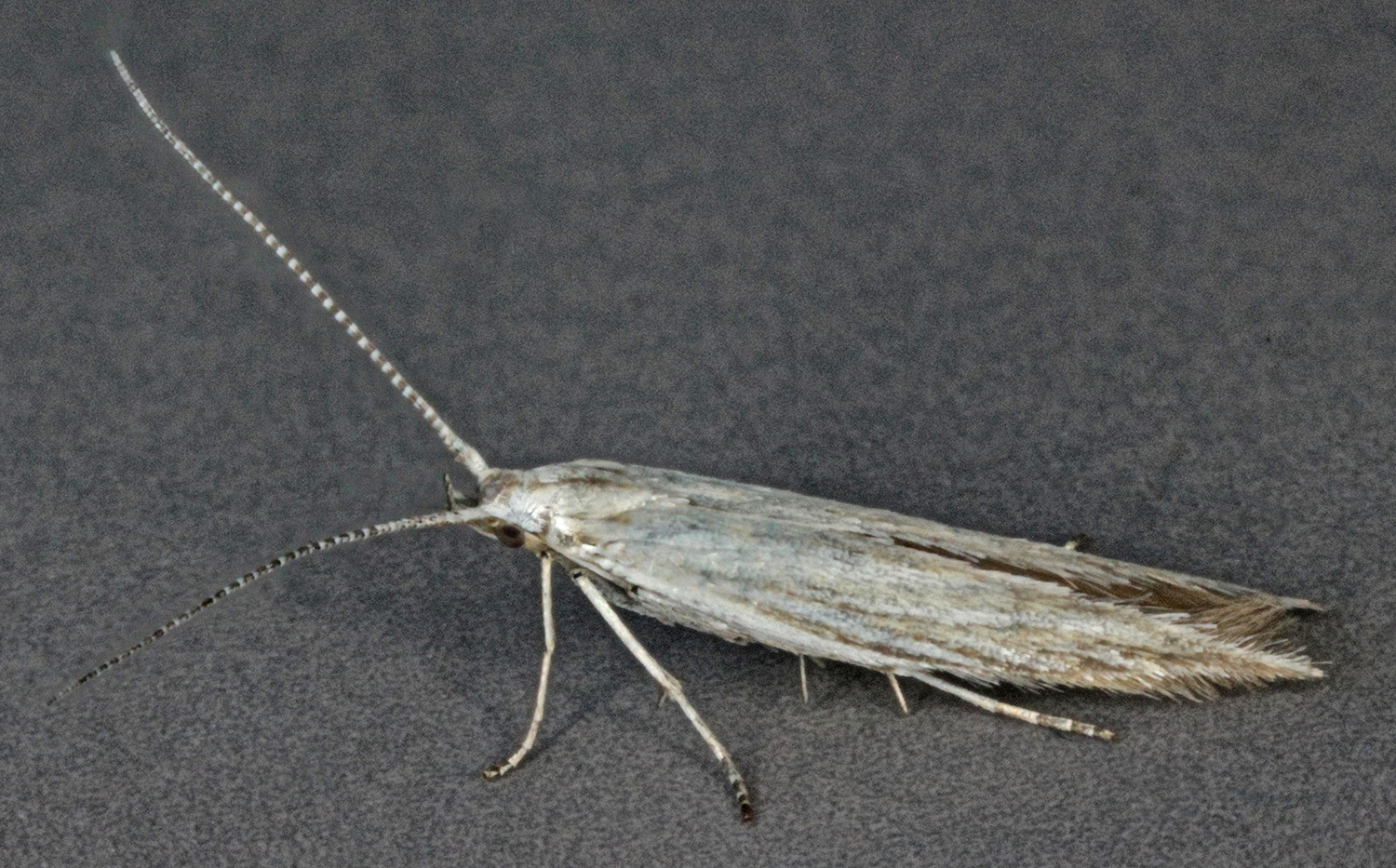
- Coleophora striatipennella North Wales

Scientific classification
- Kingdom: Animalia
- Phylum: Arthropoda
- Clade: Pancrustacea
- Class: Insecta
- Order: Lepidoptera
- Family: Coleophoridae
- Genus: Coleophora
- Species: C. striatipennella

Binomial name
- Coleophora striatipennella Nylander, 1848

Synonyms
- Coleophora apicella Stainton, 1858; Coleophora cacuminatella Doubleday, 1859; Coleophora lineolea Meyrick, 1928 (non Haworth, 1828: preoccupied); Casignetella striatipennella

= Coleophora striatipennella =

Species of moth

Coleophora striatipennella is a moth of the family Coleophoridae that is found in Europe and Near East. It has been introduced to New Zealand.

== Description ==
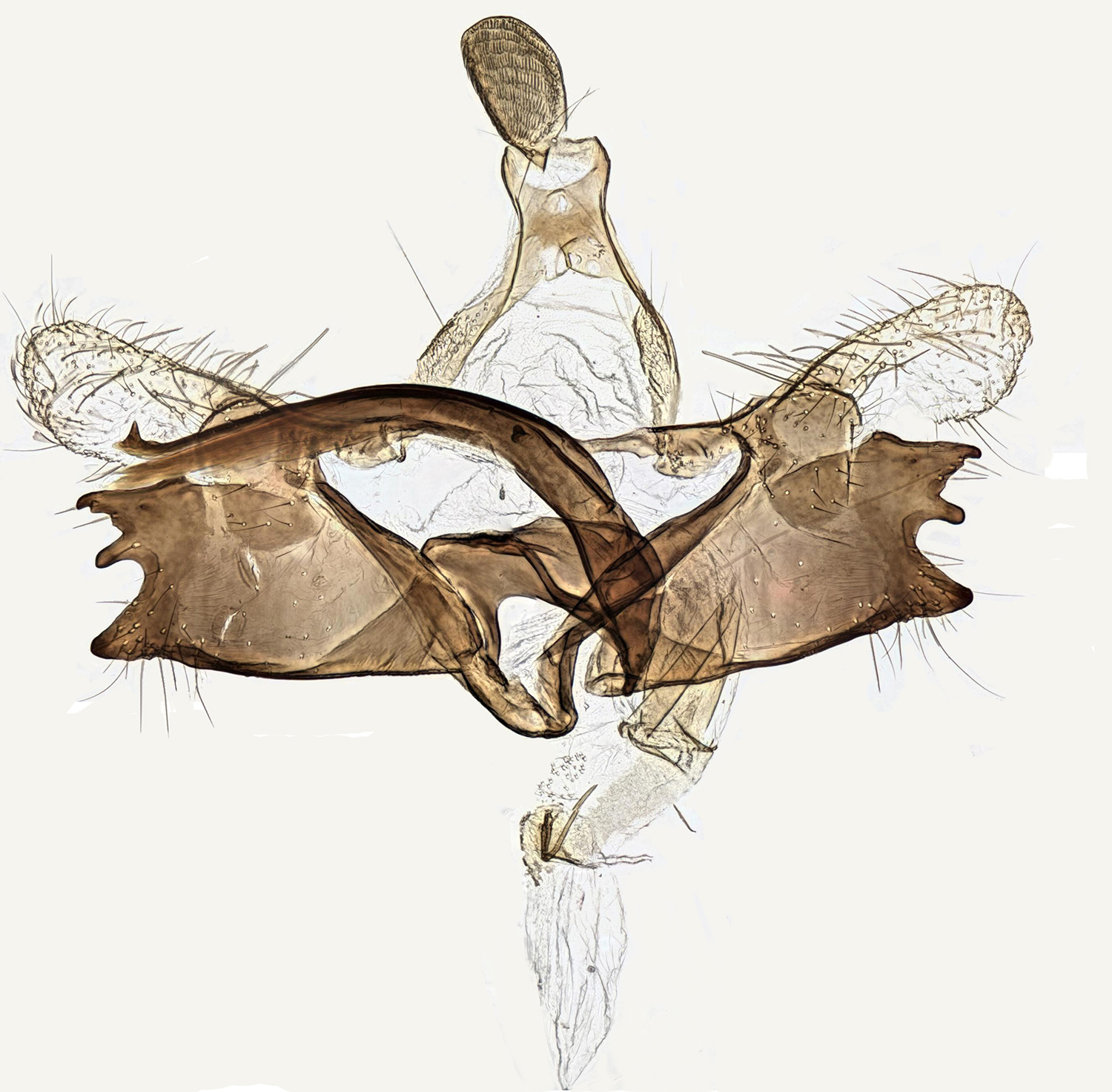
Genitalia preparation

The wingspan of 11–13 millimetres (0.43–0.51 in). Coleophora species have narrow blunt to pointed forewings and a weakly defined tornus. The hindwings are narrow-elongate and very long-fringed. The upper surfaces have neither a discal spot nor transverse lines. Each abdomen segment of the abdomen has paired patches of tiny spines which show through the scales. The resting position is horizontal with the front end raised and the cilia give the hind tip a frayed and upturned look if the wings are rolled around the body. C. striatipennella characteristics include head ochreous-white. Antennae white, ringed with fuscous, basal joint loosely haired. Forewings white; all veins marked by indistinct whitish -ochreous streaks, towards costa posteriorly and in apex mixed with fuscous. Hindwings grey.

== Behavior ==
Adults are on wing from May to August. There are one to two generation per year.

The larvae feed on seeds of Stellaria graminea, Stellaria media and Cerastium fontanum.
