= Cerastium ligusticum =

Scientific classification
- Kingdom: Plantae
- Clade: Tracheophytes
- Clade: Angiosperms
- Clade: Eudicots
- Order: Caryophyllales
- Family: Caryophyllaceae
- Genus: Cerastium
- Species: C. ligusticum

Binomial name
- Cerastium ligusticum Viv.

Subspecies
- 4; see text

Synonyms
- Cerastium campanulatum Viv.

Species of plant

Cerastium ligusticum is a species of annual herb in the family Caryophyllaceae. It is native to the central Mediterranean, from Corsica and Sardinia through Sicily and Italy to Albania and Montenegro. They have a self-supporting growth form. They have simple, broad leaves. Individuals can grow to 0.11 m.

Four subspecies are accepted.

- Cerastium ligusticum subsp. granulatum (Huter, Porta & Rigo) P.D.Sell & Whitehead – southern Italy
- Cerastium ligusticum subsp. ligusticum – Corsica, peninsular Italy, Sicily, and Malta
- Cerastium ligusticum subsp. palustre (Moris) P.D.Sell & Whitehead – Sardinia
- Cerastium ligusticum subsp. trichogynum (Möschl) P.D.Sell & Whitehead – Albania and Montenegro

== Sources ==
This article incorporates text from a free content work. Licensed under CC0 (license statement/permission). Text taken from Cerastium ligusticum. Encyclopedia of Life.
