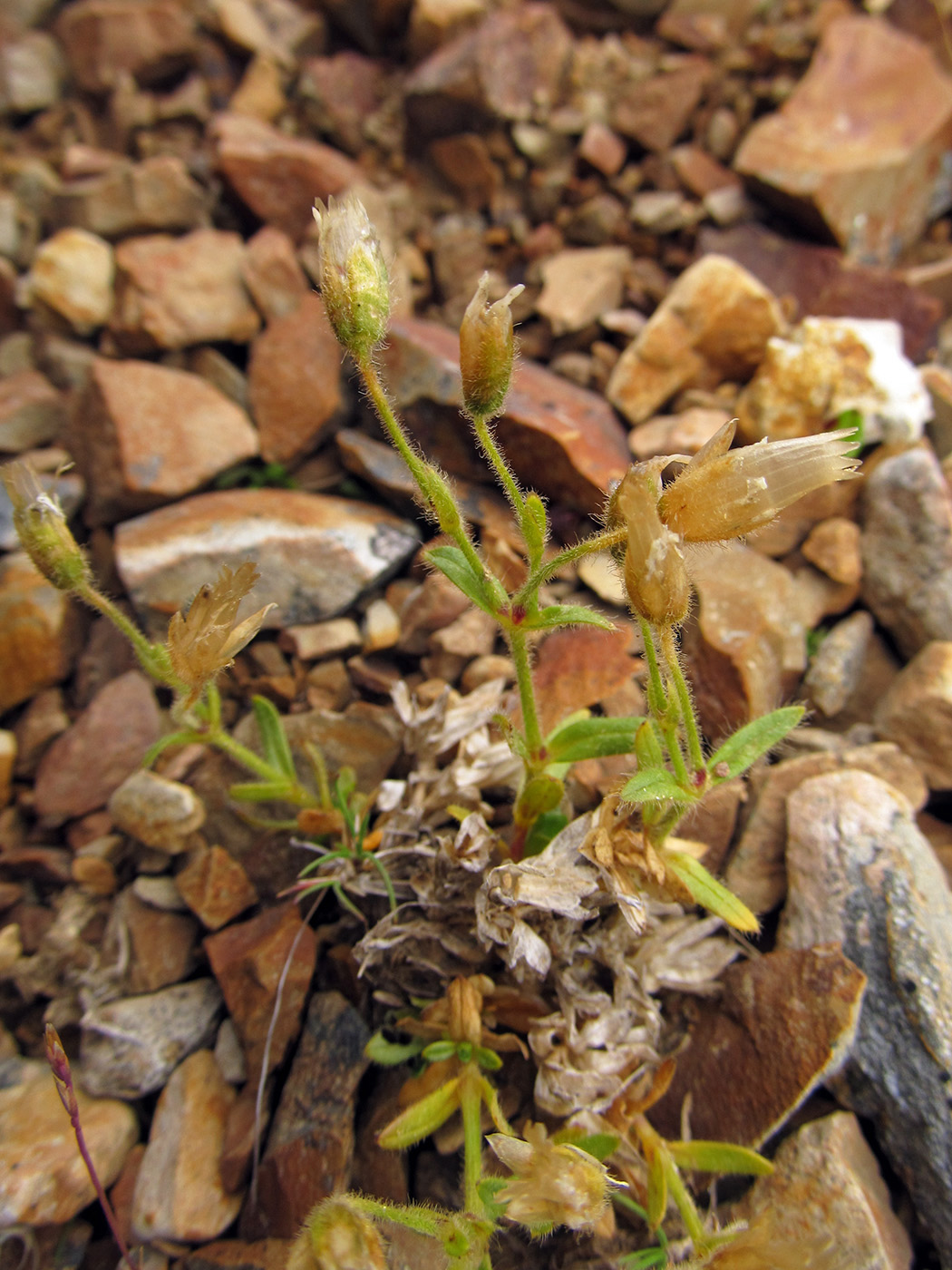

Scientific classification
- Kingdom: Plantae
- Clade: Tracheophytes
- Clade: Angiosperms
- Clade: Eudicots
- Order: Caryophyllales
- Family: Caryophyllaceae
- Genus: Cerastium
- Species: C. aleuticum

Binomial name
- Cerastium aleuticum Hultén

Synonyms
- Cerastium beeringianum var. aleuticum (Hultén) S.L. Welsh

= Cerastium aleuticum =

Aleutian mouse-ear chickweed

Species of flowering plant in the pink family

Cerastium aleuticum, common name Aleutian mouse-ear chickweed, is a plant species endemic to the US State of Alaska. It is found only on islands, not on the Alaskan mainland: Aleutian, St. Lawrence, St. Paul, Popof, and Kodiak Islands. It is found on rocky slopes and mountainsides up to an elevation of 700 m (2,300 ft).

Cerastium aleuticum is a perennial herb spreading by means of underground rhizomes. Stems are branched, up to 7 cm (2.8 in) long, covered with soft hairs. Flowers are single or in groups of 2 or 3, white. Capsules are cylindrical, up to 11 mm long.
