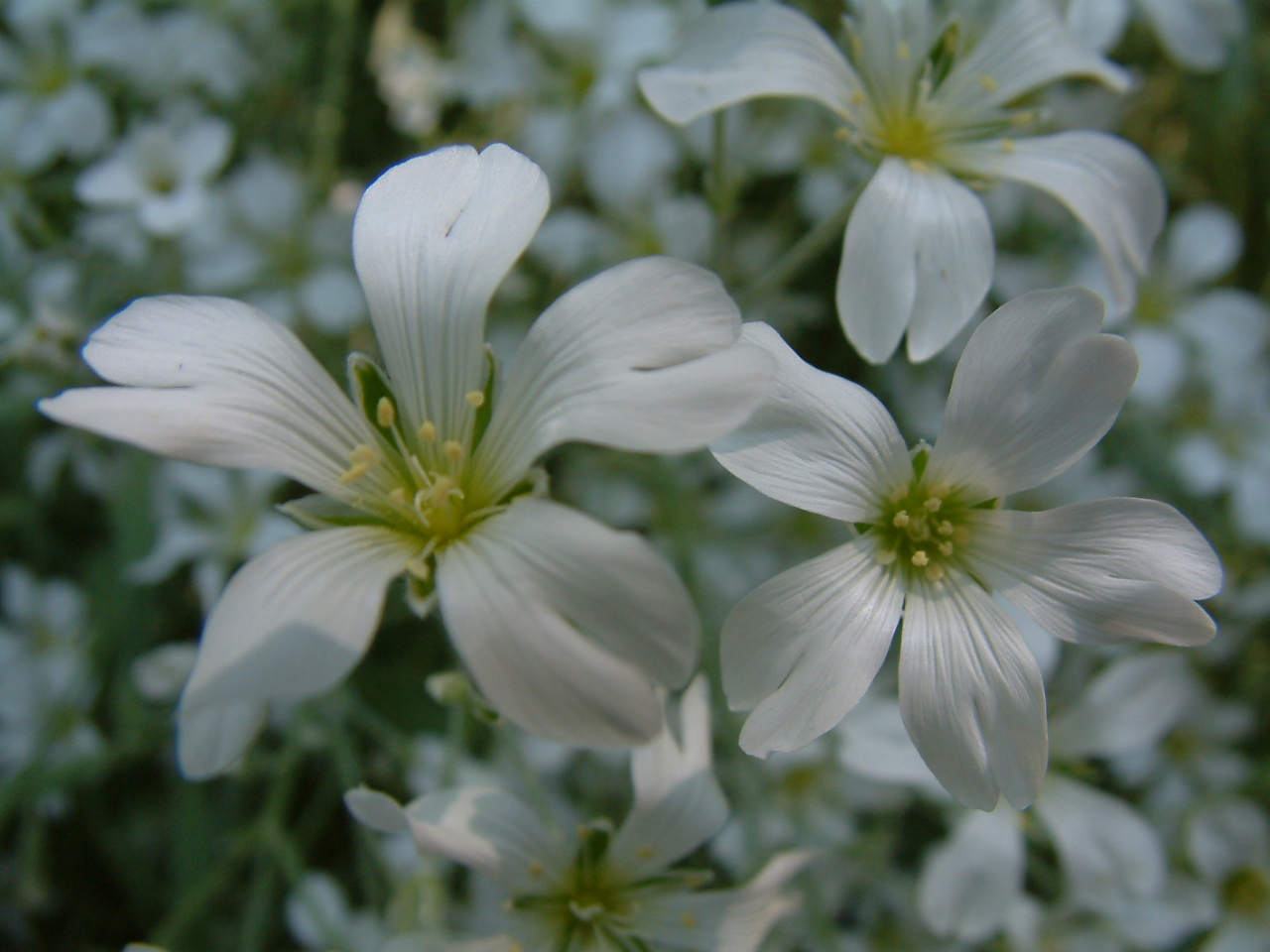

Scientific classification
- Kingdom: Plantae
- Clade: Tracheophytes
- Clade: Angiosperms
- Clade: Eudicots
- Order: Caryophyllales
- Family: Caryophyllaceae
- Genus: Cerastium
- Species: C. biebersteinii

Binomial name
- Cerastium biebersteinii DC.

= Cerastium biebersteinii =

Species of flowering plant in the pink family

Cerastium biebersteinii, the boreal chickweed, is an ornamental plant in the genus Cerastium and the family Caryophyllaceae. It is an endemic of the Crimea. The species is named after a German botanist Friedrich August Marschall von Bieberstein.

== Description ==
The plant is perennial and herbaceous. The stem is 15–25 centimeters (5.9–9.8 in) high.

The leaves are whitish and tomentose, flat or linear prolonged, a bit acute, smooth-edged 0.2–3 centimeters long and 1–9 millimeters wide.

The flowers are white, 1.5–2.2 centimeters in diameter, situated in cymes on top of the sprout. Blooming period is from the end of April to the end of May.

== Habitat ==
The Crimea is the unique natural habitat of this plant. It is also present in Crimean yayla grass.

== Preservation ==
The species is included into the Red Book of Ukraine, the Red Book of Crimea, and the European Red List. It is preserved and grown on the territory of such environmental facilities as the Crimean Nature Reserve, the Yalta Mountain-Forest Nature Reserve, and the Qarabiy yayla mountain range.

== Uses ==
The plant is used for ornamental purposes.
