= Cerastium sventenii =

Conservation status
- Endangered (IUCN 3.1)

Scientific classification
- Kingdom: Plantae
- Clade: Tracheophytes
- Clade: Angiosperms
- Clade: Eudicots
- Order: Caryophyllales
- Family: Caryophyllaceae
- Genus: Cerastium
- Species: C. sventenii

Binomial name
- Cerastium sventenii Jalas

Species of flowering plant in the pink family

Cerastium sventenii is a species of flowering plant in the family Caryophyllaceae. It is endemic to the Canary Islands. It grows in moist talus in forested habitat. It is threatened by introduced grazing herbivores and non-native plants.
