= Cerastium glomeratum =

Scientific classification
- Kingdom: Plantae
- Clade: Embryophytes
- Clade: Tracheophytes
- Clade: Spermatophytes
- Clade: Angiosperms
- Clade: Eudicots
- Order: Caryophyllales
- Family: Caryophyllaceae
- Genus: Cerastium
- Species: C. glomeratum

Binomial name
- Cerastium glomeratum Thuill.

Species of flowering plant in the pink family

Cerastium glomeratum is a species of flowering plant in the family Caryophyllaceae known by the common names sticky mouse-ear chickweed and clammy chickweed. It is native to Europe, Macaronesia to Assam but is known on most continents as an introduced species. It grows in many types of habitat. The blooming period is February, March, April, and May.

== Description ==
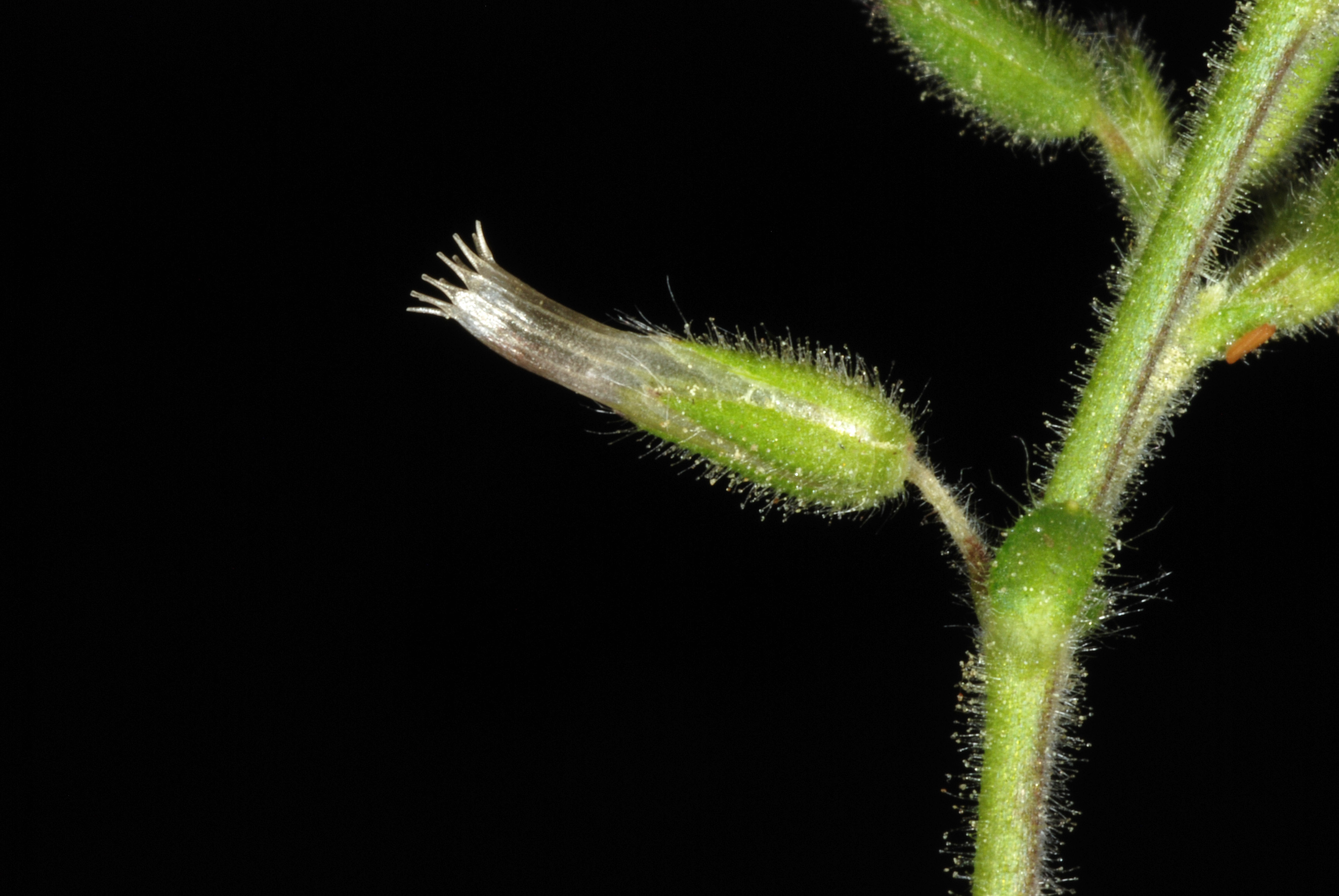
The upper stem and flowers are covered in glandular hairs.

This is an annual herb growing from a slender taproot. It produces a branched stem up to 45 centimeters (18 in) tall, with abundant glandular and non-glandular hairs. The leaves are opposite, hairy, up to 2 cm long, and the basal ones typically die back before flowering. The bracts are green, hairy and generally similar to the leaves.

The inflorescence bears as few as 3 or as many as 50 small, dioecious flowers arranged in a cyme and borne on very short pedicels. Each flower has 5 hairy green sepals which are occasionally red-tipped, and 5 white bifid petals which are a few millimeters long and generally about the same length as the sepals. The fruit is a capsule less than a centimeter long which is tipped with ten tiny teeth.

== Identification ==
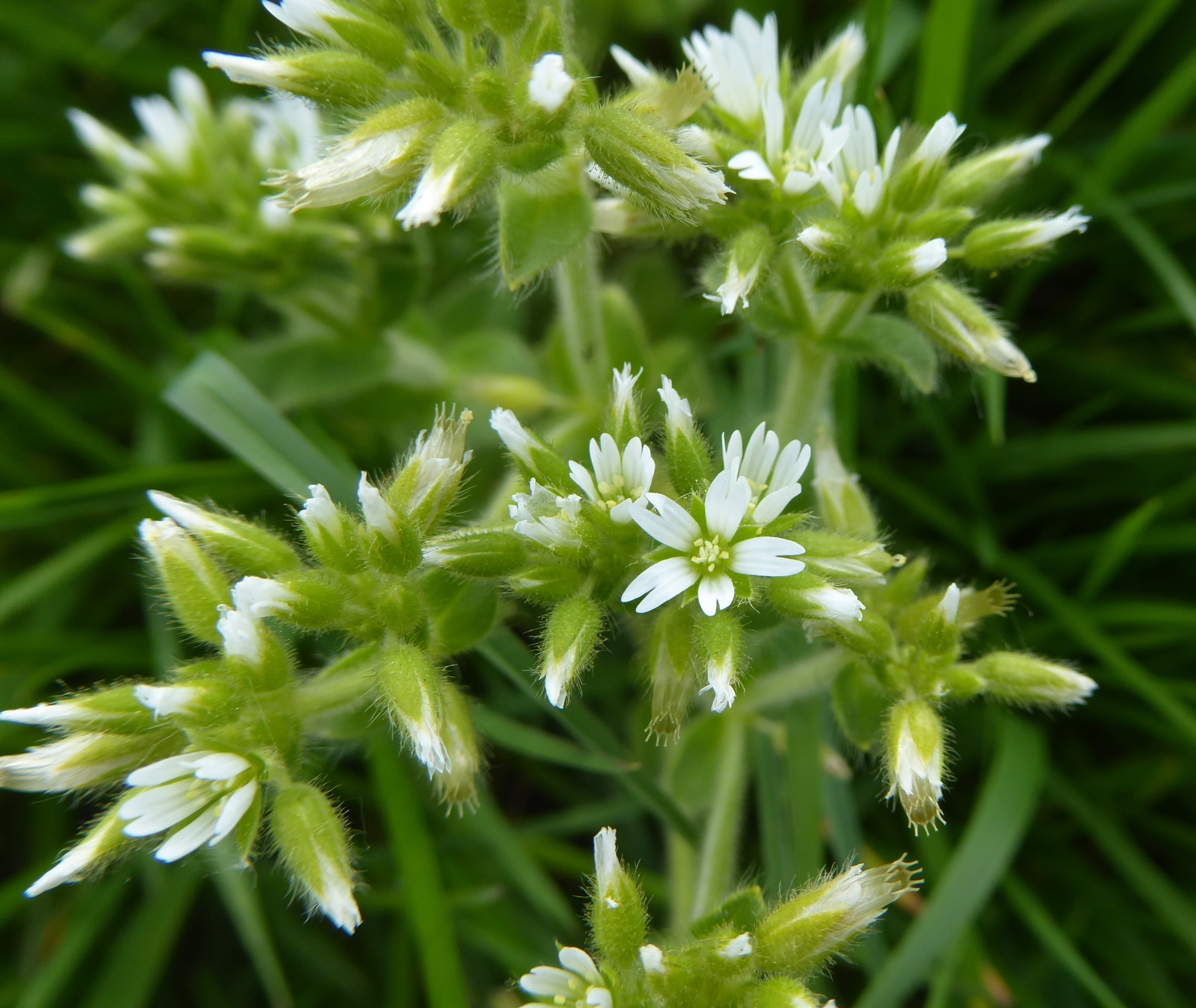
The flowers of sticky mouse-ear are often bunched together, on short stalks.

This plant usually has abundant glandular hairs towards the top of the stem and on the sepals. Because it is an annual, plants are easily uprooted and every stem develops flowers. The flowers are also borne on very short pedicels (stalks), so they tend to occur in tight clusters.

== Taxonomy ==
It was named by Jean Louis Thuillier in his "Flore des Environs de Paris" (1800). Many synonyms have been coined over the years, which are listed in the Synonymic Checklists of the Vascular plants of the World. Many forms, varieties and subspecies have also been named, but none is now widely accepted. It is not known to hybridise with any other species.

Its chromosome number is 2n=72.

== Habitat ==
Frequent in waste places, walls, banks and arable land.

== Uses ==
The leaves and shoots were used as a wild food in ancient China. In Nepal, the juice of this plant was applied to the forehead to relieve headaches. The juice could also be dropped into the nostrils to treat nosebleeds.

The leaves can also be boiled and eaten.
