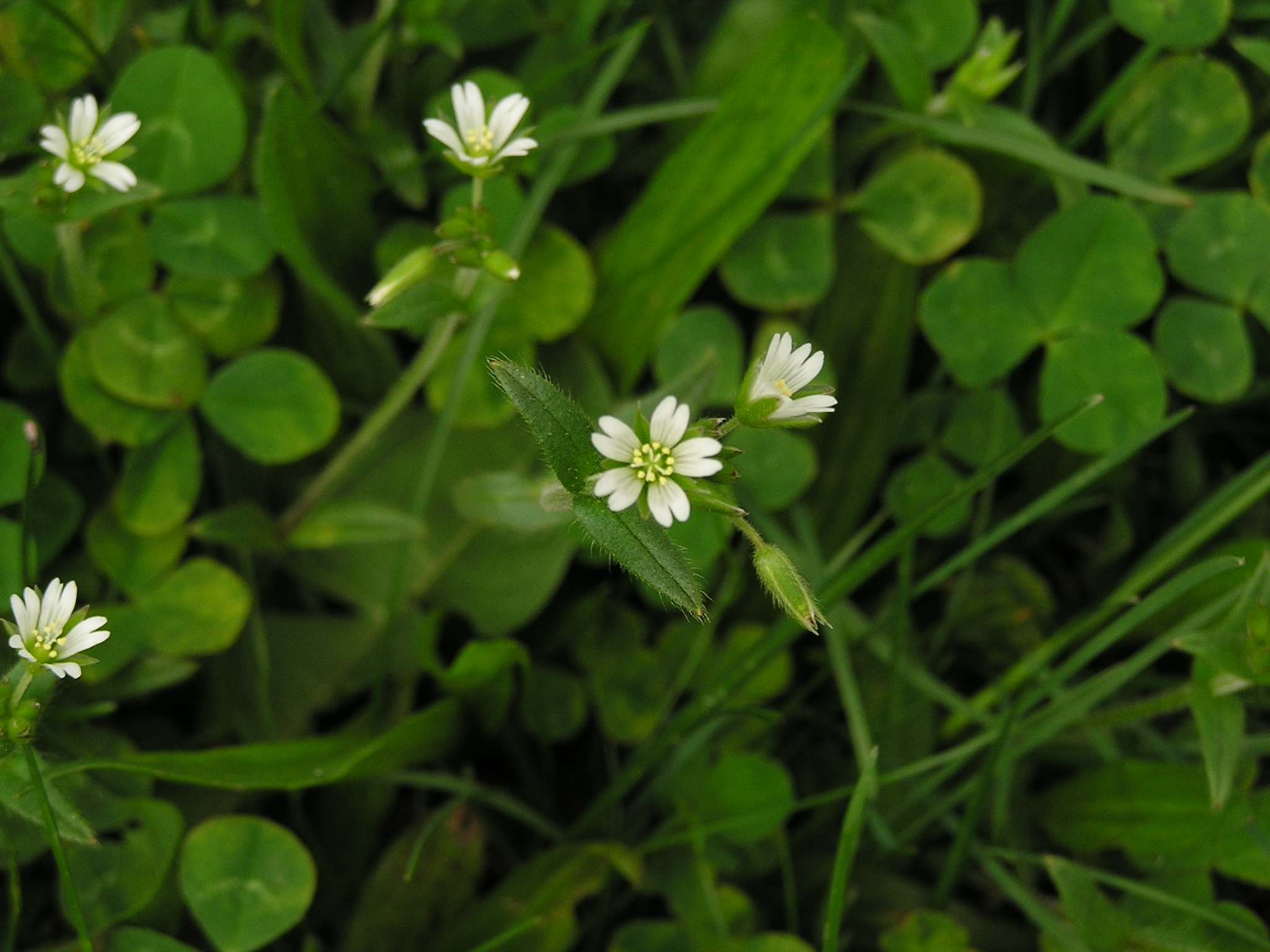

Scientific classification
- Kingdom: Plantae
- Clade: Tracheophytes
- Clade: Angiosperms
- Clade: Eudicots
- Order: Caryophyllales
- Family: Caryophyllaceae
- Genus: Cerastium
- Species: C. holosteoides

Binomial name
- Cerastium holosteoides Fr.

Synonyms
- List: Cerastium alpestre Schur; Cerastium alpigenum Schur; Cerastium andinum Phil.; Cerastium caespitosum var. montevidense (Rohrb.) Malme; Cerastium caespitosum var. pseudoalpestre Bech.; Cerastium connatum L.C.Beck; Cerastium fontanum var. eglandulosum Gartner; Cerastium fontanum var. glandulosum Gartner; Cerastium fontanum var. glandulosum (Boenn.) P.D.Sell; Cerastium fontanum f. glutinosum (Möschl) M.B.Wyse Jacks.; Cerastium fontanum f. gracile (Hayek) M.B.Wyse Jacks.; Cerastium fontanum f. holosteoides (Fr.) M.B.Wyse Jacks.; Cerastium fontanum subsp. holosteoides (Fr.) Salman, Ommering & de Voo; Cerastium fontanum var. lucens (Druce) P.D.Sell; Cerastium fontanum subsp. scandicum Gartner; Cerastium fontanum var. tibeticum (Edgew. & Hook.f.) C.Y.Wu & L.H.Zhou; Cerastium fontanum var. vulgare (Hartm.) M.B.Wyse Jacks.; Cerastium fontanum subsp. vulgare (Hartm.) Greuter & Burdet; Cerastium glandulosum (Boenn.) Schur; Cerastium holosteoides var. glabrescens (G.Mey.) Hyl.; Cerastium holosteoides subsp. glandulosum (Boenn.) I.V.Sokolova; Cerastium holosteoides subsp. serpentini (Novák) Dostál; Cerastium holosteoides var. vulgare (Hartm.) Hyl.; Cerastium holosteoides subsp. vulgare (Hartm.) Buttler; Cerastium macrocarpum Steven ex Ledeb.; Cerastium malachiforme Schur; Cerastium minus Schur; Cerastium pseudosylvaticum Schur; Cerastium scandicum (Gartner) Kuzen.; Cerastium sylvaticum Opiz; Cerastium uliginosum Hegetschw.; Cerastium viscidum Christm.; Cerastium viscosum L.; Cerastium viscosum var. elongatum Hook.; Cerastium viscosum var. glabrescens G.Mey.; Cerastium viscosum var. glandulosum Boenn.; Cerastium vulgare Hartm.; Cerastium vulgare var. holosteoides (Fr.) Fr.; Cerastium vulgatum var. americanum Ser.; Cerastium vulgatum var. andinum A.Gray; Cerastium vulgatum f. lucens Druce; Cerastium vulgatum var. montevidense Rohrb.; Cerastium vulgatum var. peruvianum A.Gray; Stellaria viscosa Link

= Cerastium holosteoides =

Species of flowering plant

Cerastium holosteoides, the common mouse-ear chickweed, is a species of flowering plant belonging to the family Caryophyllaceae.

Its native range is temperate and subarctic areas of the Old World; scattered countries in Africa, nearly all of Eurasia to New Guinea. One of the world's most widespread weeds, it has been introduced to most of North America, the western countries of South America, New Zealand, South Africa, and many islands around the world.
