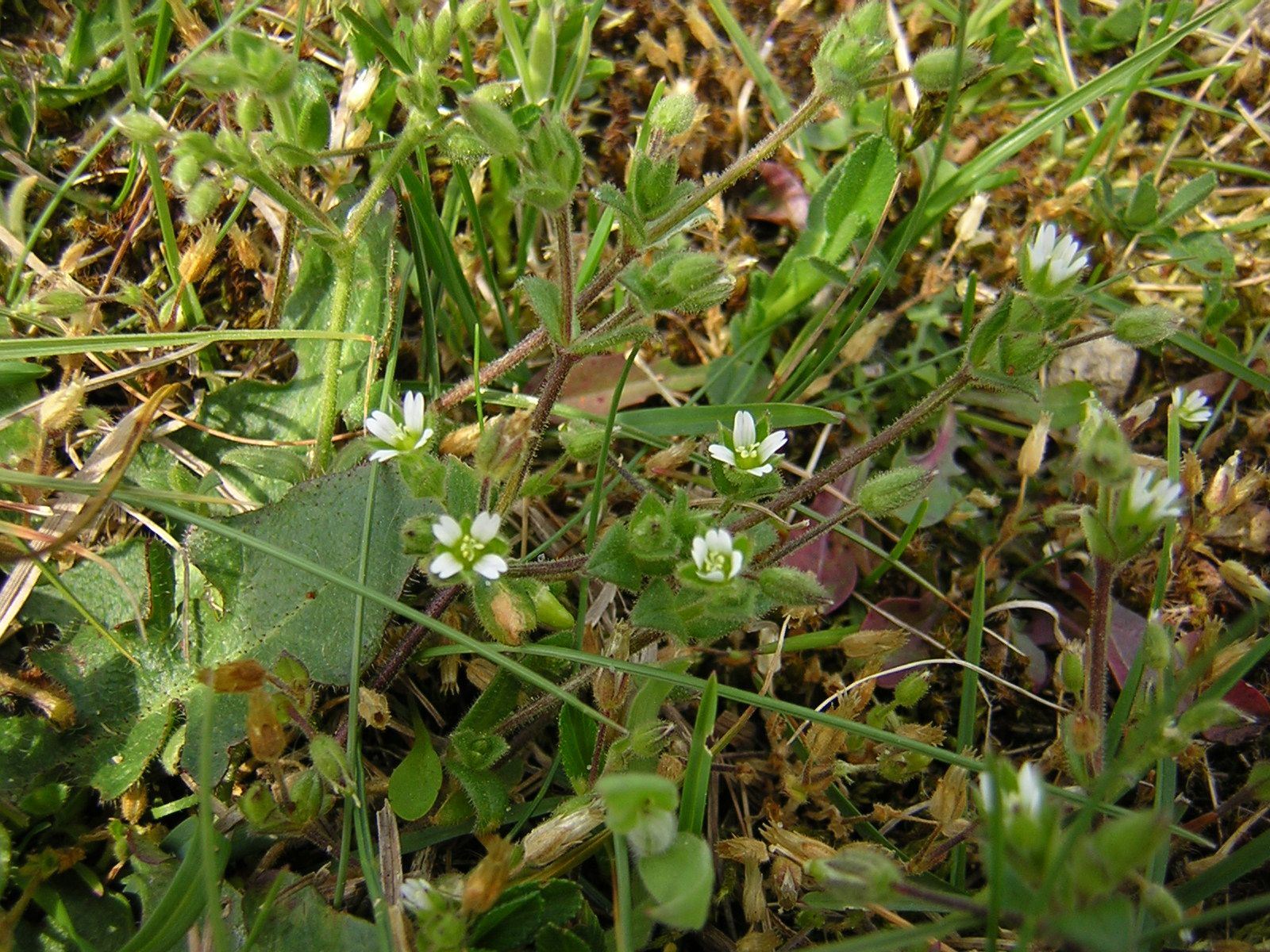

Scientific classification
- Kingdom: Plantae
- Clade: Tracheophytes
- Clade: Angiosperms
- Clade: Eudicots
- Order: Caryophyllales
- Family: Caryophyllaceae
- Genus: Cerastium
- Species: C. diffusum

Binomial name
- Cerastium diffusum Pers.

Synonyms
- Cerastium atrovirens Bab.; Cerastium tetrandrum Curtis

= Cerastium diffusum =

Species of flowering plant in the pink family

Cerastium diffusum, the fourstamen chickweed or sea mouse-ear, is a species of flowering plant in the pink and carnation family Caryophyllaceae. It is an annual herb, up to 30 cm.high, occurring in western Europe and northern Africa. It is mainly found in coastal areas of Algeria, the Baleares, Belgium, Corsica, Denmark, France, the Faroe Islands, Germany, Great Britain, Ireland, Italy, Libya, Morocco, Netherlands, Norway, Portugal, Sardinia, Sicily, Spain and Sweden. The flowers have 4 (or rarely 5) petals, 4 or 5 stamens appearing between March and May. The petals are much shorter than the sepals. The leaves are opposite, (sessile) without petioles and the sepals and bracts are all green, without pale margins. The fruit petioles are upright and diffuse at maturity.

There are two known Infraspecifics:

- Cerastium diffusum subsp. diffusum
- Cerastium diffusum subsp. gussonei (Tod. ex Lojac.) P.D.Sell & Whitehead

It was first published in Synopsis plantarum 1 on page 520 in 1805.
