= Markus von Jabornegg =

Markus von Jabornegg zu Gamsenegg und Moderndorf (17 March 1837, Klagenfurt – 6 May 1910, Klagenfurt) was an Austrian government official and botanist.

Following graduation from the Theresian Military Academy, he was sent as a Regimentskadett to Pressburg. Later, he was stationed in Galicia, Hungary, Graz, Vienna and Italy. From 1859 he was based in Carinthia, where he was eventually appointed Landeskanzleidirektor (1876).

He was a catalyst in the development of the botanical garden in Klagenfurt, serving as its director from 1871 to 1909. From 1901 to 1910, he was president of the natural history museum of Carinthia, and for a period of time served as president of the Kärntner Gartenbauvereins (Carinthian Horticultural Society). Also, he taught classes at the Gartenbauschule (school of horticulture) in Klagenfurt.

With David Pacher, he collaborated on Flora von Kärnten, a work involving Carinthian flora that was issued from 1881 to 1894. From 1875 to 1892, he was an editor of the magazine Carinthia.
