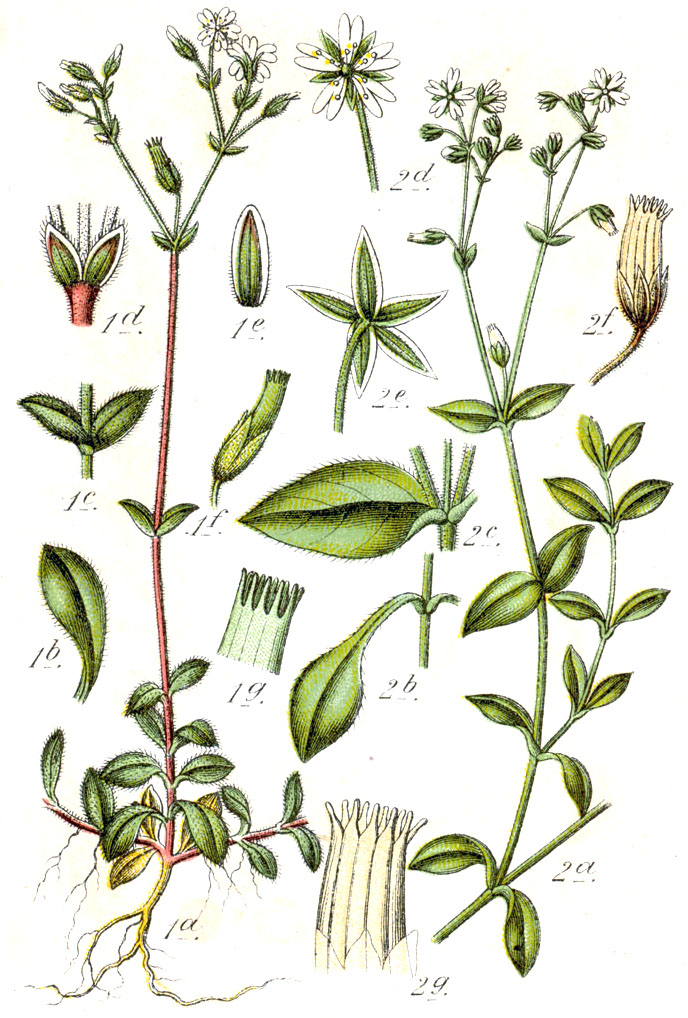

Scientific classification
- Kingdom: Plantae
- Clade: Tracheophytes
- Clade: Angiosperms
- Clade: Eudicots
- Order: Caryophyllales
- Family: Caryophyllaceae
- Genus: Cerastium
- Species: C. sylvaticum

Binomial name
- Cerastium sylvaticum Waldst. & Kit.

= Cerastium sylvaticum =

Species of flowering plant

Cerastium sylvaticum is a species of flowering plant belonging to the family Caryophyllaceae.

Its native range is Europe to Turkey.
