= Qarabiy yayla =

Mountain range and nature reserve in Crimea

Qarabiy yayla botanical nature reserve
- IUCN category IV (habitat/species management area)
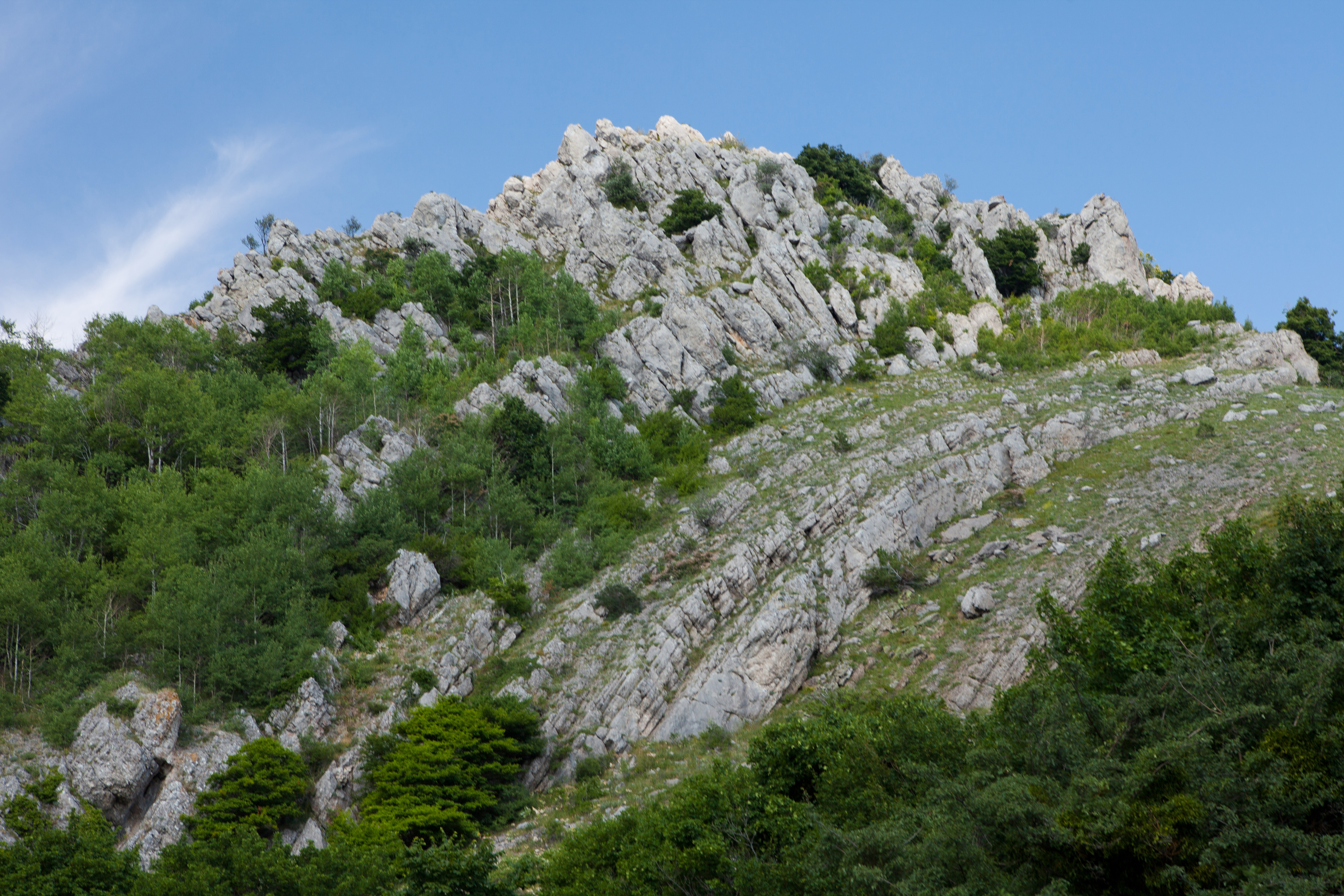

- Location within Crimea Location within Ukraine
- Location: Crimea
- Nearest city: Alushta, Bilohirsk
- Coordinates: 44°53′44″N 34°29′45″E
- Area: 49 ha (0.49 km^{2})
- Elevation: 1,262 m (4,140 ft)
- Established: 3 August 1978

The Qarabiy yayla (Crimean Tatar: Къарабий яйла, lit. 'Black Spider Pasture') is a mountain range and botanical zakaznik (nature reserve) located in Crimea, a region internationally recognised as part of Ukraine but occupied by Russia since 2014. The highest range of the Crimean Mountains, Qarabiy yayla is best known for its picturesque views and large number of caves.

== Description ==
Qarabiy yayla is a limestone mountain range located in the Central Range of the Crimean Mountains. It is the largest range of the Crimean Mountains, with its highest mountain, Tay Qoba, stretching to a height of 1,262 m (4,140 ft). Separating Qarabiy yayla from other ranges are four rivers; to the west is the Burulça and its tributary, the Suat, separating Qarabiy yayla from Orta Sırt yayla. To the east are the Büyük Qarasuv and Tana Suv rivers.

Qarabiy yayla is best known for its caves. The mountain range has over 3,500 caves, including Soldier cave (Crimea's deepest cave), Manastır Çoqraq, and Buzluq qobası. Another popular attraction in Qarabiy yayla is Tay Qoba, and from there to the nearby Qaratav. Qarabiy yayla is home to several protected areas, including the range itself, which is home to a botanical nature reserve for medicinal plants. Other protected areas include the Crimean Mountain karst, Soldier cave, the Qarasuv Başı spring, Qaratav (in particular, a beech forest at the mountain's plateau), and the Qarabiy yayla basin.

== History ==
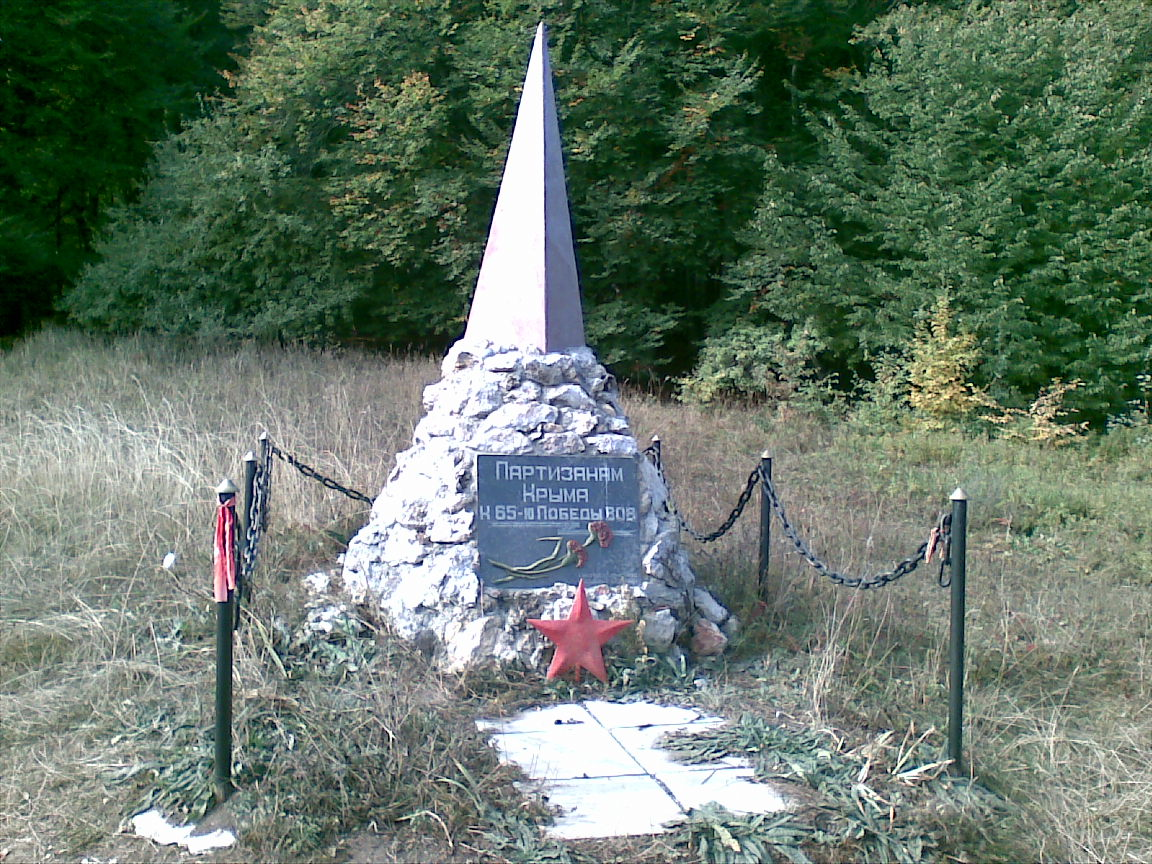
A monument to the Crimean partisans in Qarabiy yayla

Archaeological findings corresponding to the prehistorical Kizil-Koba culture have been found on Qarabiy yayla, dating back to the 7th or 8th century BCE. These findings last up until the 2nd century BCE.

During World War II, Crimea was fully captured by Nazi German forces by 1942. In order to receive supplies from the Red Army, an impromptu airfield was established on Qarabiy yayla. From 28 September 1942 until the Crimean peninsula was fully recaptured by the Soviets on 12 May 1944, over 240 tonnes of cargo were delivered to the Crimean Soviet partisans, and 450 people were evacuated from Crimea to areas under Soviet control.
