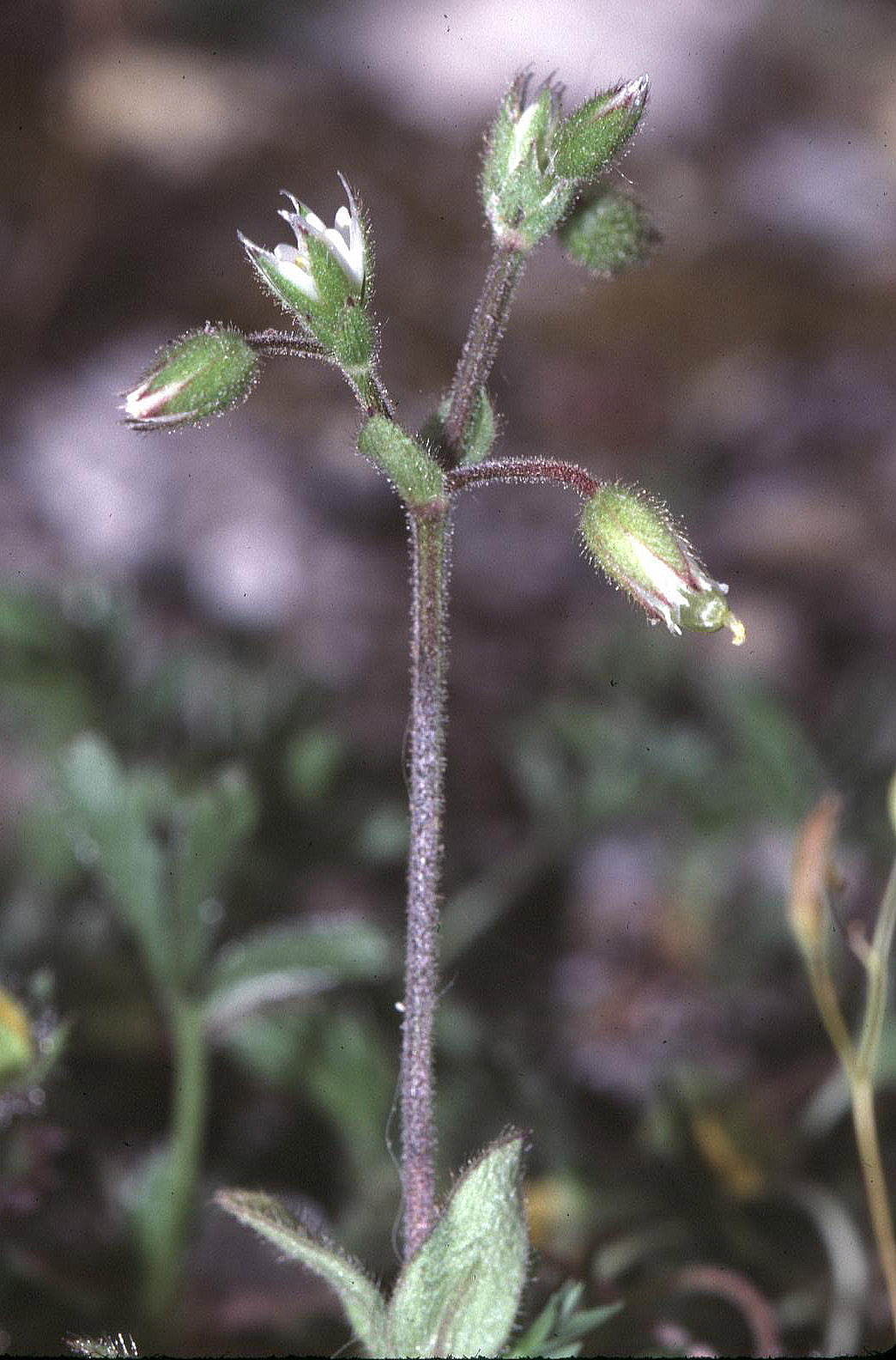

Scientific classification
- Kingdom: Plantae
- Clade: Tracheophytes
- Clade: Angiosperms
- Clade: Eudicots
- Order: Caryophyllales
- Family: Caryophyllaceae
- Genus: Cerastium
- Species: C. pumilum

Binomial name
- Cerastium pumilum Curtis

= Cerastium pumilum =

Species of flowering plant in the pink family

Cerastium pumilum, the dwarf mouse-ear or European chickweed, is an annual or biannual herbaceous plant, between 2 and 20 cm (0.8 and 7.9 in) high, native to Central and western Europe. The petals of the white flowers are shorter or equally long as the sepals, and split in the middle, up to a quarter of the length. The fruit petioles stand diagonal to the stems, often bent over at their top. Flowering occurs between March and May. Rarely occurs on the seacoast.
