= David Pacher =

David Pacher (5 September 1816, Obervellach – 29 May 1902, Obervellach) was an Austrian priest and botanist.

He studied theology at the seminary in Klagenfurt, receiving his ordination in July 1840. Afterwards, he served as a clergyman in several locations throughout Carinthia. Beginning in 1862, he became a pastor in the village of Tiffen, and in 1872 was appointed dechant (dean) and first episcopal consistory in Obervellach.

With Markus von Jabornegg (1837-1910), he was the author of Flora von Kärnten, a work on Carinthian flora issued in three parts (1881-1894). Plants with the specific epithet of pacheri are named in his honor.
