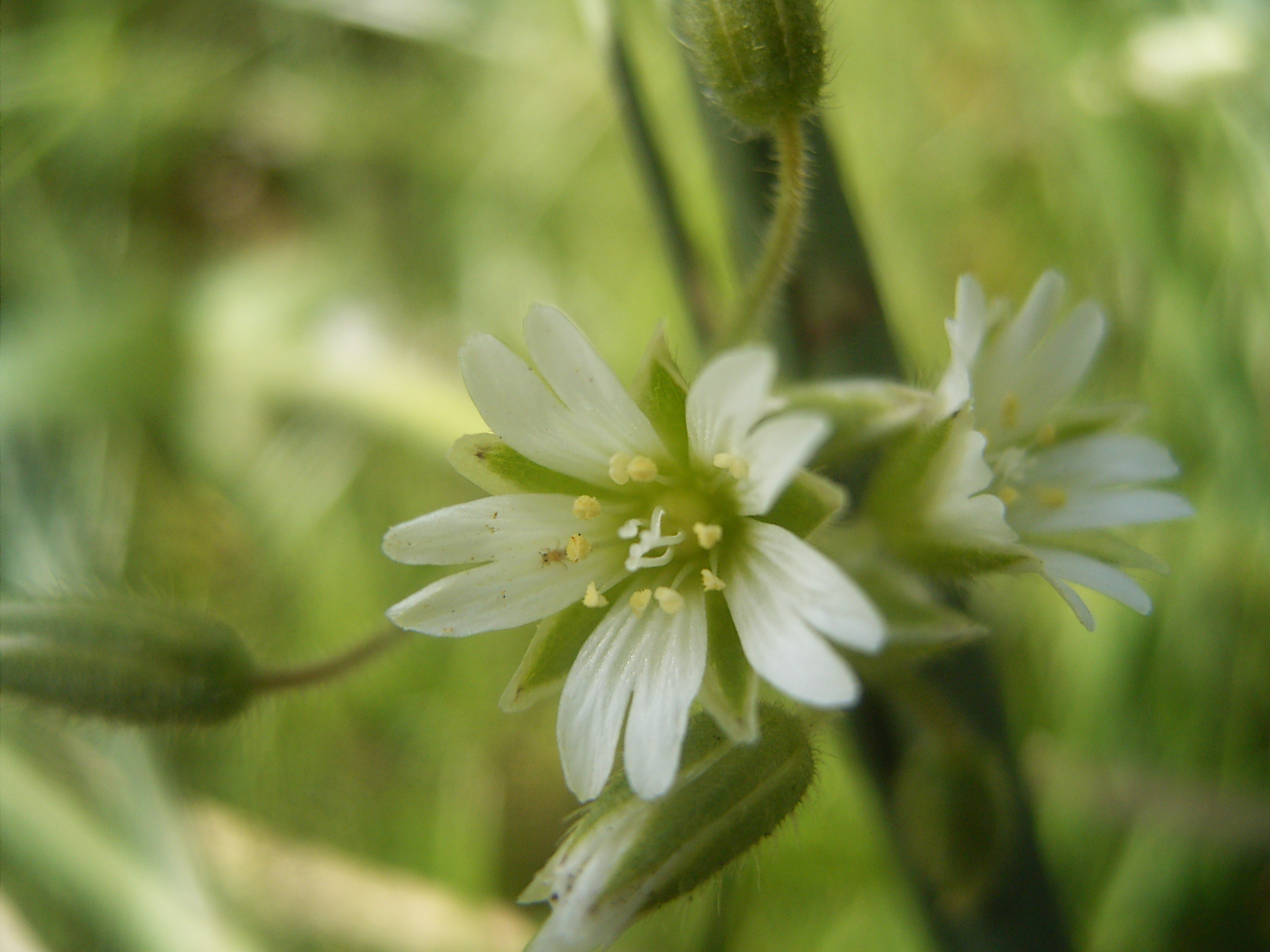

Scientific classification
- Kingdom: Plantae
- Clade: Tracheophytes
- Clade: Angiosperms
- Clade: Eudicots
- Order: Caryophyllales
- Family: Caryophyllaceae
- Genus: Cerastium
- Species: C. fontanum

Binomial name
- Cerastium fontanum Baumg.

= Cerastium fontanum =

Mouse-ear chickweed

Species of flowering plant

Cerastium fontanum, also called mouse-ear chickweed, common mouse-ear, or starweed, is a species of mat-forming perennial or, rarely, annual plant. It is native to Europe but introduced elsewhere. Its identifying characteristics are tear-shaped leaves growing opposite one another in a star pattern, hairy leaves, and small white flowers. Mouse-ear chickweed typically grows to 4"-8" tall and spreads horizontally along the ground via the formation of roots wherever the stem falls over and contacts the ground.

== Description ==
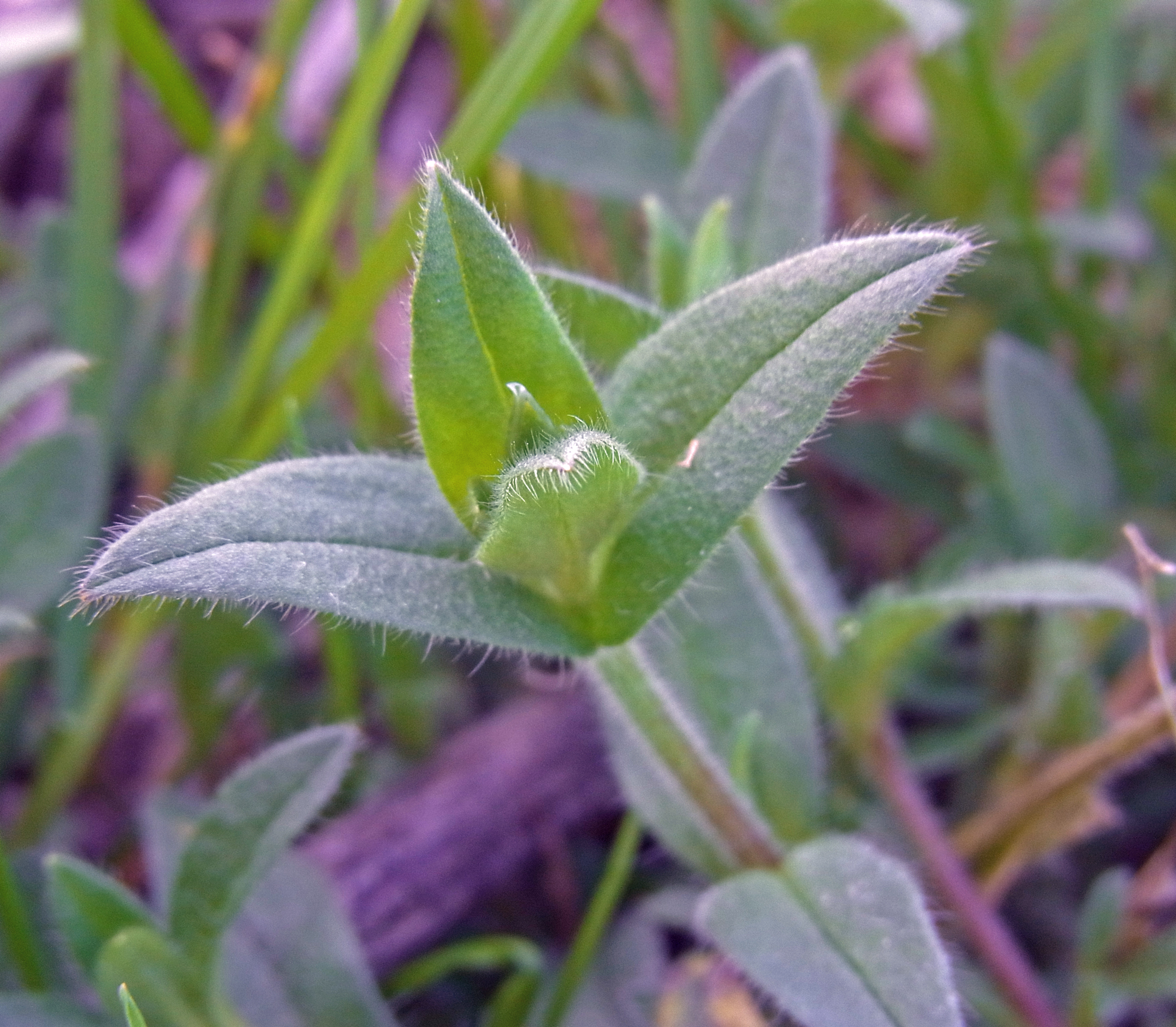

Cerastium fontanum is a low growing plant covered with small hairs which are not sticky, that is, without glandular tips. The erect flowering stems up to 45 cm (18 in) long and leaves, opposite, up to 20 mm (0.79 in) long without stalks. It has prostrate branches which do not bear flowers. The 5 petals are shorter than the sepals or a little longer and are deeply divided. The flowers have 10 stamens with 5 separate styles.

== Habitat ==
It is common in grassland and along roadsides.

== Distribution ==
It is native to Europe, Greenland, the Himalayas and Japan. It is common throughout Great Britain and Ireland. It has been introduced to the Falkland Islands and MacQuarie Island, and to many other places around the world, including all 50 of the United States and all provinces and territories of Canada except Nunavut.

== Etymology ==
Cerastium is derived from the Greek word for 'horned', in reference to the shape of its fruit capsule.

Fontanum means 'of fountains', 'of springs', or 'of fast-running streams'. It is a cognate with 'fountain' and 'font'.
