= List of plant communities in the British National Vegetation Classification =

The following is the list of the 286 plant communities which comprise the British National Vegetation Classification (NVC). These are grouped by major habitat category, as used in the five volumes of British Plant Communities, the standard work describing the NVC.

== Woodland and scrub communities ==
The following 25 communities are described in Volume 1 of British Plant Communities. For an article summarising these communities see Woodland and scrub communities in the British National Vegetation Classification system.

- W1 Salix cinerea - Galium palustre woodland
- W2 Salix cinerea - Betula pubescens - Phragmites australis woodland
- W3 Salix pentandra - Carex rostrata woodland
- W4 Betula pubescens - Molinia caerulea woodland
- W5 Alnus glutinosa - Carex paniculata woodland
- W6 Alnus glutinosa - Urtica dioica woodland
- W7 Alnus glutinosa - Fraxinus excelsior - Lysimachia nemorum woodland
- W8 Fraxinus excelsior - Acer campestre - Mercurialis perennis woodland
- W9 Fraxinus excelsior - Sorbus aucuparia - Mercurialis perennis woodland
- W10 Quercus robur - Pteridium aquilinum - Rubus fruticosus woodland
- W11 Quercus petraea - Betula pubescens - Oxalis acetosella woodland
- W12 Fagus sylvatica - Mercurialis perennis woodland
- W13 Taxus baccata woodland
- W14 Fagus sylvatica - Rubus fruticosus woodland
- W15 Fagus sylvatica - Deschampsia flexuosa woodland
- W16 Quercus spp. - Betula spp. - Deschampsia flexuosa woodland
- W17 Quercus petraea - Betula pubescens - Dicranum majus woodland
- W18 Pinus sylvestris - Hylocomium splendens woodland
- W19 Juniperus communis ssp. communis - Oxalis acetosella woodland
- W20 Salix lapponum - Luzula sylvatica scrub
- W21 Crataegus monogyna - Hedera helix scrub
- W22 Prunus spinosa - Rubus fruticosus scrub
- W23 Ulex europaeus - Rubus fruticosus scrub
- W24 Rubus fruticosus - Holcus lanatus underscrub
- W25 Pteridium aquilinum - Rubus fruticosus underscrub

== Mires ==
The following 38 communities are described in Volume 2 of British Plant Communities. For an article summarising these communities see Mires in the British National Vegetation Classification system.

- M1 Sphagnum auriculatum bog pool community
- M2 Sphagnum cuspidatum/recurvum bog pool community
- M3 Eriophorum angustifolium bog pool community
- M4 Carex rostrata - Sphagnum recurvum mire
- M5 Carex rostrata - Sphagnum squarrosum mire
- M6 Carex echinata - Sphagnum recurva/auriculatum mire
- M7 Carex curta - Sphagnum russowii mire
- M8 Carex rostrata - Sphagnum warnstorfii mire
- M9 Carex rostrata - Calligeron cuspidatum/giganteum mire
- M10 Carex dioica - Pinguicula vulgaris mire Pinguiculo-Caricetum dioicae Jones 1973 emend.
- M11 Carex demissa - Saxifraga aizoides mire Carici-Saxifragetum aizoidis McVean & Ratcliffe 1962 emend.
- M12 Carex saxatilis mire Caricetum saxatilis McVean & Ratcliffe 1962
- M13 Schoenus nigricans - Juncus subnodulosus mire Schoenetum nigricantis Koch 1926
- M14 Schoneus nigricans - Narthecium ossifragum mire
- M15 Scirpus cespitosus - Erica tetralix wet heath
- M16 Erica tetralix - Sphagnum compactum wet heath Ericetum tetralicis Schwickerath 1933
- M17 Scirpus cespitosus - Eriophorum vaginatum blanket mire
- M18 Erica tetralix - Sphagnum papillosum raised and blanket mire
- M19 Calluna vulgaris - Eriophorum vaginatum blanket mire
- M20 Eriophorum vaginatum raised and blanket mire
- M21 Narthecium ossifragum - Sphagnum papillosum valley mire Narthecio-Sphagnetum euatlanticum Duvigneaud 1949
- M22 Juncus subnodulosus - Cirsium palustre fen-meadow
- M23 Juncus effusus/acutiflorus - Galium palustre rush-pasture
- M24 Molinia caerulea - Cirsium dissectum fen-meadow Cirsium-Molinietum caeruleae Sissingh & De Vries 1942 emend.
- M25 Molinia caerulea - Potentilla erecta mire
- M26 Molinia caerulea - Crepis paludosa mire
- M27 Filipendula ulmaria - Angelica sylvestris mire
- M28 Iris pseudacorus - Filipendula ulmaria mire Filipendulo-Iridetum pseudacori Adam 1976 emend.
- M29 Hypericum elodes - Potamogeton polygonifolius soakway Hyperico-Potametum polygonifolii (Allorge 1921) Braun-Blanquet & Tüxen 1952
- M30 Related vegetation of seasonally-inundated habitats Hydrocotyla-Baldellion Tüxen & Dierssen 1972
- M31 Anthelia judacea - Sphagnum auriculatum spring Sphagno auriculati-Anthelietum judaceae Shimwell 1972
- M32 Philonotis fontana - Saxifraga stellaris spring Philonoto-Saxifragetum stellaris Nordhagen 1943
- M33 Pohlia wahlenbergii var. glacialis spring Pohlietum glacialis McVean & Ratcliffe 1962
- M34 Carex demissa - Koenigia islandica flush
- M35 Ranunculus omiophyllus - Montia fontana rill
- M36 Lowland springs and streambanks of shaded situations Cardaminion (Maas 1959) Westhoff & den Held 1969
- M37 Cratoneuron commutatum - Festuca rubra spring
- M38 Cratoneuron commutatum - Carex nigra spring

== Heaths ==
The following 22 communities are described in Volume 2 of British Plant Communities. For an article summarising these communities see Heaths in the British National Vegetation Classification system.

- H1 Calluna vulgaris - Festuca ovina heath
- H2 Calluna vulgaris - Ulex minor heath
- H3 Ulex minor - Agrostis curtisii heath
- H4 Ulex gallii - Agrostis curtisii heath
- H5 Erica vagans - Schoenus nigricans heath
- H6 Erica vagans - Ulex europaeus heath
- H7 Calluna vulgaris - Scilla verna heath
- H8 Calluna vulgaris - Ulex gallii heath
- H9 Calluna vulgaris - Deschampsia flexuosa heath
- H10 Calluna vulgaris - Erica cinerea heath
- H11 Calluna vulgaris - Carex arenaris heath
- H12 Calluna vulgaris - Vaccinium myrtillus heath
- H13 Calluna vulgaris - Cladonia arbuscula heath
- H14 Calluna vulgaris - Racomitrium lanuginosum heath
- H15 Calluna vulgaris - Juniperus communis ssp. nana heath
- H16 Calluna vulgaris - Arctostaphylos uva-ursi heath
- H17 Calluna vulgaris - Arctostaphylos alpinus heath
- H18 Vaccinium myrtillus - Deschampsia flexuosa heath
- H19 Vaccinium myrtillus - Cladonia arbuscula heath
- H20 Vaccinium myrtillus - Racomitrium lanuginosum heath
- H21 Calluna vulgaris - Vaccinium myrtillus - Sphagnum capillifolium heath
- H22 Vaccinium myrtillus - Rubus chamaemorus heath

== Mesotrophic grasslands ==
The following 13 communities are described in Volume 3 of British Plant Communities. For an article summarising these communities see Mesotrophic grasslands in the British National Vegetation Classification system.

- MG1 Arrhenatherum elatius grassland Arrhenatheretum elatioris Br.-Bl. 1919
- MG2 Arrhenatherum elatius - Filipendula ulmaria tall-herb grassland Filipendulo-Arrhenatheretum elatioris Shimwell 1968a
- MG3 Anthoxanthum odoratum - Geranium sylvaticum grassland
- MG4 Alopecurus pratensis - Sanguisorba officinalis grassland
- MG5 Cynosurus cristatus - Centaurea nigra grassland Centaureo-Cynosuretum cristati Br.-Bl. & Tx 1952
- MG6 Lolium perenne - Cynosurus cristatus grassland Lolio-Cynosuretum cristati (Br.-Bl. & De Leeuw 1936) R. Tx 1937
- MG7 Lolium perenne leys and related grasslands Lolio-Plantaginion Sissingh 1969 p.p.
- MG8 Cynosurus cristatus - Caltha palustris grassland
- MG9 Holcus lanatus - Deschampsia cespitosa grassland
- MG10 Holcus lanatus - Juncus effusus rush-pasture Holco-Juncetum effusi Page 1980
- MG11 Festuca rubra - Agrostis stolonifera - Potentilla anserina grassland
- MG12 Festuca arundinacea grassland Potentillo-Festucetum arundinaceae Nordhagen 1940
- MG13 Agrostis stolonifera - Alopecurus geniculatus grassland
- MG14 Carex nigra - Agrostis stolonifera - Senecio aquaticus grassland
- MG15 Alopecurus pratensis - Poa trivialis - Cardamine pratensis grassland
- MG16 Agrostis stolonifera - Eleocharis palustris grassland

== Calcicolous grasslands ==
The following 14 communities are described in Volume 3 of British Plant Communities. For an article summarising these communities see Calcicolous grasslands in the British National Vegetation Classification system.

- CG1 Festuca ovina - Carlina vulgaris grassland
- CG2 Festuca ovina - Avenula pratensis grassland
- CG3 Bromus erectus grassland
- CG4 Brachypodium pinnatum grassland
- CG5 Bromus erectus - Brachypodium pinnatum grassland
- CG6 Avenula pubescens grassland
- CG7 Festuca ovina - Hieracium pilosella - Thymus praecox/pulegioides grassland
- CG8 Sesleria albicans - Scabiosa columbaria grassland
- CG9 Sesleria albicans - Galium sterneri grassland
- CG10 Festuca ovina - Agrostis capillaris - Thymus praecox grassland
- CG11 Festuca ovina - Agrostis capillaris - Alchemilla alpina grass-heath
- CG12 Festuca ovina - Alchemilla alpina - Silene acaulis dwarf-herb community
- CG13 Dryas octopetala - Carex flacca heath
- CG14 Dryas octopetala - Silene acaulis ledge community

== Calcifugous grasslands and montane communities ==
The following 21 communities are described in Volume 3 of British Plant Communities. For an article summarising these communities see Calcifugous grasslands and montane communities in the British National Vegetation Classification system.

- U1 Festuca ovina - Agrostris capillaris - Rumex acetosella grassland
- U2 Deschampsia flexuosa grassland
- U3 Agrostis curtisii grassland
- U4 Festuca ovina - Agrostris capillaris - Galium saxatile grassland
- U5 Nardus stricta - Galium saxatile grassland
- U6 Juncus squarrosus - Festuca ovina grassland
- U7 Nardus stricta - Carex bigelowii grass-heath
- U8 Carex bigelowii - Polytrichum alpinum sedge-heath
- U9 Juncus trifidus - Racomitrium lanuginosum rush-heath
- U10 Carex bigelowii - Racomitrium lanuginosum moss-heath
- U11 Polytrichum sexangulare - Kiaeria starkei snow-bed
- U12 Salix herbacea - Racomitrium heterostichum snow-bed
- U13 Deschampsia cespitosa - Galium saxatile grassland
- U14 Alchemilla alpina - Sibbaldia procumbens dwarf-herb community
- U15 Saxifraga aizoides - Alchemilla glabra banks
- U16 Luzula sylvatica - Vaccinium myrtillus tall-herb community
- U17 Luzula sylvatica - Geum rivale tall-herb community
- U18 Cryptogramma crispa - Athyrium distentifolium snow-bed
- U19 Thelypteris limbosperma - Blechnum spicant community
- U20 Pteridium aquilinum - Galium saxatile community
- U21 Cryptogramma crispa - Deschampsia flexuosa community

== Aquatic communities ==
The following 24 communities are described in Volume 4 of British Plant Communities. For an article summarising these communities see Aquatic communities in the British National Vegetation Classification system.

- A1 Lemna gibba community Lemnetum gibbae Miyawaki & J. Tx. 1960
- A2 Lemna minor community Lemnetum minoris Soó 1947
- A3 Spirodela polyrhiza - Hydrocharis morsus-ranae community
- A4 Hydrocharis morsus-ranae - Stratiotes aloides community
- A5 Ceratophyllum demersum community Certaophylletum demersi Hild 1956
- A6 Ceratophyllum submersum community Certaophylletum submersi Den Hartog & Segal 1964
- A7 Nymphaea alba community Nymphaeetum albae Oberdorfer & Mitarb. 1967
- A8 Nuphar lutea community
- A9 Potamogeton natans community
- A10 Polygonum amphibium community
- A11 Potamogeton pectinatus - Myriophyllum spicatum community
- A12 Potamogeton pectinatus community
- A13 Potamogeton perfoliatus - Myriophyllum alterniflorum community
- A14 Myriophyllum alterniflorum community Myriophylletum alterniflori
- A15 Elodea canadensis community
- A16 Callitriche stagnalis community
- A17 Ranunculus penicillatus ssp. pseudofluitans community
- A18 Ranunculus fluitans community Ranunculetum fluitantis Allorge 1922
- A19 Ranunculus aquatilis community Ranunculetum aquatilis Géhu 1961
- A20 Ranunculus peltatus community Ranunculetum peltati Sauer 1947
- A21 Ranunculus baudotii community Ranunculetum baudotii Br.-Bl. 1952
- A22 Littorella uniflora - Lobelia dortmanna community
- A23 Isoetes lacustris/setacea community
- A24 Juncus bulbosus community

== Swamps and tall-herb fens ==
The following 28 communities are described in Volume 4 of British Plant Communities. For an article summarising these communities see Swamps and tall-herb fens in the British National Vegetation Classification system.

- S1 Carex elata sedge-swamp Caricetum elatae Koch 1926
- S2 Cladium mariscus swamp and sedge-beds Cladietum marisci Zobrist 1933 emend. Pfeiffer 1961
- S3 Carex paniculata swamp Caricetum paniculatae Wangerin 1916
- S4 Phragmites australis swamp and reed-beds Phragmitetum australis (Gams 1927) Schmale 1939
- S5 Glyceria maxima swamp Glycerietum maximae (Nowinski 1928) Hueck 1931 emend. Krausch 1965
- S6 Carex riparia swamp Caricetum ripariae Soó 1928
- S7 Carex acutiformis swamp Caricetum acutiformis Sauer 1937
- S8 Scirpus lacustris ssp. lacustris swamp Scirpetum lacustris (Allorge 1922) Chouard 1924
- S9 Carex rostrata swamp Caricetum rostratae Rübel 1912
- S10 Equisetum fluviatile swamp Equisetetum fluviatile Steffen 1931 emend. Wilczek 1935
- S11 Carex vesicaria swamp Caricetum vesicariae Br.-Bl. & Denis 1926
- S12 Typha latifolia swamp Typhetum latifoliae Soó 1927
- S13 Typha angustifolia swamp Typhetum angustifoliae Soó 1927
- S14 Sparganium erectum swamp Sparganietum erecti Roll 1938
- S15 Acorus calamus swamp Acoretum calami Schulz 1941
- S16 Sagittaria sagittifolia swamp
- S17 Carex pseudocyperus swamp
- S18 Carex otrubae swamp Caricetum otrubae Mirza 1978
- S19 Eleocharis palustris swamp Eleocharitetum palustris Schennikow 1919
- S20 Scirpus lacustris ssp. tabernaemontani swamp Scirpetum tabernaemontani Passarge 1964
- S21 Scirpus maritimus swamp Scirpetum maritimi (Br.-Bl. 1931) R.Tx. 1937
- S22 Glyceria fluitans water-margin vegetation Glycerietum fluitantis Wilczek 1935
- S23 Other water-margin vegetation Glycerio-Sparganion Br.-Bl. & Sissingh apud Boer 1942 emend. Segal
- S24 Phragmites australis - Peucedanum palustre tall-herb fen Peucedano-Phragmitetum australis Wheeler 1978 emend.
- S25 Phragmites australis - Eupatorium cannabinum tall-herb fen
- S26 Phragmites australis - Urtica dioica tall-herb fen
- S27 Carex rostrata - Potentilla palustris tall-herb fen Potentillo-Caricetum rostratae Wheeler 1980a
- S28 Phalaris arundinacea tall-herb fen Phalaridetum arundinaceae Libbert 1931

== Salt-marsh communities ==
The following 28 communities are described in Volume 5 of British Plant Communities. For an article summarising these communities see Salt-marsh communities in the British National Vegetation Classification system.

- SM1 Zostera communities Zosterion Christiansen 1934
- SM2 Ruppia maritima salt-marsh community Ruppietum maritimae Hocquette 1927
- SM3 Eleocharis parvula salt-marsh community Eleocharitetum parvulae (Preuss 1911/12) Gillner 1960
- SM4 Spartina maritima salt-marsh community Spartinetum maritimae (Emb. & Regn. 1926) Corillion 1953
- SM5 Spartina alterniflora salt-marsh community Spartinetum alterniflorae Corillion 1953
- SM6 Spartina anglica salt-marsh community Spartinetum townsendii (Tansley 1939) Corillion 1953
- SM7 Arthrocnemum perenne stands
- SM8 Annual Salicornia salt-marsh community Salicornietum europaeae Warming 1906
- SM9 Suaeda maritima salt-marsh community Suaedetum maritimae (Conrad 1935) Pignatti 1953
- SM10 Transitional low-marsh vegetation with Puccinellia maritima, annual Salicornia species and Suaeda maritima
- SM11 Aster tripolium var. discoideus salt-marsh community Asteretum tripolii Tansley 1939
- SM12 Rayed Aster tripolium on salt-marshes
- SM13 Puccinellia maritima salt-marsh community Puccinellietum maritimae (Warming 1906) Christiansen 1927
- SM14 Halimione portaculoides salt-marsh community Halimionetum portulacoidis (Kuhnholtz-Lordat 1927) Des Abbayes & Corillion 1949
- SM15 Juncus maritimus - Triglochin maritima salt-marsh community
- SM16 Festuca rubra salt-marsh community Juncetum gerardi Warming 1906
- SM17 Artemisia maritima salt-marsh community Artemisietum maritimae Hocquette 1927
- SM18 Juncus maritimus salt-marsh community
- SM19 Blysmus rufus salt-marsh community Blysmetum rufi (G.E. & G. Du Rietz 1925) Gillner 1960
- SM20 Eleocharis uniglumis salt-marsh community Eleocharitetum uniglumis Nordhagen 1923
- SM21 Suaeda vera - Limonium binervosum salt-marsh community
- SM22 Halimione portulacoides - Frankenia laevis salt-marsh community Limonio vulgaris - Frankenietum laevis Géhu & Géhu-Franck 1975
- SM23 Spergularia marina - Puccinellia distans salt-marsh community Puccinellietum distantis Feekes (1934) 1945
- SM24 Elymus pycnanthus salt-marsh community Atriplici-Elymetum pycnanthi Beeftink & Westhoff 1962
- SM25 Suaeda vera drift-line community Elymo pycnanthi - Suaedetum verae (Arènes 1933) Géhu 1975
- SM26 Inula crithmoides on salt-marshes
- SM27 Ephermeral salt-marsh vegetation with Sagina maritima Saginion maritimae Westhoff, van Leeuwen & Adriani 1962
- SM28 Elymus repens salt-marsh community Elymetum repentis maritimum Nordhagen 1940

== Shingle, strandline and sand-dune communities ==
The following 19 communities are described in Volume 5 of British Plant Communities. For an article summarising these communities see Shingle, strandline and sand-dune communities in the British National Vegetation Classification system.

- SD1 Rumex crispus - Glaucium flavum shingle community
- SD2 Honkenya peploides - Cakile maritima strandline community
- SD3 Matricaria maritima - Galium aparine strandline community
- SD4 Elymus farctus ssp. boreali-atlanticus foredune community
- SD5 Leymus arenarius mobile dune community
- SD6 Ammophila arenaria mobile dune community
- SD7 Ammophila arenaria - Festuca rubra semi-fixed dune community
- SD8 Festuca rubra - Galium verum fixed dune grassland
- SD9 Ammophila arenaria - Arrhenatherum elatius dune grassland
- SD10 Carex arenaria dune community
- SD11 Carex arenaria - Cornicularia aculeata dune community
- SD12 Carex arenaria - Festuca ovina - Agrostis capillaris dune grassland
- SD13 Sagina nodosa - Bryum pseudotriquetrum dune-slack community
- SD14 Salix repens - Campylium stellatum dune-slack community
- SD15 Salix repens - Calliergon cuspidatum dune-slack community
- SD16 Salix repens - Holcus lanatus dune-slack community
- SD17 Potentilla anserina - Carex nigra dune-slack community
- SD18 Hippophae rhamnoides dune scrub
- SD19 Phleum arenarium - Arenaria serpyllifolia dune annual community Tortulo-Phleetum arenariae (Massart 1908) Br.-Bl. & de Leeuw 1936

== Maritime cliff communities ==
The following 12 communities are described in Volume 5 of British Plant Communities. For an article summarising these communities see Maritime cliff communities in the British National Vegetation Classification system.

- MC1 Crithmum maritimum - Spergularia rupicola maritime rock-crevice community Crithmo-Spergularietum rupicolae Géhu 1964
- MC2 Armeria maritima - Ligusticum scoticum maritime rock-crevice community
- MC3 Rhodiola rosea - Armeria maritima maritime cliff-ledge community
- MC4 Brassica oleracea maritime cliff-ledge community
- MC5 Armeria maritima - Cerastium diffusum ssp. diffusum maritime therophyte community
- MC6 Atriplex prostrata - Beta vulgaris ssp. maritima sea-bird cliff community Atriplici-Betetum maritimae J.-M. & J. Géhu 1969
- MC7 Stellaria media - Rumex acetosa sea-bird cliff community
- MC8 Festuca rubra - Armeria maritima maritime grassland
- MC9 Festuca rubra - Holcus lanatus maritime grassland
- MC10 Festuca rubra - Plantago spp. maritime grassland
- MC11 Festuca rubra - Daucus carota ssp. gummifer maritime grassland
- MC12 Festuca rubra - Hyacinthoides non-scripta maritime bluebell community

== Vegetation of open habitats ==
The following 42 communities are described in Volume 5 of British Plant Communities. For an article summarising these communities see Vegetation of open habitats in the British National Vegetation Classification system.

- OV1 Viola arvensis - Aphanes microcarpa community
- OV2 Briza minor - Silene gallica community
- OV3 Papaver rhoeas - Viola arvensis community Papaveretum argemones (Libbert 1933) Kruseman & Vlieger 1939
- OV4 Chrysanthemum segetum - Spergula arvensis community Spergulo-Chrysanthemetum segetum (Br.-Bl. & De Leeuw 1936) R. Tx. 1937
- OV5 Digitaria ischaemum - Erodium cicutarium community
- OV6 Cerastium glomeratum - Fumaria borealis ssp. boraei community
- OV7 Veronica persica - Veronica polita community Veronico - Lamietum hybridi Kruseman & Vlieger 1939
- OV8 Veronica persica - Alopecurus myosuroides community Alopecuro-Chamomilletum recutitae Wasscher 1941
- OV9 Matricaria perforata - Stellaria media community
- OV10 Poa annua - Senecio vulgaris community
- OV11 Poa annua - Stachys arvensis community
- OV12 Poa annua - Myosotis arvensis community
- OV13 Stellaria media - Capsella bursa-pastoris community
- OV14 Urtica urens - Lamium amplexicaule community
- OV15 Anagallis arvensis - Veronica persica community Kickxietum spuriae Kruseman & Vlieger 1939
- OV16 Papaver rhoeas - Silene noctiflora community Papaveri-Sileneetum noctiflori Wasscher 1941
- OV17 Reseda lutea - Polygonum aviculare community Descurainio-Anchusetum arvensis Silverside 1977
- OV18 Polygonum aviculare - Chamomilla suavolens community
- OV19 Poa annua - Matricaria perforata community
- OV20 Poa annua - Sagina procumbens community Sagino - Bryetum argentii Diemont, Sissingh & Westhoff 1940
- OV21 Poa annua - Plantago major community
- OV22 Poa annua - Taraxacum officinale community
- OV23 Lolium perenne - Dactylis glomerata community
- OV24 Urtica dioica - Galium aparine community
- OV25 Urtica dioica - Cirsium arvense community
- OV26 Epilobium hirsutum community
- OV27 Epilobium angustifolium community
- OV28 Agrostis stolonifera - Ranunculus repens community Agrostio - Ranunculetum repentis Oberdorfer et al. 1967
- OV29 Alopecurus geniculatus - Rorippa palustris community Ranunculo - Alopecuretum geniculati R. Tx. (1937) 1950
- OV30 Bidens tripartita - Polygonum amphibium community Polygono - Bidentetum tripartitae Lohmeyer in R. Tx. 1950
- OV31 Rorippa palustris - Filaginella uliginosa community
- OV32 Myosotis scorpioides - Ranunculus sceleratus community Ranunculetum scelerati R. Tx. 1950 ex Passarge 1959
- OV33 Polygonum lapathifolium - Poa annua community
- OV34 Allium schoenoprasum - Plantago maritima community
- OV35 Lythrum portula - Ranunculus flammula community
- OV36 Lythrum hyssopifolia - Juncus bufonius community
- OV37 Festuca ovina - Minuartia verna community Minuartio-Thlaspietum alpestris Koch 1932
- OV38 Gymnocarpium robertianum - Arrhenatherum elatius community Gymnocarpietum robertianae (Kuhn 1937) R. Tx. 1937
- OV39 Asplenium trichomanes - Asplenium ruta-muraria community Asplenietum trichomano-rutae-murariae R. Tx. 1937
- OV40 Asplenium viride - Cystopteris fragilis community Asplenio viridis-Cystopteridetum fragilis (Kuhn 1939) Oberdorfer 1977
- OV41 Parietaria diffusa community Parietarietum judaicae (Arènes 1928) Oberdorfer 1977
- OV42 Cymbalaria muralis community Cymbalarietum muralis Görs 1966
