= British NVC community OV17 =

Open habitat community

British NVC community OV17 (Reseda lutea - Polygonum aviculare community) is one of the open habitat communities in the British National Vegetation Classification system. Although classed with communities OV15 and OV16 as an arable weed community of light lime-rich soils, it also shares many features with the communities classed as arable weed and wasteland communities of fertile loams and clays.

This community is not found elsewhere in Europe, and in Britain is found only in East Anglia. It was first described by Silverside (1977), who labelled it the Descurainio-Anchusetum arvensis association.

There are no subcommunities.

== Community composition ==
The following constant species are found in this community:

- Bugloss (Anchusa arvensis)
- Black-bindweed (Fallopia convolvulus)
- Fat-hen (Chenopodium album)
- Flixweed (Descurainia sophia)
- Common couch (Elymus repens)
- Knotgrass (Polygonum aviculare)
- Wild mignonette (Reseda lutea)

There are no rare species associated with the community.

== Distribution ==
This community is found only in East Anglia, where it is an ephemeral community among arable crops on dry, sandy soils. It is characterised by the presence of D. sophia, A. arvensis and R. lutea.
