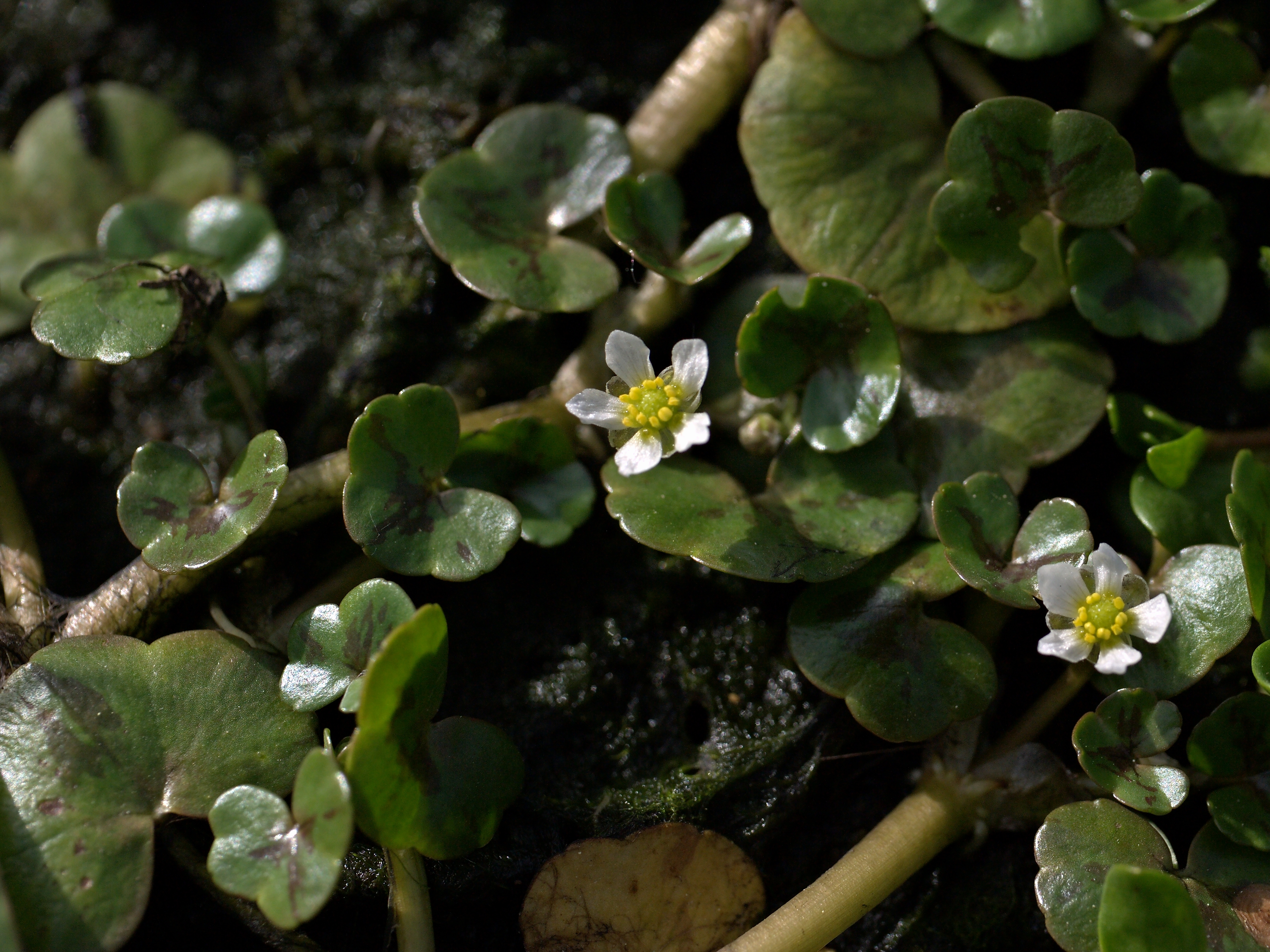

Conservation status
- Least Concern (IUCN 3.1)

Scientific classification
- Kingdom: Plantae
- Clade: Tracheophytes
- Clade: Angiosperms
- Clade: Eudicots
- Order: Ranunculales
- Family: Ranunculaceae
- Genus: Ranunculus
- Species: R. hederaceus

Binomial name
- Ranunculus hederaceus L.

= Ranunculus hederaceus =

Species of flowering plant

Ranunculus hederaceus is a flowering plant in the family Ranunculaceae.

== Description ==
Ivy-leaved crowfoot is a small, creeping, annual or perennial plant with stems up to about 50 cm (20 in) long and only laminar leaves (i.e. no submerged capillary leaves), which can be opposite or alternately arranged along the stem. The leaves are dark blueish-green on the upper surface and paler below, 2.5–3.5 cm (1.0–1.4 in) across, with 3–5 shallow lobes that are broadest at the base. The flowers are solitary on 1–2 cm (0.4–0.8 in) long pedicels which arise opposite a leaf. They have 5 narrow petals about 3 mm long, which are white with a yellow base and a crescent-shaped (lunate) nectar pit. The petals do not touch or overlap. There are also 5 green sepals, which are almost as long as the petals. The flowers are bisexual with 9–43 carpels, arranged on the hairy receptacle, and numerous bright yellow stamens. Flowering occurs from March to August in northern Europe. The fruits are hairless, about 2 mm long, and sometimes have a narrow wing.

== Identification ==
It is distinguished from other water crowfoots by a lack of submerged capillary leaves, all leaves being shiny, ivy shaped with 3–5 shallow lobes, broadest at the base and sometimes darker in the centre. Ivy-leaved crowfoot grows in mineral waters whereas the similar-looking round-leaved crowfoot is "invariably" found in more peaty waters.

== Taxonomy ==
The name Ranunculus hederaceus was published by Linnaeus in Species Plantarum in 1753. A few synonyms have been coined over the years, but none of them has been widely used.

The generic name Ranunculus is Late Latin for "little frog", the diminutive of rana. The specific epithet hederaceus simply means "like ivy", from the shape of the leaves. Common names include the Welsh Crafanc-y-Frân Dail Eiddew, which translates to "ivy-leaved claw" and the Swedish for "ivy flower", Murgönsmöja.

== Habitat and ecology ==
Ivy-leaved crowfoot is commonly associated with bare muddy ground close to water, carpeting shallow water and drainage ditches. It often grows on the cattle-poached edges of ponds, ditches and streams, in wet gateways and on paths and tracks and sometimes disappears for a year or two in dry times.

The species appears to be characteristic of contact zones between more elevated oligotrophic sandy soils and eutrophic (or polluted) small streams or small artificial running waters, or of stagnant waters strongly influenced by seepage phenomena.

Its Ellenberg values in Britain are L = 7, F = 9, R = 5, N = 5, and S = 0, which show that it favours wet, sunny places with neutral to slightly acid soil and low fertility, avoiding brackish situations. In the British National Vegetation Classification it is associated with two aquatic communities: A13 alternate-leaved water-milfoil vegetation, which is typical of low-nutrient waterbodies towards the north and west, and A8 yellow water-lily community, which is typical of rivers, ditches and canals in the lowlands in the south. It is, however, more common in water margin vegetation rather than open water, and it has been found in OV30 trifid bur-marigold, OV32 lesser spearwort and OV35 blinks communities, which are found on the margins of pools and lakes and in springs.

== Distribution and status ==
Common in the wetter west of England, Wales and southern Scotland, less common in the east of England and north west of Scotland. In Ireland it is common in the north and south but more scarce to the centre. The UK is thought to hold at least 20% of the global population of ivy-leaved water-crowfoot.

In Europe, its conservation status is LC (Least Concern), although the European Environment Agency considers it to be synonymous with R. hyperboreus, which has a wider distribution. In Britain it also has the status LC.

== Uses and in culture ==
Known to cause gastrointestinal distress, but also sometimes used to treat skin conditions and wounds (wildflowerweb).
