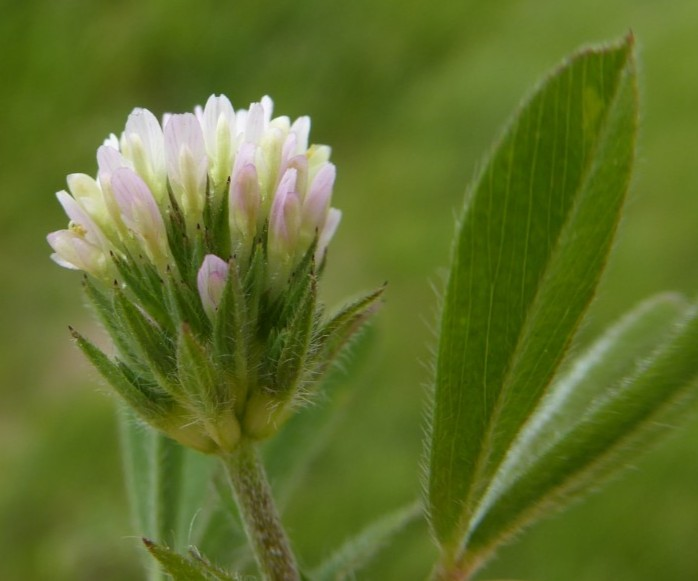

Scientific classification
- Kingdom: Plantae
- Clade: Embryophytes
- Clade: Tracheophytes
- Clade: Angiosperms
- Clade: Eudicots
- Clade: Rosids
- Order: Fabales
- Family: Fabaceae
- Subfamily: Faboideae
- Genus: Trifolium
- Species: T. squamosum

Binomial name
- Trifolium squamosum L.

Synonyms
- List: T. albidum Ten.; T. baeticum Lag.; T. cinctum DC.; T. clypeatum Lapeyr.; T. commutatum Ledeb.; T. glabellum C. Presl; T. glabrum J. Gay; T. irregulare Pourr.; T. maritimum Huds.; T. maritimum subsp. cinctum (DC.) Gibelli & Belli; T. maritimum subsp. nigrocinctum (Boiss. & Orph.) Nyman; T. maritimum subsp. xatardii (DC.) Asch. & Graebn.; T. maritimum var. irregulare (Pourr.) Asch. & Graebn.; T. maritimum var. moriferum Lojac.; T. maritimum var. nigrocinctum (Boiss. & Orph.) Boiss.; T. maritinum Huds.; T. nigrocinctum Boiss. & Orph.; T. pratense var. baeticum; T. rigidum Savi; T. squamosum subsp. xatardii (DC.) O. Bolòs & Vigo; T. squamosum var. xatartii (DC.) Guin.; T. stipulaceum Lapeyr.; T. succinctum Vis.; T. xatardii DC.; Trifolium albidum Steven

= Trifolium squamosum =

Sea clover

Flowering plant in the bean family

Trifolium squamosum, usually called sea clover in English, is an annual herb in the pea family that is found close to the Atlantic and Mediterranean shores of Europe. It grows on patches of bare ground in saltmarsh, grassland or open woodland from sea level up to about 1,000 metres (3,300 ft) towards the southern edge of its range. It is palatable to livestock but has no economic uses.

== Description ==
Sea clover is an annual herb which forms patches up to about 1 metre (3 ft) in diameter by 20–30 centimetres (8–12 in) high. It has fibrous roots and numerous ascending to erect branched stems which are hairy when young, soon becoming glabrous.

The leaves are arranged alternately along the stems (except the uppermost pair), with a prominent green stipule up to 10 mm long at the base of each petiole. The leaves, like those of other clovers, are divided into three segments but are distinctive in being narrower than in most other species, being approximately oblong in shape, ca. 20 mm x 8 mm, with a small point at the tip. The leaves have translucent veins and are covered with appressed soft, simple hairs.

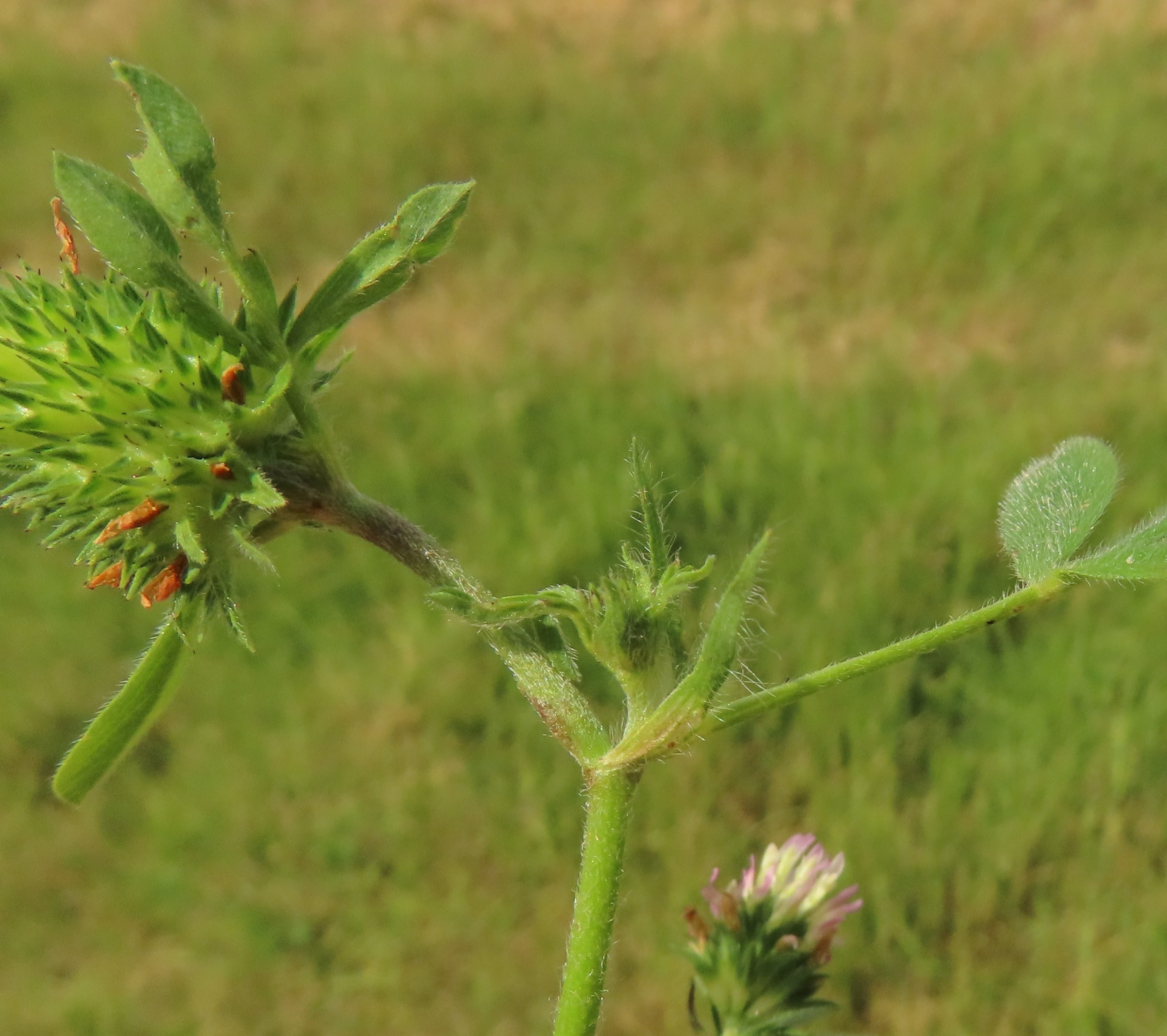
Sea clover stipules

Flowering occurs in early summer, April to July in Britain. The oval flowerheads are terminal, subtended by an opposite pair of leaves, and either stalkless or on a short peduncle up to 0.5 cm long. Each head contains 20–30 small flowers consisting of a green calyx and pink corolla. The calyx can be hairy or glabrous, with a 5 mm long whitish tube with 10 prominent veins, ending in 5 green triangular lobes, the lower one being considerably longer than the upper four. The corolla is about 7 mm long, made up of 5 petals in the characteristic pea-flower shape with a hooded standard, two wings and the two lower petals fused to form the keel. There are 10 stamens bearing yellow anthers and one style with a brown stigma.

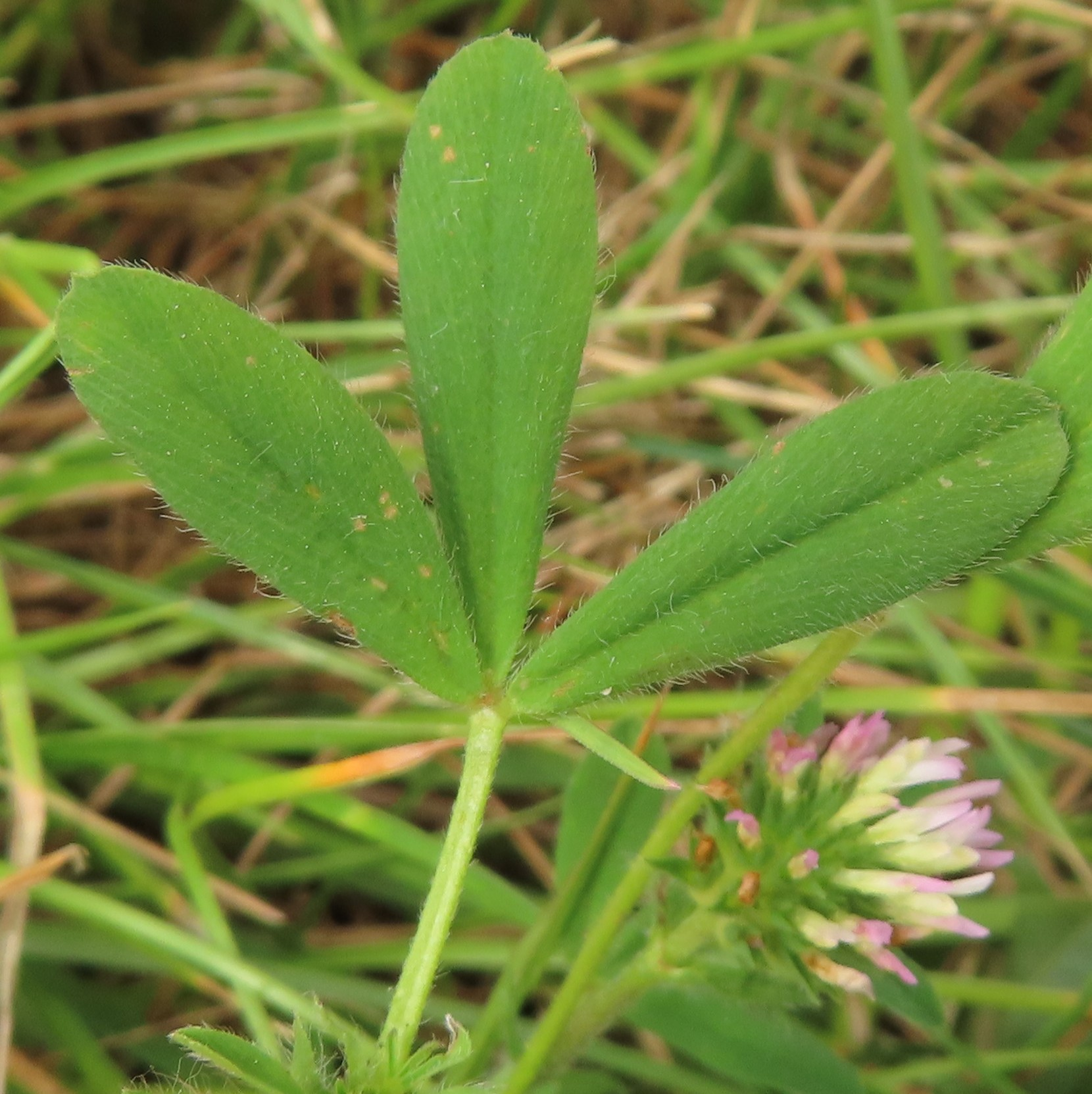
Each leaf has three narrow, stalkless, obovate leaflets

After flowering, the calyx teeth curve outwards, giving the fruiting heads a starry appearance. The fruit is an obovoid legume about 2.5 mm long containing round seeds about 2 mm in diameter.

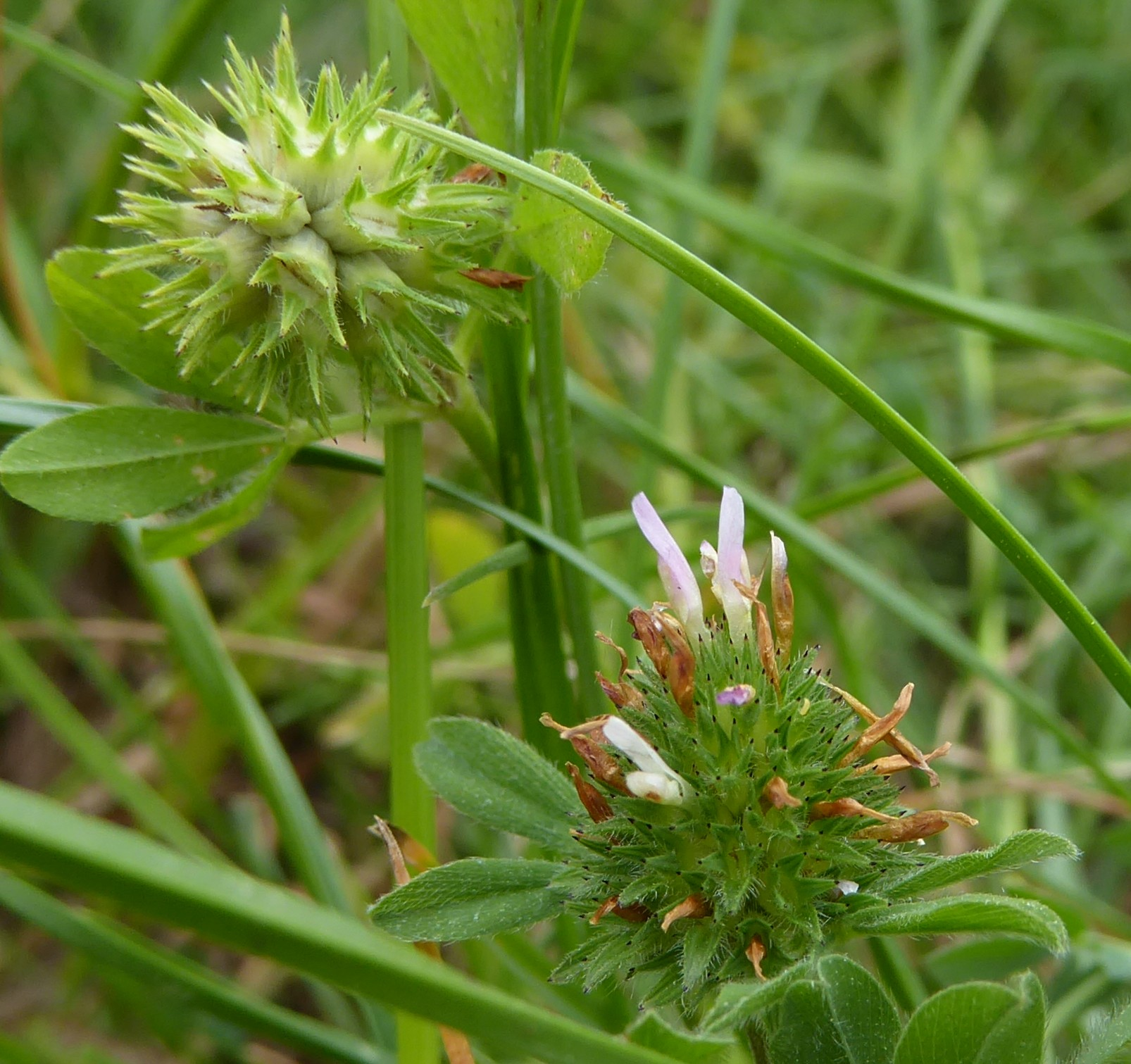
Details of the calyx in flower and fruit

== Taxonomy ==
Sea clover was first recognised as a new species by Thomas Johnson, who found it in a saltmarsh at Dartford on 10^{th} June 1633 and named it Trifolium stellatum glabrum, or "smooth starrie-headed trefoile'", in his revised edition of Gerard's Herball that same year.

Linnaeus was impressed by the work of the early British botanists, especially Dillenius, who had produced, in his opinion, the most perfect ("perfectissima") Flora in his edition of John Ray's Synopsis methodica stirpium Britannicarum in 1724, so in 1759 he published a list of the plants of "Anglia" (Britain and Ireland) in his book Amoenitates Academicae (vol. 4, p. 105). This included, from Dillenius's Flora, Johnson's smooth starrie clover, which he renamed Trifolium squamosum. This name takes precedence because it is a properly formulated binomial, unlike Johnson's earlier polynomial. The epithet squamosum means "scaly", but Linnaeus provided no explanation.

William Hudson was probably unaware of when he called sea clover Trifolium maritimum, or Trifolium spicis villosis globosis, calycibus patulis aequalibus, caule adscendente foliolis cuneiformibus hirsutis ("the trefoil with hairy globose spikes, equal gaping calyces, ascending stem and wedge-shaped hairy leaves") in his Flora Anglica in 1762. As this was three years after Linnaeus's list, it stands only as the first synonym, of which there are now many.

Trifolium squamosum has a chromosome number of 2n = 16. It is not known to hybridise with any other plants and it has no currently accepted subspecies.

== Distribution and status ==
The native range of sea clover is along the Atlantic coasts of Europe, from Britain to Spain and in the western Mediterranean, including North Africa, becoming rare beyond Greece and into the Black Sea. It is generally coastal but extends inland in parts of France, Spain and Greece. It is considered an introduction further north, in Belgium, Germany and the former Czechoslovakia, and it has been established in some remote parts of the world, including California and southern Australia.

Its global threat status has not been evaluated, but in England and Wales it is classified as LC (least concern) on the grounds that it is not declining, although its range has decreased dramatically since the 1930s and losses are continuing. One author has calculated that it has declined by 49% in less than a century. Previously, it was considered nationally scarce on the basis that there were only 60 hectads (dots on the map) for it in the 1990s. A study of clovers in the Mediterranean classified it as very common in Greece, common in Portugal, Spain, France and Italy, and rare in Croatia.

Where it occurs in England and Wales it is classified as an axiophyte, which means it is of nature conservation importance.

== Habitat and ecology ==
In Britain, sea clover grows mostly in coastal areas, typically in grassy upper saltmarsh habitats. With its upright growth habit, it is not tolerant of heavy grazing or mowing and, because it is an annual, it tends to grow on patches of bare ground. This makes it difficult to describe a vegetation community: most of its sites are probably in upper saltmarsh communities such as sea rush swards (A2.532 in the EUNIS habitat system), sea couch saltmarsh (SM24 in the NVC) or tall fescue grassland (MG12) (although it was not recorded at all in the NVC project) but it seems to occur in disturbed areas which are not typical of the habitat. It is considered a therophyte, which means that it grows quickly to exploit its niche and produces its seeds early in the year.

The most likely place to find it in modern Britain is behind sea defences, particularly in the estuaries of the Thames and Severn. Here, it often grows along the side of the access track that often traces the landward edge of the sea wall. The disturbance associated with roads and tracks also accounts for its presence in inland sites, although it does not tend to persist.

Further south sea clover is much less restricted to coastal areas. In Greece, for instance, it grows in fields, grasslands and forests up to 1,000 m (3,300 ft) above sea level.

Its Ellenberg-type indicator values are L=9, F=6, R=6, N=7 and S=2, which show that it has a preference for bright sunlight, slightly (or seasonally) damp conditions, neutral pH, low fertility and some salinity.

A few insects pests have been identified in Europe, but none in Britain yet:

- the weevil Protapion difforme feeds on this plant;
- the larvae of the beetle Bruchidius pygmaeus bore into the seeds;
- the scale insect Pseudococcus aridorum lives on the stems.

One type of fungus, Uromyces fallens, has been recorded causing pustules on the leaves.
