= British NVC community OV8 =

UK plant community type

British NVC community OV8 (Veronica persica - Alopecurus myosuroides community) is one of the open habitat communities in the British National Vegetation Classification system. It is one of eight arable weed and wasteland communities of fertile loams and clays.

This community is essentially the same as the Alopecuro-Chamomilletum recutitae assemblage of Wasscher 1941, though the latter is now usually treated as part of the Veronico - Lamietum hybridi assemblage.

It is a widespread community. There are no subcommunities.

== Community composition ==
The following constant species are found in this community:

- Black-grass (Alopecurus myosuroides)
- Black-bindweed (Fallopia convolvulus)
- Common couch (Elymus repens)
- Knotgrass (Polygonum aviculare)
- Common chickweed (Stellaria media)
- Common field-speedwell (Veronica persica)

There are no rare species associated with the community.

== Distribution ==
This is a weed community that is associated with winter-sown arable crops on heavy loams and clays. Its distribution is dictated by the range of Alopecurus myosuroides which, in Britain, is common only in the south-east Midlands and East Anglia, and locally as far west as Dorset.
