= British NVC community OV42 =

UK plant community type

British NVC community OV42 (Cymbalaria muralis community) is one of the open habitat communities in the British National Vegetation Classification system. It is one of six communities of crevice, scree and spoil vegetation.

It is widely distributed in suitable habitat throughout the lowlands of Britain.

There are no subcommunities.

== Community composition ==
One constant species is found in this community:

- Ivy-leaved toadflax (Cymbalaria muralis)

No rare species are associated with the community.

== Distribution ==
This is a widely distributed community throughout lowland Britain. It is found in sunny positions in crevices in stone and brick walls. In the south and east it can occur with, or be replaced by, the Parietaria diffusa community (OV41). On walls with a more lime-rich mortar the Asplenium trichomanes - Asplenium ruta-muraria community (OV39) can replace it.

This community is the British equivalent of the Cymbalarietum muralis Görs 1966 syntaxon, which has been described from other parts of Europe.
