= British NVC community OV16 =

UK plant community type

British NVC community OV16 (Papaver rhoeas - Silene noctiflora community) is one of the open habitat communities in the British National Vegetation Classification system. It is one of two arable weed communities of light lime-rich soils.

This community is the British equivalent of the Papaveri-Sileneetum noctiflori syntaxon first described by Wasscher (1941) from the Netherlands.

It is found in southern and eastern England, from Dorset, London, Wiltshire to Lincolnshire.

There are no subcommunities.

== Community composition ==
The following constant species are found in this community:

- Black-bindweed (Fallopia convolvulus)
- Common couch (Elymus repens)
- Scentless mayweed (Matricaria perforata)
- Common poppy (Papaver rhoeas)
- Knotgrass (Polygonum aviculare)
- Night-flowering catchfly (Silene noctiflora)
- Common chickweed (Stellaria media)
- Common field-speedwell (Veronica persica)

One rare species is associated with the community:

- Night-flowering catchfly (Silene noctiflora)

== Distribution ==
This community is restricted to the warmer south and east of England, from Dorset and Wiltshire in the south to Lincolnshire in the east. The most distinctive species in the community is the nationally scarce Silene noctiflora, which requires lime-rich soils. The community is most often found among cereal crops which have not been heavily fertilised or treated with herbicides.
