= John Rodwell =

John Rodwell may refer to:

- John S. Rodwell, ecologist
- John Medows Rodwell, English clergyman and Islamic studies scholar

== See also ==
- Jack Rodwell, English footballer
