= British NVC community OV15 =

UK plant community type

British NVC community OV15 (Anagallis arvensis - Veronica persica community) is one of the open habitat communities in the British National Vegetation Classification system. It is one of two arable weed communities of light lime-rich soils.

It is a widely distributed community in south-east England, but is found only locally, its distribution being restricted to areas of suitable soils.

There are four subcommunities.

== Community composition ==
The following constant species are found in this community:

- Scarlet pimpernel (Anagallis arvensis)
- Black-bindweed (Fallopia convolvulus)
- Knotgrass (Polygonum aviculare)
- Common field-speedwell (Veronica persica)

Two rare species are associated with the community:

- Ground-pine (Ajuga chamaepitys)
- Shepherd's-needle (Scandix pecten-veneris)

A distinctive feature of most occurrences of this community is the presence, in mid- to late-summer, of Kickxia, represented by one or both of K. spuria and K. elatine, and Euphorbia exigua.

== Distribution ==
This community occurs widely across south-east England, but, being dependent on lime-rich soils, it occurs only locally, typically as a weed community of cereal crops.

It is essentially the same as the Kickxietum spuriae assemblage described by Kruseman and Vlieger.

== Subcommunities ==
There are three subcommunities:

- the Stellaria media - Convolvulus arvensis subcommunity
- the Legousia hybrida - Chaenorhinum minus subcommunity
- the Agrostis stolonifera - Phascum cuspidatum subcommunity
