= Polygonum striatum =

Polygonum striatum is a botanical synonym of two species of plant:

- Polygonum aviculare, synonym published in 1849 by Karl Koch
- Fallopia convolvulus, synonym published in 1867 by Joseph Dulac (1827–1897)
