= British NVC community OV14 =

Open habitat community

British NVC community OV14 (Urtica urens - Lamium amplexicaule community) is one of the open habitat communities in the British National Vegetation Classification system. It is one of eight arable weed and wasteland communities of fertile loams and clays.

It is a widespread community, with no subcommunities.

== Community composition ==
The following constant species are found in this community:

- Shepherd's-purse (Capsella bursa-pastoris)
- Fat-hen (Chenopodium album)
- Annual meadow-grass (Poa annua)
- Groundsel (Senecio vulgaris)
- Common chickweed (Stellaria media)
- Small nettle (Urtica urens)

There are three rare species associated with the community:

- Musk stork's-bill (Erodium moschatum)
- Toothed medick (Medicago polymorpha)
- London-rocket (Sisymbrium irio)

== Distribution ==
This community is widespread throughout the lowlands of southern and eastern Britain and occurs locally on the eastern side of the country as far north as the lowlands of Scotland.

It occurs typically among root and vegetable crops on light soils that are fairly base-poor, being displaced by assemblages such as the Stellaria - Capsella community in areas that are more intensively fertilised.
