= British NVC community M16 =

UK plant community type

Within plant communities, NVC Community M16 (Erica tetralix - Sphagnum compactum wet heath) is one of the 38 mire communities in the British National Vegetation Classification system.

== Community composition ==
The following species are found in this community

- Erica tetralix
- Sphagnum compactum

== See also ==
- List of plant communities in the British National Vegetation Classification
