= British NVC community OV21 =

Open habitat community

British NVC community OV21 (Poa annua - Plantago major community) is one of the open habitat communities in the British National Vegetation Classification system. It is one of six communities characteristic of gateways, tracksides and courtyards.

This community is ubiquitous in the lowlands and upland fringes of Britain wherever there is suitable habitat.

There are three subcommunities.

== Community composition ==
The following constant species are found in this community:

- Scented mayweed (Matricaria chamomilla)
- Greater plantain (Plantago major)
- Annual meadow-grass (Poa annua)

There are no rare species associated with the community.

== Distribution ==
This community is ubiquitous in the lowlands and upland fringes of Britain. In rural areas it is found wherever farm tracks and gateways are heavily trampled; in urban areas it is a feature of recreational areas and wasteland, and can replace the Poa annua - Sagina procumbens community, OV18, in paved areas where crevices are large enough to permit the establishment of more robust vascular plants.

== Subcommunities ==
There are three subcommunities:

- the so-called typical subcommunity
- the Lolium perenne subcommunity
- the Polyonum aviculare - Ranunculus repens subcommunity
