= British NVC community A18 =

Ranunculetum fluitantis is one of the 24 Aquatic plant communities (A18) included in the British National Vegetation Classification (NVC).

The vegetation type or community comprises stands of submerged vegetation dominated by clumps of River water crowfoot. Few other plants are found with any frequency among the denser stands but there can be Myriophyllum; Potamogeton perfoliatus and patches of moss on submerged stones.
