= British NVC community OV9 =

UK plant community type

British NVC community OV9 (Matricaria perforata - Stellaria media community) is one of the open habitat communities in the British National Vegetation Classification system. It is one of eight arable weed and wasteland communities of fertile loams and clays.

It is a widely distributed community. There are four subcommunities.

== Community composition ==
The following constant species are found in this community:

- Scentless mayweed (Matricaria perforata)
- Knotgrass (Polygonum aviculare)
- Common chickweed (Stellaria media)

No rare species are associated with the community.

== Distribution ==
This is a widely distributed community, found throughout the British lowlands on disturbed, well-drained ground.

== Subcommunities ==
There are four subcommunities:

- the Anagallis arvensis - Viola arvensis subcommunity
- the Poa annua - Galeopsis tetrahit subcommunity
- the Elymus repens - Potentilla anserina subcommunity
- the Bilderdykia convolvulus - Veronica persica subcommunity
