= British NVC community OV18 =

Open habitat community

British NVC community OV18 (Polygonum aviculare - Chamomilla suavolens community) is one of the open habitat communities in the British National Vegetation Classification system. It is one of six communities characteristic of gateways, tracksides and courtyards.

This community is found throughout the lowlands and upland fringes of Britain on loamy and sandy soils that are disturbed or moderately trampled.

There are two subcommunities.

== Community composition ==
The following constant species are found in this community:

- Shepherd's-purse (Capsella bursa-pastoris)
- Scented mayweed (Matricaria chamomilla) (syn. Chamomilla suavolens)
- Perennial rye-grass (Lolium perenne)
- Annual meadow-grass (Poa annua)
- Knotgrass (Polygonum aviculare)

There are no rare species associated with the community.

== Distribution ==
This ephemeral community is widely distributed throughout the lowlands and upland fringes of Britain. It occurs on loamy and sandy soils that are subjected to disturbance and moderate trampling, such as around tracks and gateways on agricultural land, on wasteland, and in recreational areas. Where trampling is heavier, it is replaced by the Poa annua - Plantago major community, OV21.

== Subcommunities ==
There are two subcommunities:

- the Sisymbrium officinale - Polygonum arenastrum subcommunity
- the Plantago major subcommunity
