= Swamps and tall-herb fens in the British National Vegetation Classification system =

UK plant community type

This article gives an overview of the swamp and tall-herb fen communities in the British National Vegetation Classification system.

== Introduction ==
The swamp and tall-herb fen communities of the NVC were described in Volume 4 of British Plant Communities, first published in 1995, along with the aquatic communities.

In total, 28 swamp and tall-herb fen communities have been identified.

The swamp and tall-herb fen communities consist of three separate subgroups:

- twenty-one swamp communities, characterised by being species-poor, each dominated by an often tall or bulky monocotyledon species, with little or nothing in the way of an understorey: S1, S2, S3, S4, S5, S6, S7, S8, S9, S10, S11, S12, S13, S14, S15, S16, S17, S18, S19, S20 and S29
- two communities termed "water-margin vegetation": S22 and S23
- five tall-herb fen communities, which have a more species-rich understorey than the swamps: S24, S25, S26, S27 and S28

== List of swamp and tall-herb fen communities ==
The following is a list of the communities that make up this category:

- S1 Carex elata sedge-swamp Caricetum elatae Koch 1926
- S2 Cladium mariscus swamp and sedge-beds Cladietum marisci Zobrist 1933 emend. Pfeiffer 1961
- S3 Carex paniculata swamp Caricetum paniculatae Wangerin 1916
- S4 Phragmites australis swamp and reed-beds Phragmitetum australis (Gams 1927) Schmale 1939
- S5 Glyceria maxima swamp Glycerietum maximae (Nowinski 1928) Hueck 1931 emend. Krausch 1965
- S6 Carex riparia swamp Caricetum ripariae Soó 1928
- S7 Carex acutiformis swamp Caricetum acutiformis Sauer 1937
- S8 Scirpus lacustris ssp. lacustris swamp Scirpetum lacustris (Allorge 1922) Chouard 1924
- S9 Carex rostrata swamp Caricetum rostratae Rübel 1912
- S10 Equisetum fluviatile swamp Equisetetum fluviatile Steffen 1931 emend. Wilczek 1935
- S11 Carex vesicaria swamp Caricetum vesicariae Br.-Bl. & Denis 1926
- S12 Typha latifolia swamp Typhetum latifoliae Soó 1927
- S13 Typha angustifolia swamp Typhetum angustifoliae Soó 1927
- S14 Sparganium erectum swamp Sparganietum erecti Roll 1938
- S15 Acorus calamus swamp Acoretum calami Schulz 1941
- S16 Sagittaria sagittifolia swamp
- S17 Carex pseudocyperus swamp
- S18 Carex otrubae swamp Caricetum otrubae Mirza 1978
- S19 Eleocharis palustris swamp Eleocharitetum palustris Schennikow 1919
- S20 Scirpus lacustris ssp. tabernaemontani swamp Scirpetum tabernaemontani Passarge 1964
- S21 Scirpus maritimus swamp Scirpetum maritimi (Br.-Bl. 1931) R.Tx. 1937
- S22 Glyceria fluitans water-margin vegetation Glycerietum fluitantis Wilczek 1935
- S23 Other water-margin vegetation Glycerio-Sparganion Br.-Bl. & Sissingh apud Boer 1942 emend. Segal
- S24 Phragmites australis - Peucedanum palustre tall-herb fen Peucedano-Phragmitetum australis Wheeler 1978 emend.
- S25 Phragmites australis - Eupatorium cannabinum tall-herb fen
- S26 Phragmites australis - Urtica dioica tall-herb fen
- S27 Carex rostrata - Potentilla palustris tall-herb fen Potentillo-Caricetum rostratae Wheeler 1980a
- S28 Phalaris arundinacea tall-herb fen Phalaridetum arundinaceae Libbert 1931
