= British NVC community OV7 =

UK plant community type

British NVC community OV7 (Veronica persica - Veronica polita community) is one of the open habitat communities in the British National Vegetation Classification system. It is one of eight arable weed and wasteland communities of fertile loams and clays.

It is a widespread community.

There are no subcommunities.

== Community composition ==
The following constant species are found in this community:

- Black-bindweed (Fallopia convolvulus)
- Fat-hen (Chenopodium album)
- Scentless mayweed (Matricaria perforata)
- Knotgrass (Polygonum aviculare)
- Common chickweed (Stellaria media)
- Common field-speedwell (Veronica persica)
- Grey field-speedwell (Veronica polita)

There are no rare species associated with the community.

== Distribution ==
This is a weed community that is associated with annual arable crops on light, well-drained, fertile soils, typically occurring patchily within and at the edges of such crops. It occurs widely in southern and eastern Britain and locally in coastal arable fields elsewhere.

This community is essentially the same as the Veronico - Lamietum hybridi assemblage of Kruseman & Vlieger 1939, though Lamium hybridum is not always present in the British community.
