= British NVC community OV11 =

UK plant community type

British NVC community OV11 (Poa annua - Stachys arvensis community) is one of the open habitat communities in the British National Vegetation Classification system. It is one of eight arable weed and wasteland communities of fertile loams and clays.

It is a regionalised community, in which two subcommunities are recognised.

== Community composition ==
The following constant species are found in this community:

- Scarlet pimpernel (Anagallis arvensis)
- Annual meadow-grass (Poa annua)
- Knotgrass (Polygonum aviculare)
- Field woundwort (Stachys arvensis)

One rare species is associated with the community:

- Tall ramping-fumitory (Fumaria bastardii)

== Subcommunities ==
There are two subcommunities:

- the Chenopodium album - Euphorbia helioscopia subcommunity
- the Cerastium fontanum - Bryum rubens subcommunity

== Distribution ==
This community is mainly confined to south-west England and Wales, and is mostly found among cereal crops on less-limey loams and clay-loams.
