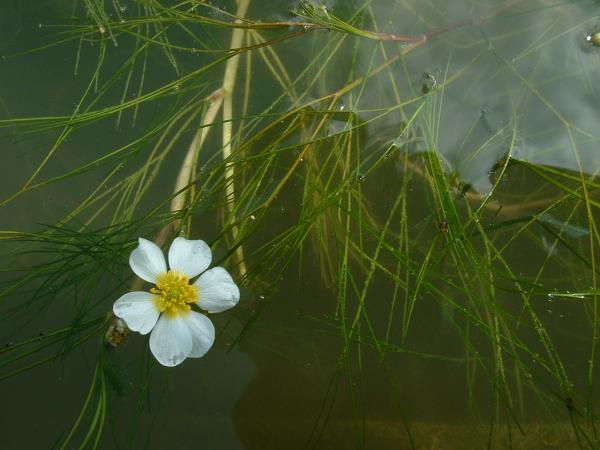

Conservation status
- Least Concern (IUCN 3.1)

Scientific classification
- Kingdom: Plantae
- Clade: Embryophytes
- Clade: Tracheophytes
- Clade: Spermatophytes
- Clade: Angiosperms
- Clade: Eudicots
- Order: Ranunculales
- Family: Ranunculaceae
- Genus: Ranunculus
- Species: R. fluitans

Binomial name
- Ranunculus fluitans Lam

Synonyms
- Batrachium bachii Wirtg. ex F.Schultz; Batrachium fluitans Wimm.; Batrachium peucedanifolium Dumort.; Batrachium pumilum Nyman

= Ranunculus fluitans =

Species of plant

Ranunculus fluitans (the river water-crowfoot,) is a species of buttercup. It is a perennial water plant, which when in favourable conditions (such as fast flowing water,) can grow up to 6 m (20 ft) height.

== Description ==
Ranunculus fluitans has no floating leaves, instead it has long and narrow, tassel-like segments. Reaching up to 30 cm (12 in) long. The long, slender stems can have up to two flower stems. The white flowers are held above the water level, they are around 2–3 cm across. They are daisy-like, with 6–8 overlapping petals around a central yellow area. It blooms in June, then the rounded seed heads become hairless fruits. It is similar in form to Ranunculus trichophyllus (thread-leaved water-crowfoot), principal differences being flower petal number- thread-leaved has only 5 petals and shorter leaves- and different preferred habitat- thread-leaved prefers slower flowing waters.

== Taxonomy ==
It was formally described by the French naturalist and botanist Jean-Baptiste Lamarck in his book 'Flore françoise' Vol.3 on page 184 in 1779.

The species epithet fluitans is Latin for floating.

== Distribution ==
It is endemic to western Europe.

=== Range ===
It can be found in North Macedonia, Ireland, the United Kingdom, southern Sweden, France, Germany, Poland, Switzerland, Austria, the Czech Republic, Slovenia, Slovakia, Hungary, Spain and Italy. It grows in fast flowing waters of the UK, within England, Scotland and Wales.

== Ecology ==
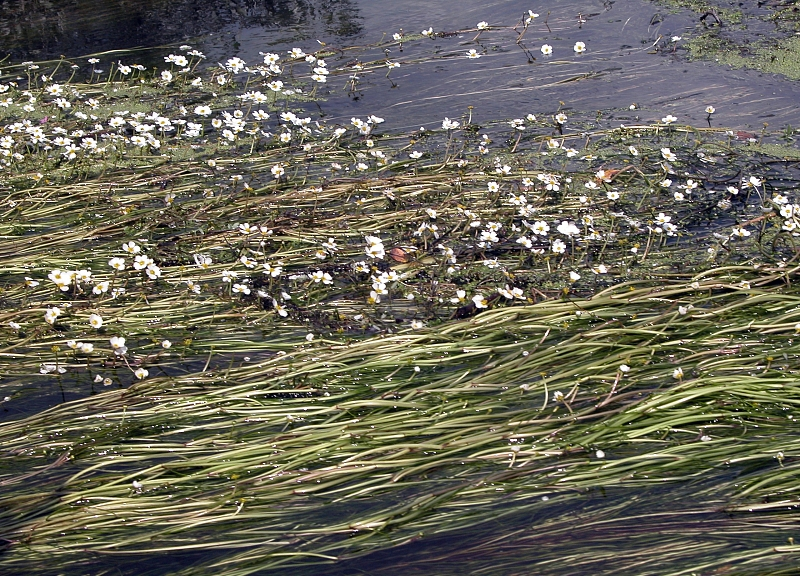
Crowfoot growing in a river in Germany

A Ranunculus fluitans community or Ranunculion fluitantis, defines a British plant community comprising stands of submerged vegetation dominated by clumps of crowfoot. It is thought to be vulnerable in Sweden and near threatened in Switzerland, but elsewhere it is widespread and abundant.

== Culture ==
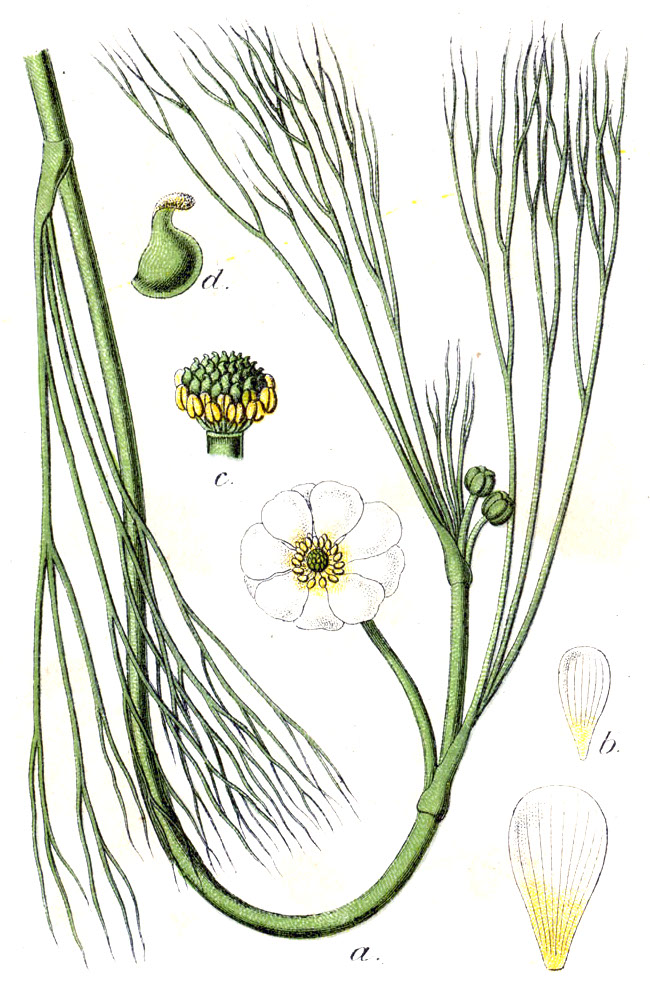
Illustration of the plant from 'Deutschlands Flora in Abbildungen' by Jacob Sturm

William Barnes (1801–1886) an English writer, poet and Church of England priest, referred to the plant in his poem 'The Water Crowfoot'.

O small feac'd flow'r that now dost bloom
To stud wi'white the shallow Frome,
An' leave the clote to spread his flow'r
On darksome pools o' stwoneless Stour.

This refers to the River Frome's being at danger from man's interference.
