= British NVC community OV26 =

Open habitat community

British NVC community OV26 (Epilobium hirsutum community) is one of the open habitat communities in the British National Vegetation Classification system. It is one of four tall-herb weed communities.

This community is found throughout lowland Britain.

There are five subcommunities.

== Community composition ==
The following constant species are found in this community:

- Great willowherb (Epilobium hirsutum)
- Common nettle (Urtica dioica)

There are no rare species associated with the community.

== Distribution ==
This community is found throughout lowland Britain. It occurs on moist, but not waterlogged soils, and is one of the transitional vegetation types around open water and alongside lowland streams; it is often found on damp verges and in ditches alongside roads and tracks.

== Subcommunities ==
There are five subcommunities:

- the Juncus effusus - Ranunculus repens subcommunity
- the Phragmites australis - Iris pseudacorus subcommunity
- the Filipendula ulmaria - Angelica sylvestris subcommunity
- the Arrhenatherum elatius - Heracleum sphondylium subcommunity
- the Urtica dioica - Cirsium arvense subcommunity
