= British NVC community CG4 =

UK plant community type

NVC community CG4 (Brachypodium pinnatum grassland) is one of the calcicolous grassland communities in the British National Vegetation Classification system. It is one of four communities of rank, tussocky grassland associated with low levels of grazing, within the lowland calcicolous grassland group.

It is a comparatively widely distributed community. There are three subcommunities.

== Community composition ==
The following constant species are found in this community:

- Tor-grass (Brachypodium pinnatum)
- Glaucous Sedge (Carex flacca)
- Sheep's Fescue (Festuca ovina)

The following rare species are also associated with the community:

- Purple Milk-vetch (Astragalus danicus)
- Musk Orchid (Herminium monorchis)

== Distribution ==
This community is found in lowland limestone grassland throughout England.

== Subcommunities ==
There are three subcommunities:

- the so-called typical subcommunity:
- the Avenula pratensis - Thymus praecox subcommunity
- the Centaurea nigra - Leontodon hispidus subcommunity
- the Holcus lanatus subcommunity
