= British NVC community SD2 =

UK plant community type

NVC community SD2 (Honkenya peploides - Cakile maritima strandline community) is one of two strandline community in the British National Vegetation Classification system.

It is a fairly widely distributed community. There are no subcommunities.

== Community composition ==
Two constant species, Sea Rocket (Cakile maritima) and Sea Sandwort (Honkenya peploides), are found in this community.

One rare species, Ray's Knotgrass (Polygonum oxyspermum ssp. raii), is also associated with the community:

== Distribution ==
This community is found in many localities in Scotland, on the east coast of England, in North Wales, the Isle of Man, and the Isles of Scilly.
