= British NVC community OV19 =

UK plant community type

British NVC community OV19 (Poa annua - Matricaria perforata community) is one of the open habitat communities in the British National Vegetation Classification system. It is one of six communities characteristic of gateways, tracksides and courtyards.

This community is found throughout the lowlands of Britain wherever there is suitable habitat.

There are five subcommunities.

== Community composition ==
The following constant species are found in this community:

- Shepherd's-purse (Capsella bursa-pastoris)
- Scentless mayweed (Matricaria perforata)
- Annual meadow-grass (Poa annua)

There are no rare species associated with the community.

== Distribution ==
This ephemeral community is widely distributed throughout the lowlands of Britain. Characteristic habitats are on farm tracks, around gateways where trampling is only moderate, and on verges alongside roads, wherever disturbance and spray-wash from vehicles prevents the development of a closed perennial sward.

== Subcommunities ==
There are five subcommunities:

- the Senecio squalidus - Epilobium angustifolium subcommunity
- the Lolium perenne - Capsella bursa-pastoris subcommunity
- the Atriplex prostrata - Chenopodium album subcommunity
- the Chamomilla suaveolens - Plantago major subcommunity
- the Elymus repens subcommunity
