= British NVC community OV27 =

Open habitat community

British NVC community OV27 (Epilobium angustifolium community) is one of the open habitat communities in the British National Vegetation Classification system. It is one of four tall-herb weed communities.

This community is found throughout lowland Britain in suitable habitats.

There are five subcommunities.

== Community composition ==
The following constant species is found in this community:

- Rosebay willowherb (Epilobium angustifolium)

There are no rare species associated with the community.

== Distribution ==
This community is found throughout lowland Britain in suitable habitats. It occurs on damp, fertile, disturbed soils, in woodlands, on heaths, on road verges and railway embankments, and on recreational and waste ground. It is particularly characteristic of areas that have been burned by fires.

== Subcommunities ==
There are five subcommunities:

- the Holcus lanatus - Festuca ovina subcommunity
- the Urtica dioica - Cirsium arvense subcommunity
- the Rubus fruticosus agg. - Dryopteris dilitata subcommunity
- the Acer pseudoplatanus - Sambucus nigra subcommunity
- the Ammophila arenaria subcommunity
