= British NVC community OV37 =

UK plant community type

British NVC community OV37 (Festuca ovina - Minuartia verna community) is one of the open habitat communities in the British National Vegetation Classification system. It is one of six communities of crevice, scree and spoil vegetation.

This is a localised community, which is restricted to heavy-metal soils in the upland fringes of northern and western Britain.

There are three subcommunities.

== Community composition ==
The following constant species are found in this community:

- Common bent (Agrostis capillaris)
- Harebell (Campanula rotundifolia)
- Sheep's-fescue (Festuca ovina)
- Spring sandwort (Minuartia verna)
- Wild thyme (Thymus praecox)

There are no rare species associated with the community.

== Distribution ==
This community is restricted to areas where soils are affected by the presence of heavy metals, particularly zinc. It is found on the spoil heaps of lead mines and around outcrops of veins of heavy metals, most commonly in the limestone uplands of the Mendips, the dales of Derbyshire and Yorkshire, and the north Pennines.

This community is synonymous with the Minuartio - Lamietum alpestris Kock 1932, which was first described in Britain by Shimwell.

== Subcommunities ==
There are three subcommunities:

- the so-called typical subcommunity
- the Achillea millefolium - Euphrasia officinalis subcommunity
- the Cladonia spp. subcommunity
