= British NVC community S1 =

UK plant community type

NVC community S1 (Carex elata sedge-swamp or Tufted Sedge swamp) is one of the swamp communities in the British National Vegetation Classification system.

It is a fairly localised community. There are no subcommunities.

== Community composition ==
There is one constant species found in this community: Tufted Sedge (Carex elata).

One rare species is associated with the community: Narrow Small-reed (Calamagrostis stricta).

== Distribution ==
This community is present in a few localities in west Norfolk, Anglesey and Cumbria.
