= British NVC community OV3 =

UK plant community type

British NVC community OV3 (Papaver rhoeas - Viola arvensis community) is one of the open habitat communities in the British National Vegetation Classification system. It is one of six arable weed and track-side communities of light, less-fertile acid soils.

It is a widespread community. There are no subcommunities.

== Community composition ==
The following constant species are found in this community:

- Scarlet pimpernel (Anagallis arvensis)
- Black medick (Medicago lupulina)
- Common poppy (Papaver rhoeas)
- Annual meadow-grass (Poa annua)
- Knotgrass (Polygonum aviculare)
- Common field-speedwell (Veronica persica)
- Field pansy (Viola arvensis)

One rare species is associated with the community:

- Fingered speedwell (Veronica triphyllos)

== Distribution ==
This community is confined to disturbed, light, friable soils. It is found especially in cereal fields that have not been treated with herbicides. It is widespread in southern Britain and has been recorded as far north as Angus, Scotland, but its persistence in any one locality depends on a pattern of frequent disturbance without heavy applications of fertilisers or herbicides.
