= British NVC community OV24 =

Open habitat community

British NVC community OV24 (Urtica dioica - Galium aparine community) is one of the open habitat communities in the British National Vegetation Classification system. It is one of four tall-herb weed communities.

This community occurs widely throughout lowland Britain and, if conditions are suitable, is also found in the upland fringes.

There are two subcommunities.

== Community composition ==
The following constant species are found in this community:

- Cleavers (Galium aparine)
- Common nettle (Urtica dioica)

There is one rare species associated with the community:

- Three-cornered garlic (Allium triquetrum)

== Distribution ==
This community occurs widely throughout lowland Britain. Under suitable conditions, it is also found in the upland fringes. It typically occurs on disturbed, nutrient-rich soils and is frequently found around dumps of rich soil, dung, or farm waste, in neglected gardens and around abandoned buildings, on waste land, and on disturbed verges and tracks. It develops best in conditions of partial shade.

== Subcommunities ==
There are two subcommunities:

- the so-called typical subcommunity
- the Arrhenatherum elatius - Rubus fruticosus agg. subcommunity
