= British NVC community OV38 =

Open habitat community

British NVC community OV38 (Gymnocarpium robertianum - Arrhenatherum elatius community) is one of the open habitat communities in the British National Vegetation Classification system. It is one of six communities of crevice, scree and spoil vegetation.

This is a localised community, which is restricted to areas of calcareous bedrock, mostly Carboniferous limestone, in England and Wales.

There are no subcommunities.

== Community composition ==
The following constant species are found in this community:

- False oat-grass (Arrhenatherum elatius)
- Red/Sheep's-fescue (Festuca rubra/Festuca ovina)
- Herb-Robert (Geranium robertianum)
- Limestone fern (Gymnocarpium robertianum)
- Wood sage (Teucrium scorodonia)
- Comb-moss (Ctenidium molluscum)

There are no rare species associated with the community.

== Distribution ==
This is a local community, found mainly on Carboniferous limestone in England and Wales. It is an early coloniser of limestone screes and slopes, but is only able to persist if the talus if especially coarse or if there is limited grazing, both conditions which inhibit invasion by scrub and woodland species.

This community was first described in Britain by Shimwell, who assigned it to the Gymnocarpietum robertianae (Kuhn 1937), previously described from Germany.
