= Calcifugous grasslands and montane communities in the British National Vegetation Classification system =

UK plant community type

Calcifugous grasslands and montane communities are botanical groupings in the British National Vegetation Classification system.

The calcifugous grasslands and montane communities of the NVC are described in Volume 3 of British Plant Communities, first published in 1992, along with the mesotrophic grassland communities and the calcicolous grassland communities.

In total, 21 calcifugous grasslands and montane communities have been identified.

The calcifugous grasslands and montane communities consist of the following groupings:

- five grass-dominated communities which group together as "sub-montane calcifugous grasslands"; two of these, U1 and U2 are found throughout Britain, two more U4 and U5 are found throughout upland areas of Scotland, Wales and northern and western England, and one, U3, is localised in southwest England.
- a sixth submontane community, U6, dominated by Heath Rush Juncus squarrosus
- four communities categorised as "calcifugous vegetation of low- and middle-alpine snow-fields", all of which are confined or nearly confined to Scotland: U7, U8, U11 and U12
- two moss- and rush-heaths of low- and middle-alpine plateaus U10, which is confined to Scotland, and U9 which is also found in northern England and North Wales
- five communities grouped together as "mesotrophic montane swards and herb-rich banks and ledges": U13, U14, U15, U16 and U17; some of these are confined to Scotland while others extend into northern England or North Wales
- four calcifuge fern communities, one of which, U20, is widespread; the remaining three (U18, U19 and U21) are confined to upland areas of northern and western Britain

== List of calcifugous grasslands and montane communities ==
The following is a list of the communities that make up this category:

- U1 Festuca ovina – Agrostris capillaris – Rumex acetosella grassland
- U2 Deschampsia flexuosa grassland
- U3 Agrostis curtisii grassland
- U4 Festuca ovina – Agrostris capillaris – Galium saxatile grassland
- U5 Nardus stricta – Galium saxatile grassland
- U6 Juncus squarrosus – Festuca ovina grassland
- U7 Nardus stricta – Carex bigelowii grass-heath
- U8 Carex bigelowii – Polytrichum alpinum sedge-heath
- U9 Juncus trifidus – Racomitrium lanuginosum rush-heath
- U10 Carex bigelowii – Racomitrium lanuginosum moss-heath
- U11 Polytrichum sexangulare – Kiaeria starkei snow-bed
- U12 Salix herbacea – Racomitrium heterostichum snow-bed
- U13 Deschampsia cespitosa – Galium saxatile grassland
- U14 Alchemilla alpina – Sibbaldia procumbens dwarf-herb community
- U15 Saxifraga aizoides – Alchemilla glabra banks
- U16 Luzula sylvatica – Vaccinium myrtillus tall-herb community
- U17 Luzula sylvatica – Geum rivale tall-herb community
- U18 Cryptogramma crispa – Athyrium distentifolium snow-bed
- U19 Thelypteris limbosperma – Blechnum spicant community
- U20 Pteridium aquilinum – Galium saxatile community
- U21 Cryptogramma crispa – Deschampsia flexuosa community
