= British NVC community OV25 =

Open habitat community

British NVC community OV25 (Urtica dioica - Cirsium arvense community) is one of the open habitat communities in the British National Vegetation Classification system. It is one of four tall-herb weed communities.

This community is found throughout lowland Britain.

There are three subcommunities.

== Community composition ==
The following constant species are found in this community:

- Creeping thistle (Cirsium arvense)
- Common nettle (Urtica dioica)

There are no rare species associated with the community.

== Distribution ==
This community is found throughout lowland Britain, on disturbed, nutrient-rich soils, usually where there are patches of bare or lightly covered ground, in which thistles can establish themselves. It is typically found in poorly managed meadows, on abandoned arable land or waste land, on disturbed verges and tracks, and in cleared woodland or young plantations.

== Subcommunities ==
There are three subcommunities:

- the Holcus lanatus - Poa annua subcommunity
- the Rumex obtusifolius - Artemisia vulgaris subcommunity
- the Lolium perenne - Papaver rhoeas subcommunity
