= British NVC community OV23 =

Open habitat community

British NVC community OV23 (Lolium perenne - Dactylis glomerata community) is one of the open habitat communities in the British National Vegetation Classification system. It is one of six communities characteristic of gateways, tracksides and courtyards.

This community occurs widely throughout lowland Britain.

There are four subcommunities.

== Community composition ==
The following constant species are found in this community:

- Cock's-foot (Dactylis glomerata)
- Perennial rye-grass (Lolium perenne)
- Ribwort plantain (Plantago lanceolata)
- Dandelion (Taraxacum officinale agg.)

There are no rare species associated with the community.

== Distribution ==
This community occurs widely throughout lowland Britain. It is often found on verges, recreational areas and waste ground that have been re-seeded but only occasionally mown and usually forms a mosaic with other communities, the degree of trampling and disturbance being major determinants in the occurrence of one community or another.

== Subcommunities ==
There are four subcommunities:

- the so-called typical subcommunity
- the Crepis vesicaria - Rumex obtusifolius subcommunity
- the Plantago major - Trifolium repens subcommunity
- the Arrhenatherum elatius - Medicago lupulina subcommunity
