= British NVC community OV4 =

UK plant community type

British NVC community OV4 (Chrysanthemum segetum - Spergula arvensis community) is one of the open habitat communities in the British National Vegetation Classification system. It is one of six arable weed and track-side communities of light, less-fertile acid soils.

It is widely distributed, and there are two subcommunities.

== Community composition ==
The following constant species are found in this community:

- Corn marigold (Chrysanthemum segetum)
- Annual meadow-grass (Poa annua)
- Knotgrass (Polygonum aviculare)
- Corn spurrey (Spergula arvensis)

No rare species are associated with the community.

== Distribution ==
This is a widely distributed community, most commonly found in western Britain.

== Subcommunities ==
The two subcommunities are:

- the so-called typical subcommunity
- the Ranunculus repens - Sonchus asper subcommunity
