= British NVC community A9 =

The Potamogeton natans community (NVC community A9) is one of the aquatic communities in the British National Vegetation Classification system.

It is a comparatively widely distributed community. There are three subcommunities.

== Community composition ==
One constant species is found in this community, Broad-leaved Pondweed (Potamogeton natans).

No rare species are associated with the community.

== Distribution ==
This community is found widely throughout Britain.

== Subcommunities ==
There are three subcommunities:

- the so-called Species-poor subcommunity
- the Elodea canadensis subcommunity
- the Juncus bulbosus - Myriophyllum alterniflorum subcommunity
