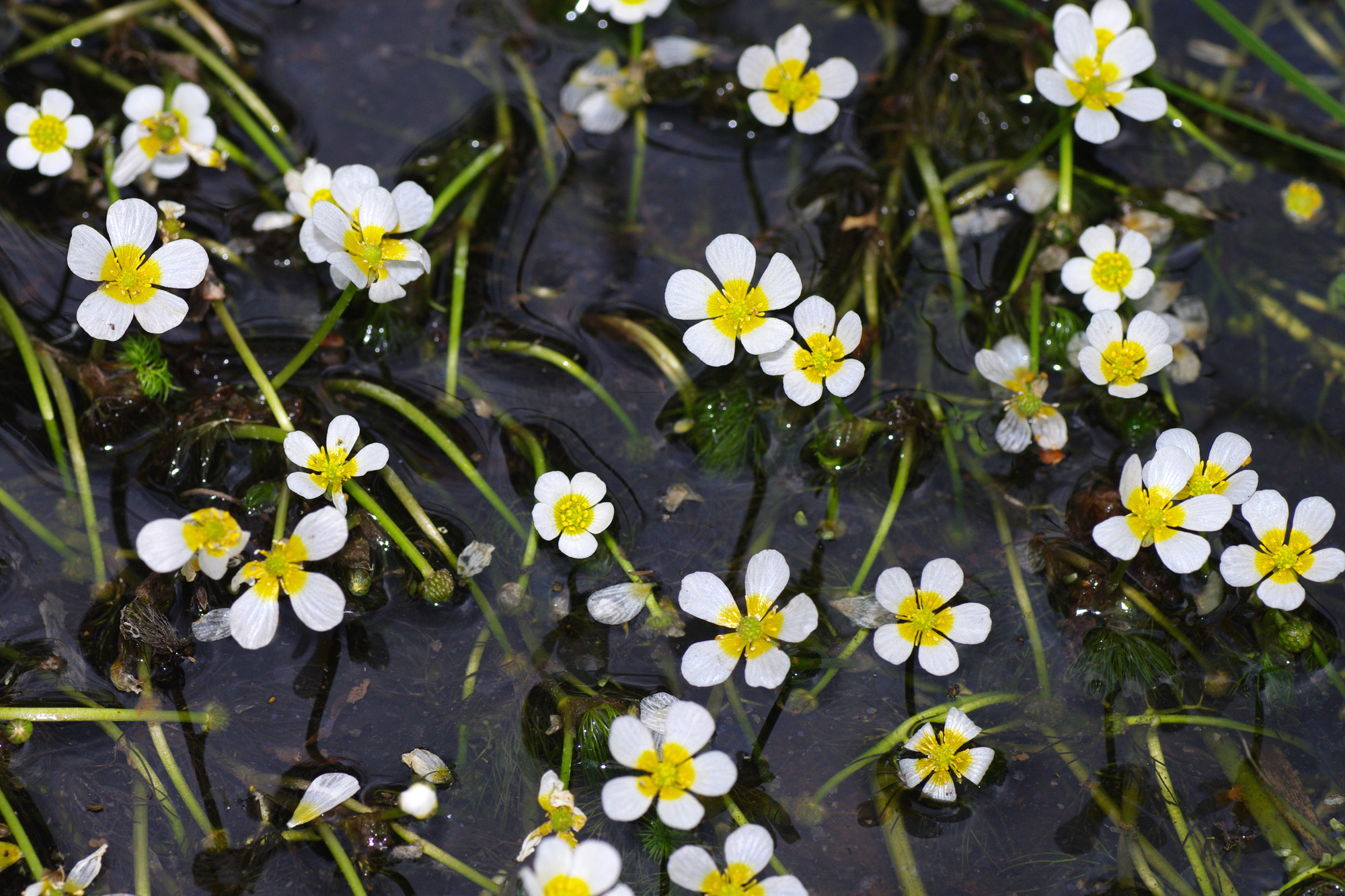

Conservation status
- Least Concern (IUCN 3.1)

Scientific classification
- Kingdom: Plantae
- Clade: Tracheophytes
- Clade: Angiosperms
- Clade: Eudicots
- Order: Ranunculales
- Family: Ranunculaceae
- Genus: Ranunculus
- Species: R. trichophyllus

Binomial name
- Ranunculus trichophyllus Chaix ex Vill.

Synonyms
- Ranunculus aquatilis var. capillaceus (Thuill.) DC.; Ranunculus aquatilis var. trichophyllus (Chaix ex Vill.) A. Gray; Ranunculus trichophyllus var. trichophyllus (None Known)

= Ranunculus trichophyllus =

Species of flowering plant

Ranunculus trichophyllus, the threadleaf crowfoot, or thread-leaved water-crowfoot, is a plant species in the genus Ranunculus, native to Europe, Asia and North America.

It is a herbaceous annual or perennial plant generally found in slow flowing streams, ponds, or lakes. The daisy-like flowers are white with a yellow centre, with five petals. It is similar in form to Ranunculus fluitans (river water-crowfoot), apart from flower petal number, thread-leaved has on 5 petals and shorter leaves, as thread-leaved prefers slower flowing waters. It also has rounded seed heads which become fruits covered with bristles. The segmented leaves and the plants ability to photosynthesis underwater have been studied.

== Taxonomy ==
It was first described and published by the French naturalist and botanist Dominique Villars in his book 'Histoire des plantes du Dauphiné' Vol.3 on page 335 in 1786.

The species epithet trichophyllus is Latin for 'hairy leaves'.

In North America it is also commonly known as the 'white water crow foot'. The Icelandic name of this species is Lónasóley.

Subspecies:

- Ranunculus trichophyllus subsp. eradicatus (Laest.) C.D.K.Cook (synonym: Batrachium eradicatum (Laest.) Fr.)

== Distribution and habitat ==
The plant is found in most of the Northern Hemisphere, from the United States, Europe and the Mediterranean, east through Siberia, the Caucasus, the Middle East, the Himalayas, Kazakhstan and Mongolia to Kamchatka in Russia, also in Japan, China and Korea. It is even found in the lakes and ponds of Mount Everest.

== Phytoremediation ==
Phytoremediation is a plant-based approach, which involves the use of plants to extract and remove elemental pollutants or lower their bioavailability in soil. Ranunculus trichophyllus, commonly known as the threadleaf crowfoot or Three-leaved Crowfoot, is a species of aquatic plant. It belongs to the buttercup family (Ranunculaceae). However, it's not a widely studied or economically significant plant, and information about its specific importance might be limited. Therefore, in terms of Phytoremediation, there is limited information other than the species participates in phytofiltration. Phytofiltration is a type of phytoremediation of heavy metal-polluted soil. Phytofiltration is the use of plant roots (rhizofiltratio)), shoots (caulofiltration), or seedlings (blastofiltration) to remove pollutants from contaminated surface waters or waste waters. During rhizofiltration, heavy metals are either adsorbed onto the root surface or absorbed by the roots. Root exudates can change rhizosphere pH, which leads to the precipitation of heavy metals on plant roots, further minimizing the movement of heavy metals to underground water. Ranunculus trichophyllus is great in phytofiltration to deal with arsenic which is accumulated in aquatic plants and eliminated from water.

== Range ==
It grows in freshwater, found in dune slacks and drainage ditches to ponds, lakes, streams and slow-flowing rivers. It can be found up to 3,000 m (9,800 ft) above sea level.
