= British NVC community OV12 =

UK plant community type

British NVC community OV12 (Poa annua - Myosotis arvensis community) is one of the open habitat communities in the British National Vegetation Classification system. It is one of eight arable weed and wasteland communities of fertile loams and clays.

It is a widespread community, in which two subcommunities are recognised.

== Community composition ==
The following constant species are found in this community:

- Creeping bent (Agrostis stolonifera)
- Field forget-me-not (Myosotis arvensis)
- Annual meadow-grass (Poa annua)
- Rough meadow-grass (Poa trivialis)
- Knotgrass (Polygonum aviculare)

There are no rare species associated with the community.

== Subcommunities ==
Two subcommunities are recognised:

- the typical subcommunity
- the Dicranella staphylina - Bryum subcommunity

== Distribution ==
This community is widespread throughout Britain. It is characteristic of trampled damp pastures and recreational grasslands, particularly where horse or cattle dung is present (as these aid the distribution of Poa annua seeds).
