= British NVC community U19 =

UK plant community type

NVC community U19 (Thelypteris limbosperma - Blechnum spicant community) is one of the calcifugous grassland communities in the British National Vegetation Classification system.

It is a widespread but local community. There are no subcommunities.

== Community composition ==
The following constant species are found in this community:

- Lemon-scented fern (Thelypteris limbosperma)
- Hard fern (Blechnum spicant)
- Tormentil (Potentilla erecta)
- Heath bedstraw (Galium saxatile)
- Wood sorrel (Oxalis acetosella)

The Rare species Hymenophyllum wilsonii is known to be associated with the community.

== Distribution ==
This community is widespread but local in the uplands of Wales, England and Scotland.

== Subcommunities ==
There are no subcommunities.
