= British NVC community OV22 =

UK plant community type

British NVC community OV22 (Poa annua - Taraxacum officinale community) is one of the open habitat communities in the British National Vegetation Classification system. It is one of six communities characteristic of gateways, tracksides and courtyards.

This community occurs very widely throughout Britain.

There are three subcommunities.

== Community composition ==
The following constant species are found in this community:

- Annual meadow-grass (Poa annua)
- Dandelion (Taraxacum officinale agg.)

There are no rare species associated with the community.

== Distribution ==
This community occurs very widely throughout Britain. It is found on disturbed loamy soils, where there is only light trampling, such as alongside tracks and paths, on roadside verges, at the base of walls, and on recently turned or neglected soil in gardens, farms and waste ground.

== Subcommunities ==
There are three subcommunities:

- the Senecio vulgaris subcommunity
- the Cirsium vulgare - C. arvense subcommunity
- the Crepis vesicaria - Epilobium adenocaulon subcommunity
