= British NVC community OV10 =

UK plant community type

British NVC community OV10 (Poa annua - Senecio vulgaris community) is one of the open habitat communities in the British National Vegetation Classification system. It is one of eight arable weed and wasteland communities of fertile loams and clays.

It is a widespread community, in which four subcommunities are recognised.

== Community composition ==
The following constant species are found in this community:

- Annual meadow-grass (Poa annua)
- Groundsel (Senecio vulgaris)

There are no rare species associated with the community.

== Subcommunities ==
There are four subcommunities:

- the Polygonum persicaria - Ranunculus repens subcommunity
- the Polygonum aviculare - Matricaria perforata subcommunity
- the Agrostis stolonifera - Rumex crispus subcommunity
- the Dactylis glomerata - Agrostis capillaris subcommunity

== Distribution ==
This is characteristically a pioneer weed community. Except for the Polygonum - Ranunculus subcommunity, which is mainly confined to the south and east, it is found throughout Britain, in a variety of situations, such as arable land, gardens, recreational grasslands, waysides and gateways, and on soil heaps on construction sites.
