= British NVC community OV1 =

UK plant community type

British NVC community OV1 (Viola arvensis - Aphanes microcarpa community) is one of the open habitat communities in the British National Vegetation Classification system. It is one of six arable weed and track-side communities of light, less-fertile acid soils.

It is a widely distributed community. There are no subcommunities.

== Community composition ==
The following constant species are found in this community:

- Slender parsley-piert (Aphanes australis)
- Annual meadow-grass (Poa annua)
- Sheep's sorrel (Rumex acetosella)
- Field pansy (Viola arvensis)

Two rare species are associated with the community:

- Annual vernal-grass (Anthoxanthum aristatum)
- Lesser quaking-grass (Briza minor)

== Distribution ==
This community is typically associated with arable crops on impoverished soils and is now very scarce, both because suitable soils have a localised distribution and because intensive cereal agriculture is not conducive to its development. It is found very locally, mostly in southern and eastern Britain, most often in fields of barley or fallow arable.
