= British NVC community OV20 =

UK plant community type

British NVC community OV20 (Poa annua - Sagina procumbens community) is one of the open habitat communities in the British National Vegetation Classification system. It is one of six communities characteristic of gateways, tracksides and courtyards.

This community is widely distributed in the lowlands and upland fringes of Britain.

There are two subcommunities.

== Community composition ==
Two constant species are found in this community:

- Annual meadow-grass (Poa annua)
- Procumbent pearlwort (Sagina procumbens)

No rare species are associated with the community.

== Distribution ==
This community is widely distributed in the lowlands and upland fringes of Britain. It is found in urban and suburban habitats, occupying crevices between paving slabs and brickwork on streets and pavements, and in courtyards, and also occurs in rural areas, around farms and domestic buildings, wherever there is heavy trampling.

This is the British equivalent of the Papaveri-Sileneetum noctiflori syntaxon, first described by Diemont, Sissingh and Westhoff (1940) from the Netherlands but which is found widely throughout Europe.

== Subcommunities ==
There are two subcommunities:

- the so-called typical subcommunity
- the Lolium perenne - Chamomilla suaveolens subcommunity
