= Aquatic communities in the British National Vegetation Classification system =

UK plant community type

This article gives an overview of the aquatic communities in the British National Vegetation Classification system.

== Introduction ==
The aquatic communities of the NVC were described in Volume 4 of British Plant Communities, first published in 1995, along with the swamps and tall-herb fens.

In total, 24 aquatic communities have been identified.

The aquatic communities fall into the following six groups:

- four communities of the water surface and sub-surface, in which duckweeds and/or Frogbit are the constant species; these communities (A1, A2, A3 and A4) are found in moderately-rich to eutrophic standing waters
- eight free-floating or rooted and submerged, pondweed communities (A5, A6, A11, A12, A13, A14, A15 and A21)
- six communities in which rooted water-lilies and pondweeds with floating leaves are the constant species (A7, A8, A9, A10, A19 and A20)
- three communities in which water-crowfoots and/or starworts are the constant species (A16, A17 and A18)
- two hairgrass and quillwort communities (A22 and A23)
- a single community characterised by free-floating vegetation found in impoverished base-poor standing waters (A24).

== List of aquatic communities ==
The following is a list of the communities that make up this category:

- A1 Lemna gibba community Lemnetum gibbae Miyawaki & J. Tx. 1960
- A2 Lemna minor community Lemnetum minoris Soó 1947
- A3 Spirodela polyrhiza - Hydrocharis morsus-ranae community
- A4 Hydrocharis morsus-ranae - Stratiotes aloides community
- A5 Ceratophyllum demersum community Certaophylletum demersi Hild 1956
- A6 Ceratophyllum submersum community Certaophylletum submersi Den Hartog & Segal 1964
- A7 Nymphaea alba community Nymphaeetum albae Oberdorfer & Mitarb. 1967
- A8 Nuphar lutea community
- A9 Potamogeton natans community
- A10 Polygonum amphibium community
- A11 Potamogeton pectinatus - Myriophyllum spicatum community
- A12 Potamogeton pectinatus community
- A13 Potamogeton perfoliatus - Myriophyllum alterniflorum community
- A14 Myriophyllum alterniflorum community Myriophylletum alterniflori
- A15 Elodea canadensis community
- A16 Callitriche stagnalis community
- A17 Ranunculus penicillatus ssp. pseudofluitans community
- A18 Ranunculus fluitans community Ranunculetum fluitantis Allorge 1922
- A19 Ranunculus aquatilis community Ranunculetum aquatilis Géhu 1961
- A20 Ranunculus peltatus community Ranunculetum peltati Sauer 1947
- A21 Ranunculus baudotii community Ranunculetum baudotii Br.-Bl. 1952
- A22 Littorella uniflora - Lobelia dortmanna community
- A23 Isoetes lacustris/setacea community
- A24 Juncus bulbosus community.
