= British NVC community SD3 =

UK plant community type

NVC community SD3 (Matricaria maritima - Galium aparine strandline community) is one of two strandline community in the British National Vegetation Classification system.

It is a fairly localised community of northern Britain. There are no subcommunities.

== Community composition ==
Two constant species, Cleavers (Galium aparine) and Sea Mayweed (Matricaria maritima), are found in this community.

Two rare species, Oysterplant (Mertensia maritima) and Ray's Knotgrass (Polygonum oxyspermum ssp. raii), are also associated with the community.

== Distribution ==
This community is found in many localities in Scotland, principally on the west coast, and on the northwest coast of England.
