= British NVC community OV41 =

UK plant community type

British NVC community OV41 (Parietaria diffusa community) is one of the open habitat communities in the British National Vegetation Classification system. It is one of six communities of crevice, scree and spoil vegetation.

This community is widely distributed in suitable habitats in the southern lowlands of Britain.

There are two subcommunities.

== Community composition ==
One constant species is found in this community:

- Pellitory-of-the-wall (Parietaria judaica)

Three rare species are associated with the community:

- Wild cabbage (Brassica oleracea)
- Yellow whitlowgrass (Draba aizoides)
- Nottingham catchfly (Silene nutans)

== Distribution ==
This community is widely distributed in suitable habitats in the southern lowlands of Britain, mainly in south-east England. It is found on sunny ledges and in crevices on limestone quarry rock faces and cliffs and mortared walls; the Daucus carota subcommunity, which is restricted to coastal locations, is found as far west as south Wales.

It is essentially the same as the Parietarietum judaicae assemblage recognised in other parts of Europe.

== Subcommunities ==
There are two subcommunities:

- the Homalothecium sericeum - Tortula muralis subcommunity
- the Daucus carota subcommunity
