= Vegetation of open habitats in the British National Vegetation Classification system =

UK plant community type

This article gives an overview of the plant communities formed by vegetation of open habitats in the British National Vegetation Classification system.

== Introduction ==
The open habitat communities of the NVC were described in Volume 5 of British Plant Communities, first published in 2000, along with the three groups of maritime communities (shingle, strandline and sand-dune communities, salt-marsh communities and maritime cliff communities).

In total, 42 open habitat communities have been identified.

The open habitat communities consist of eight distinct subgroups:

- six arable weed and trackside communities of light, less-fertile acid soils (OV1, OV2, OV3, OV4, OV5 and OV6)
- eight arable weed and wasteland communities of fertile loams and clays (OV7, OV8, OV9, OV10, OV11, OV12, OV13 and OV14)
- three arable weed communities of light, limey soils (OV15, OV16 and OV17)
- six gateway, trackside and courtyard communities (OV18, OV19, OV20, OV21, OV22 and OV23)
- four tall-herb weed communities (OV24, OV25, OV26 and OV27)
- five communities typical of periodically inundated habitats (OV28, OV29, OV30, OV32 and OV33)
- four dwarf-rush communities of ephemeral ponds (OV31, OV34, OV35 and OV36)
- six communities of crevice, scree and spoil vegetation (OV37, OV38, OV39, OV40, OV41 and OV42)

== List of open habitat communities ==
The following is a list of the communities that make up this category:

- OV1 Viola arvensis - Aphanes microcarpa community
- OV2 Briza minor - Silene gallica community
- OV3 Papaver rhoeas - Viola arvensis community
- OV4 Chrysanthemum segetum - Spergula arvensis community
- OV5 Digitaria ischaemum - Erodium cicutarium community
- OV6 Cerastium glomeratum - Fumaria muralis ssp. boraei community
- OV7 Veronica persica - Veronica polita community
- OV8 Veronica persica - Alopecurus myosuroides community
- OV9 Matricaria perforata - Stellaria media community
- OV10 Poa annua - Senecio vulgaris community
- OV11 Poa annua - Stachys arvensis community
- OV12 Poa annua - Myosotis arvensis community
- OV13 Stellaria media - Capsella bursa-pastoris community
- OV14 Urtica urens - Lamium amplexicaule community
- OV15 Anagallis arvensis - Veronica persica community
- OV16 Papaver rhoeas - Silene noctiflora community
- OV17 Reseda lutea - Polygonum aviculare community
- OV18 Polygonum aviculare - Chamomilla suavolens community
- OV19 Poa annua - Matricaria perforata community
- OV20 Poa annua - Sagina procumbens community
- OV21 Poa annua - Plantago major community
- OV22 Poa annua - Taraxacum officinale community
- OV23 Lolium perenne - Dactylis glomerata community
- OV24 Urtica dioica - Galium aparine community
- OV25 Urtica dioica - Cirsium arvense community
- OV26 Epilobium hirsutum community
- OV27 Epilobium angustifolium community
- OV28 Agrostis stolonifera - Ranunculus repens community
- OV29 Alopecurus geniculatus - Rorippa palustris community
- OV30 Bidens tripartita - Polygonum amphibium community
- OV31 Rorippa palustris - Filaginella uliginosa community
- OV32 Myosotis scorpioides - Ranunculus sceleratus community
- OV33 Polygonum lapathifolium - Poa annua community
- OV34 Allium schoenoprasum - Plantago maritima community
- OV35 Lythrum portula - Ranunculus flammula community
- OV36 Lythrum hyssopifolia - Juncus bufonius community
- OV37 Festuca ovina - Minuartia verna community
- OV38 Gymnocarpium robertianum - Arrhenatherum elatius community
- OV39 Asplenium trichomanes - Asplenium ruta-muraria community
- OV40 Asplenium viride - Cystopteris fragilis community
- OV41 Parietaria diffusa community
- OV42 Cymbalaria muralis community
