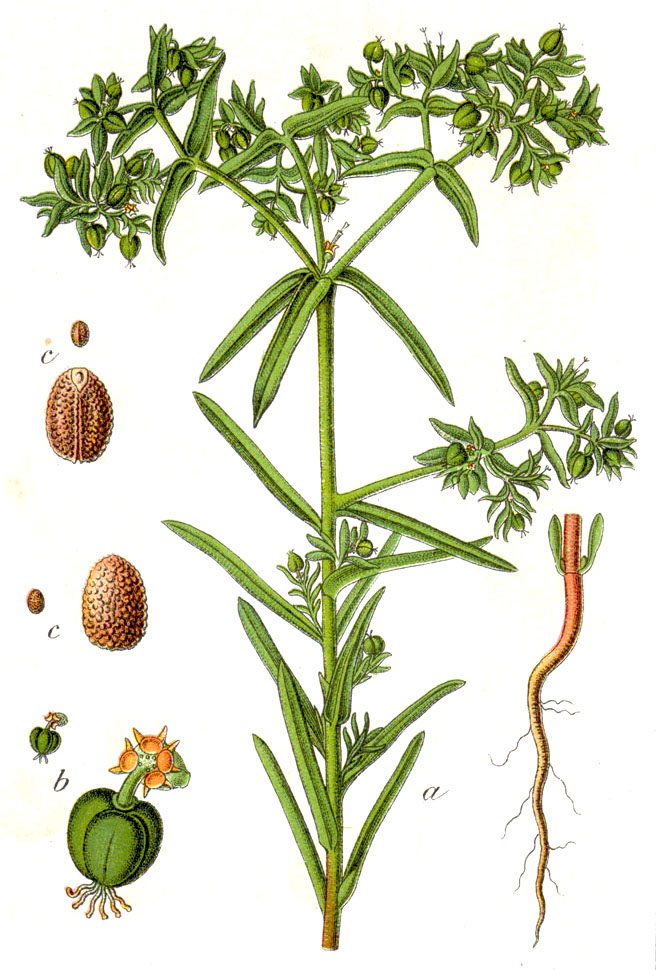
- Botanical illustration

Scientific classification
- Kingdom: Plantae
- Clade: Embryophytes
- Clade: Tracheophytes
- Clade: Spermatophytes
- Clade: Angiosperms
- Clade: Eudicots
- Clade: Rosids
- Order: Malpighiales
- Family: Euphorbiaceae
- Genus: Euphorbia
- Species: E. exigua

Binomial name
- Euphorbia exigua L.

Synonyms
- Esula diffusa (Jacq.) Haw.; Esula exigua (L.) Haw.; Esula tricuspidata (Lapeyr.) Fourr.; Euphorbia cuneiformis Burm.f.; Euphorbia diffusa Jacq.; Euphorbia melillensis Sennen & Mauricio (nom. illeg.); Euphorbia pycnophylla (K.U.Kramer & Westra) C.Brullo & Brullo (nom. illeg.); Euphorbia retusa (L.) Cav. (nom. illeg.); Euphorbia tricuspidata Lapeyr.; Keraselma exiguum (L.) Raf.; Keraselma retusum (L.) Raf.; Nisomenes diffusa (Jacq.) Raf.; Tithymalus exiguus (L.) Hill

= Euphorbia exigua =

Species of flowering plant

Euphorbia exigua, dwarf spurge or small spurge, is a species of Euphorbia in the spurge family (Euphorbiaceae), native to Europe, northern Africa and the Near East, and invasive worldwide.

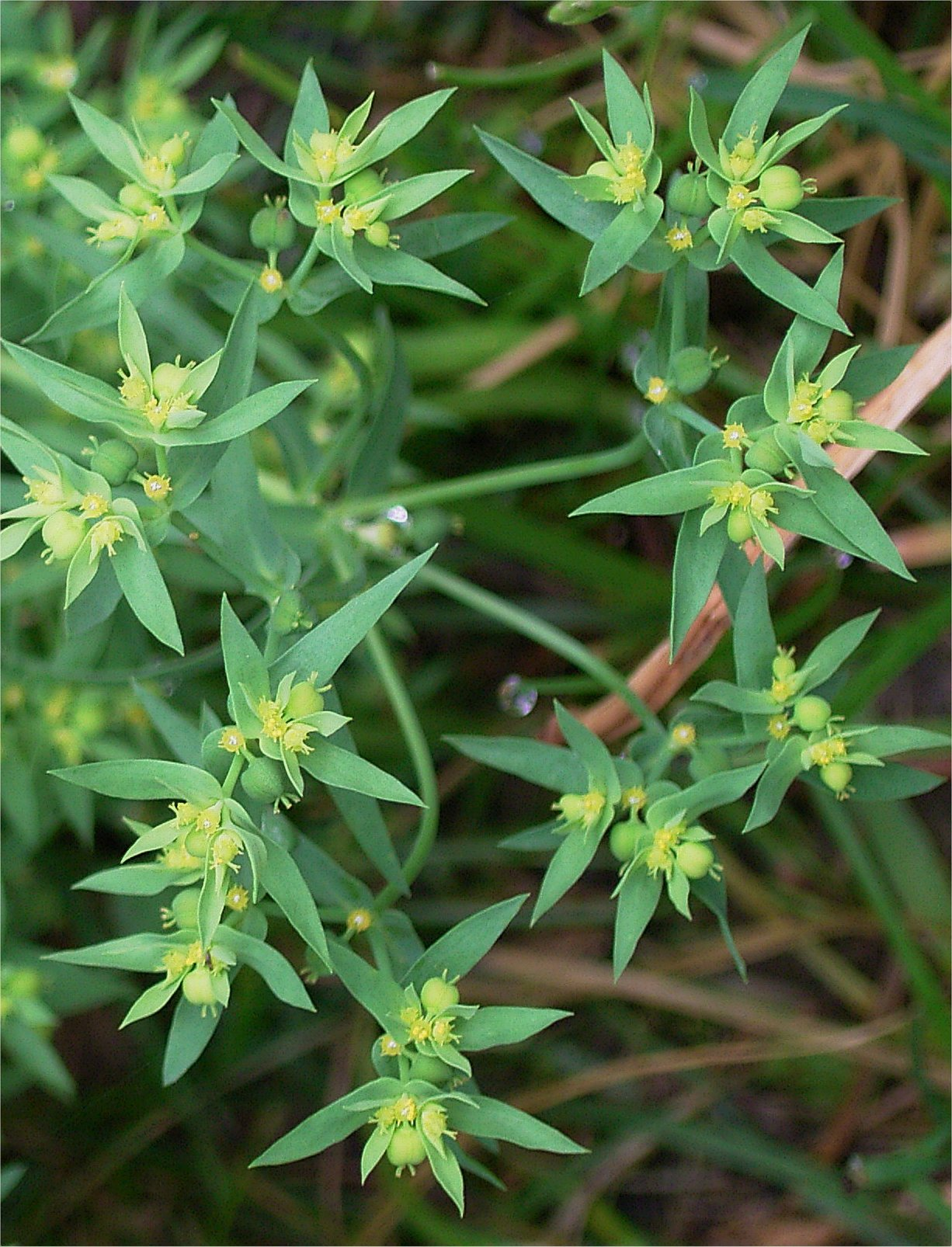
View of flowers
