= John S. Rodwell =

University of Lancaster ecologist

John Stanley Rodwell
- Education: University of Leeds
- Alma mater: University of Southampton
- Known for: British National Vegetation Classification
- Awards: IEEM medal, 2009
- Scientific career
- Fields: Ecology
- Workplaces: University of Lancaster (1991–2004)
- Thesis: (1974)
- Doctoral advisor: Joyce Lambert

John S. Rodwell (1946 – present) is an ecologist who was based at the University of Lancaster, noted for his role in the development of the British National Vegetation Classification and as editor of the five volumes of British Plant Communities.

== Education ==
Rodwell graduated in Botany from the University of Leeds in 1968, then researched limestone vegetation at the University of Southampton under Joyce Lambert for his PhD in Biology, awarded in 1974. He also trained for the priesthood at Ripon College Cuddesdon, University of Oxford, maintaining this vocation as a non-stipendiary priest since 1974 in the Diocese of Blackburn since 1975 and is honorary canon of Blackburn Cathedral.

== Career ==
In the same year, 1975, he became co-ordinator of research leading to the development of the British National Vegetation Classification (NVC). at Lancaster University, becoming editor of the NVC, a task that dominated his working life for more than two decades. All five volumes of British Plant Communities, which describe the NVC, were edited by Rodwell.

He joined the faculty of Lancaster University in 1991, was made Professor of Ecology in 1997 and retired in 2004 but has continued to teach and publish since then. In 2009 he was awarded the Institute of Ecology and Environmental Management medal of honour.

He is an Honorary Member of the International Association for Vegetation Science (2010).
