= British NVC community MG12 =

UK plant community type

British NVC community MG12 (Festuca arundinacea grassland) is one of the mesotrophic grassland communities in the British National Vegetation Classification system. It is one of three types of mesotrophic grassland classified as grass-dominated inundation communities.

It is a fairly localised coastal community. There are two subcommunities.

== Community composition ==
The following constant species are found in this community:

- Creeping Bent (Agrostis stolonifera)
- Tall Fescue (Festuca arundinacea)
- Red Fescue (Festuca rubra)

No rare species are associated with this community.

== Distribution ==
This community is exclusively coastal; it is mainly found on the south coast and western coasts of Britain, with an outlying site on the coast of Yorkshire.

== Subcommunities ==
There are two subcommunities:

- the Lolium perenne - Holcus lanatus subcommunity
- the Oenanthe lachenalii subcommunity
