= British NVC community OV13 =

UK plant community type

British NVC community OV13 (Stellaria media — Capsella bursa-pastoris community) is one of the open habitat communities in the British National Vegetation Classification system. It is one of eight arable weed and wasteland communities of fertile loams and clays.

It is a widespread community, in which four subcommunities are recognised.

== Community composition ==
The following constant species are found in this community:

- Shepherd's-purse (Capsella bursa-pastoris)
- Fat-hen (Chenopodium album)
- Knotgrass (Polygonum aviculare)
- Groundsel (Senecio vulgaris)
- Common chickweed (Stellaria media)

There is one rare species associated with the community:

- Tall ramping-fumitory (Fumaria bastardii)

== Subcommunities ==
Four subcommunities are recognised:

- the typical subcommunity
- the Matricaria perforata — Poa annua subcommunity
- the Fumaria officinalis — Euphorbia helioscopia subcommunity
- the Urtica dioica — Galium aparine subcommunity

== Distribution ==
This community is widespread throughout lowland Britain. It is commonly found as a weed vegetation among root and vegetable crops, but is also found among cereal crops and on disturbed ground. Because many of the constituent species are tolerant of commonly used herbicides, it is one of the commonest weed assemblages in intensively farms and market gardens.
