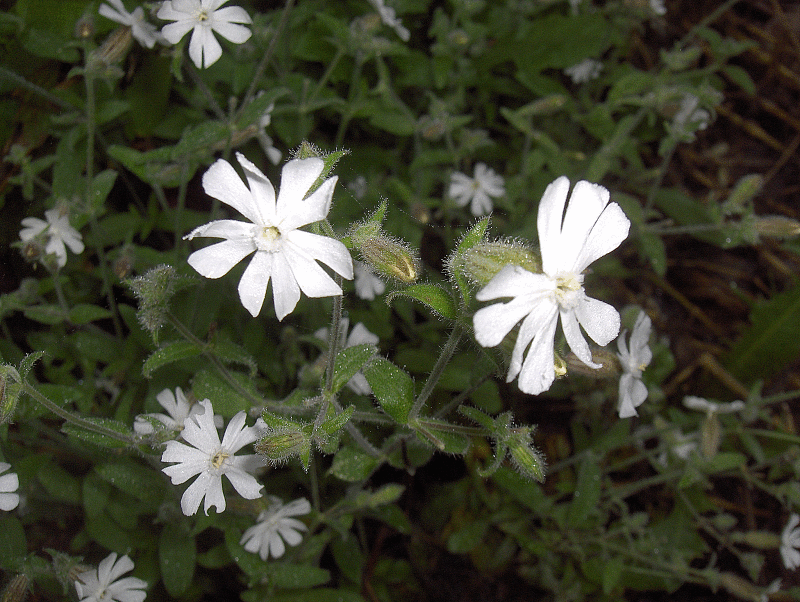

Scientific classification
- Kingdom: Plantae
- Clade: Tracheophytes
- Clade: Angiosperms
- Clade: Eudicots
- Order: Caryophyllales
- Family: Caryophyllaceae
- Genus: Silene
- Species: S. noctiflora

Binomial name
- Silene noctiflora L.

= Silene noctiflora =

Species of flowering plant

Silene noctiflora is a species of flowering plant in the family Caryophyllaceae known by the common names night-flowering catchfly, nightflowering silene and clammy cockle. It is native to Eurasia, but it is known on other continents as an introduced species and sometimes a weed. In North America, it is a common weed of grain crops in the Canadian prairie provinces and in much of the United States. It grows in fields and in other disturbed habitat.

== Description ==
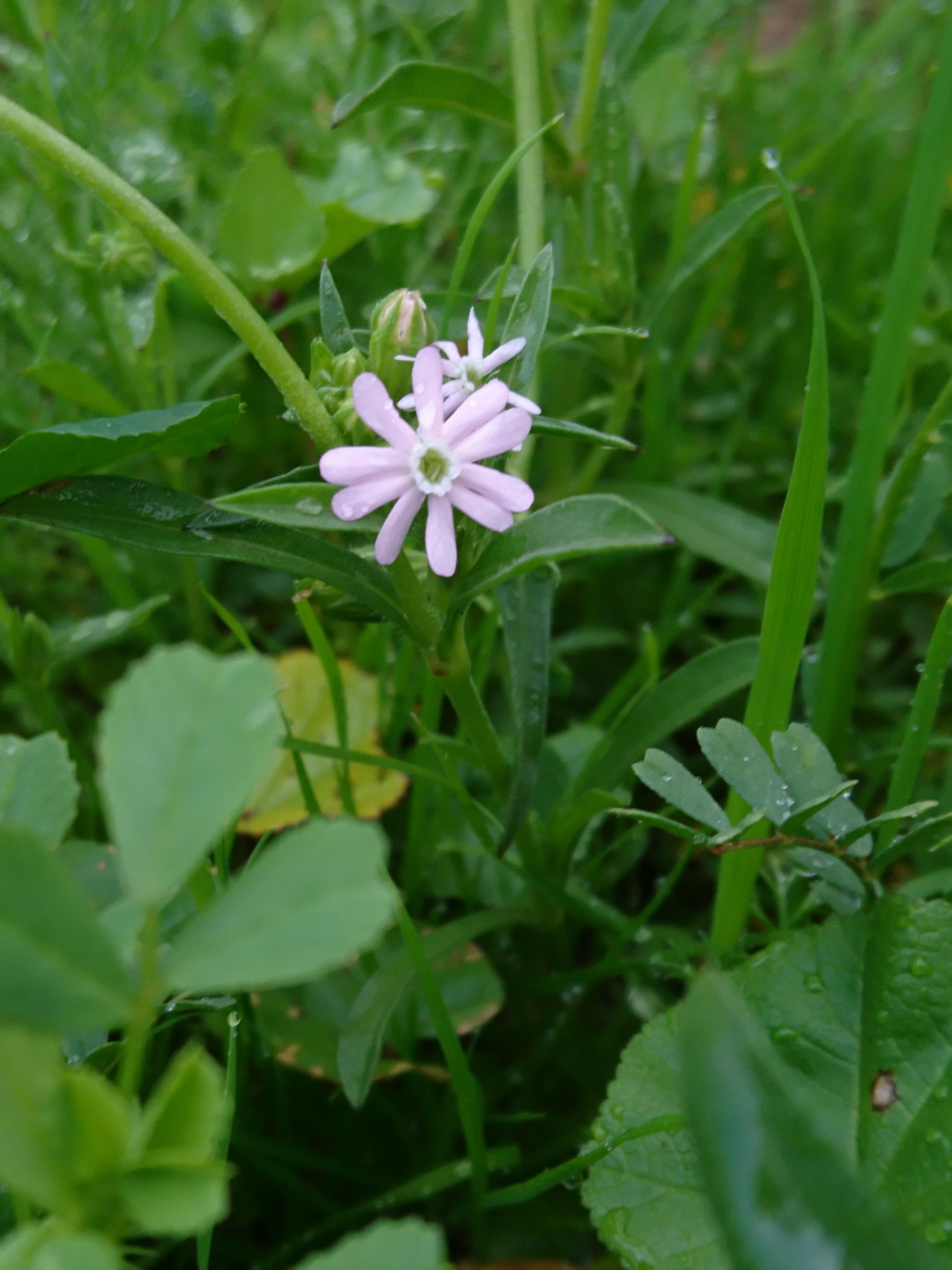
Wild Night-Flowering Catchfly in Behbahan

The night-flowering catchfly is an annual herb producing a hairy, glandular stem up to about 75 or 80 centimeters in maximum height. It is sticky in texture. The hairy, widely lance-shaped leaves grow in opposite pairs and are up to 14 centimeters long and 5 wide, the largest ones located low on the stem. The flowers are nocturnal, and occur in an open cyme of up to fifteen blooms, each borne on an erect pedicel. The flower is encapsulated in a hairy calyx of fused sepals lined with a netlike pattern of veining. The five petals are white to pink and each has two lobes at the tip. They measure up to 2.5 centimeters wide when fully open. The fruit is a yellowish-brown capsule with six chambers which splits open to release the seeds.

== Ecology ==
As night falls the flowers of the night-flowering catchfly open and release a strong fragrance which attracts night-flying moths which feed on the copious nectar and pollinate the plant.

== Research ==
Besides being a competitive weed, the night-flowering catchfly is host to some plant pathogens that can spread to crop plants, including tobacco streak virus and Lychnis ringspot virus.

The mitochondrial genome of this species has been sequenced. It is 6.7 megabases long, which is very large compared to some other Silene species such as Silene vulgaris (0.43 megabases), is one of the largest sequenced plant mitochondrial genomes (the largest is Silene conica at 11.3 megabases), and consists of 59 small chromosomes.
