= British NVC community OV39 =

UK plant community type

British NVC community OV39 (Asplenium trichomanes - Asplenium ruta-muraria community) is one of the open habitat communities in the British National Vegetation Classification system. It is one of six communities of crevice, scree and spoil vegetation.

This community is widely distributed in areas of suitable habitat, especially in the west of Britain.

There are two subcommunities.

== Community composition ==
Four constant species are found in this community:

- Wall-rue (Asplenium ruta-muraria)
- Maidenhair spleenwort (Asplenium trichomanes)
- Silky wall feather-moss (Homalothecium sericeum)
- Wall scalewort (Porella platyphylla)

Two rare species are associated with the community:

- Hutchinsia (Hornungia petraea)
- Nottingham catchfly (Silene nutans)

== Distribution ==
This community require a lime-rich substrate and its natural habitat is crevices in limestone bedrock, especially in western Britain, where the more humid conditions are favourable to the weathering of suitable rocks. Elsewhere it is also found widely on artificial substrates, such as on buildings and walls built using limestone and on walls dressed with lime mortar.

== Subcommunities ==
There are two subcommunities:

- the Trichostomum crispulum - Tortula intermedia subcommunity
- the Sedum acre - Arenaria serpyllifolia subcommunity

The Trichostomum crispulum - Tortula intermedia subcommunity is dominated by ferns and bryophytes, and flowering plants are scarce.

The Sedum acre - Arenaria serpyllifolia subcommunity typically contains many more vascular plants, with sheep's fescue (Festuca ovina), wild thyme (Thymus praecox) and biting stonecrop (Sedum acre) the most frequent.
