= British Plant Communities =

Classification system

British Plant Communities Volume 1

British Plant Communities is a five-volume work, edited by John S. Rodwell and published by Cambridge University Press, which describes the plant communities which comprise the British National Vegetation Classification.

Its coverage includes all native vegetation communities and some artificial ones of Great Britain, excluding Northern Ireland. The series is a major contribution to plant conservation in Great Britain, and, as such, covers material appropriate for professionals and amateurs interested in the conservation of native plant communities. Each book begins with an introduction to the techniques used to survey the particular vegetations within its scope, discussing sampling, the type of data collected, organization of the data, and analysing the data. Each community is discussed with an overall emphasis of the ecology of the community, so that users can consider the relationships of various plant communities to each other as a function of climatic or soil conditions, for example.

The five volumes are:

- British Plant Communities Volume 1 – Woodlands and Scrub

This volume was first published in 1991 in hardback (ISBN 0-521-23558-8) and in 1998 in paperback (ISBN 0-521-62721-4)

- British Plant Communities Volume 2 – Mires and Heaths

This volume was first published in 1991 in hardback (ISBN 0-521-39165-2) and in 1998 in paperback (ISBN 0-521-62720-6)

- British Plant Communities Volume 3 – Grasslands and Montane Communities

This volume was first published in 1992 in hardback (ISBN 0-521-39166-0) and in 1998 in paperback (ISBN 0-521-62719-2)

- British Plant Communities Volume 4 – Aquatic Communities, Swamps and Tall-herb Fens

This volume was first published in 1995 in hardback (ISBN 0-521-39168-7) and in 1998 in paperback (ISBN 0-521-62718-4)

- British Plant Communities Volume 5 – Maritime Communities and Vegetation of Open Habitats

This volume was first published in 2000 in both hardback (ISBN 0-521-39167-9) and paperback (ISBN 0-521-64476-3)

== Errors ==
The following is a list of errors found in the published books:

- In Volume 1, on page 38–39, the branches leading from couplets 22 and 23 should read W12, not W14
- In volume 3, on page 117, the first branch in couplet 3 should lead to couplet 4, to enable the subcommunities of CG3 to be discerned
- In volume 3, page 284, the Juncus trifidus – Racomitrium lanuginosum community is referred to as community U11, whereas it is in fact community U9.
- In volume 4, page 19, the "free-floating or rooted and submerged pondweed vegetation" group of aquatic communities is listed as having seven constituent communities, when in fact it has eight.
- In volume 5, page 20, the "middle saltmarsh" grouping is listed as having eight constituent communities, when in fact it has nine.
- In volume 5, pages 142–143, there is a discrepancy between the stated distribution of community SD3 ("confined to Scotland") and the mapped distribution, which shows the community also occurring in Lancashire and Cumbria.
- In volume 5, page 482, Sedum anglicum is listed as a constituent species of community OV33; however, it is not present in the floristic table for this community on page 437
