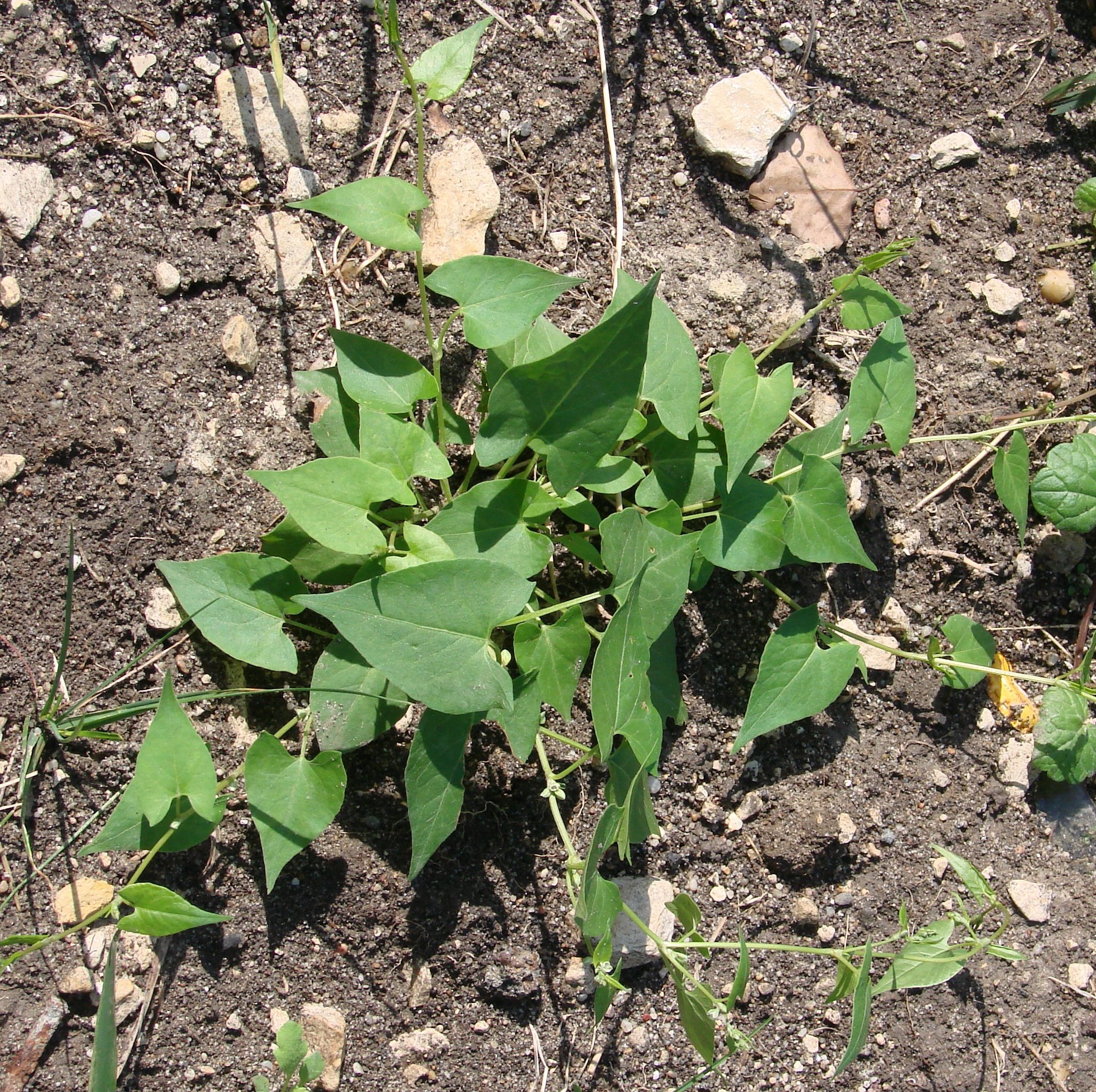

Scientific classification
- Kingdom: Plantae
- Clade: Tracheophytes
- Clade: Angiosperms
- Clade: Eudicots
- Order: Caryophyllales
- Family: Polygonaceae
- Genus: Fallopia
- Species: F. convolvulus

Binomial name
- Fallopia convolvulus (L.) Á.Löve

Synonyms
- List: Bilderdykia convolvulus (L.) Dumort.; Bilderdykia convolvulus var. pumilio Lunell; Fagopyrum carinatum Moench; Fagopyrum convolvulus (L.) Gross; Fagopyrum volubile Gilib.; Fallopia convolvulus var. subalatum (Lej. & Courtois) D.H.Kent; Helxine convolvulus (L.) Raf.; Polygonum bertolonii Goiran & Tonini; Polygonum convolvulaceum Lam.; Polygonum convolvuliforme St.-Lag.; Polygonum convolvulus L.; Polygonum convolvulus var. bertolonii (Goiran & Tonini) Fiori; Polygonum convolvulus var. cristatum Kuntze; Polygonum convolvulus var. erectum Farw.; Polygonum convolvulus f. filiformis Bolzon; Polygonum convolvulus f. glabrum Kuntze; Polygonum convolvulus var. heterophyllum Merino; Polygonum convolvulus f. puberulum Kuntze; Polygonum convolvulus f. pubescens Kuntze; Polygonum convolvulus var. subalatum Lej. & Courtois; Polygonum infestum Salisb.; Polygonum striatum Dulac; Reynoutria convolvulus (L.) Shinners; Tiniaria carinata Montandon; Tiniaria convolvulus (L.) Webb & Moq.

= Fallopia convolvulus =

Plant species in the buckwheat family

Fallopia convolvulus, the black-bindweed or wild buckwheat, is a fast-growing annual flowering plant in the family Polygonaceae native throughout Europe, Asia and northern Africa.

Other old folk names include bear-bind, bind-corn, climbing bindweed, climbing buckwheat, corn-bind, corn bindweed, devil's tether, and wild buckwheat.

== Description ==
Black-bindweed is a herbaceous vine growing to 1–1.5 m (39–59 in) long, with stems that twine clockwise round other plant stems. The alternate triangular leaves are 1.5–6 cm long and 0.7–3 cm broad with a 6–15 (–50) mm petiole; the basal lobes of the leaves are pointed at the petiole. The flowers are small, and greenish-pink to greenish white, clustered on short racemes. These clusters give way to small triangular achenes, with one seed in each achene. The flowers have 5 sepals, the 3 outer ones are larger and show a keel. It has 5 stamens and the fruit grows to 4 mm long.

While it superficially resemble bindweeds in the genus Convolvulus there are many notable differences; it has ocrea (stipule-sheath at nodes), which Convolvulus does not; and Convolvulus has conspicuous trumpet-shaped flowers while Black-bindweed has flowers that are unobtrusive and only about 4 mm long.

== Taxonomy ==
One of the species named by Carl Linnaeus in the Polygonum genus in 1753 was Polygonum convolvulus. It has been moved many times since then, but in 1970 it was placed in Fallopia by Áskell Löve. Although Fallopia convolvulus is the accepted name according to Plants of the World Online, World Plants, and the Flora of North America, it is listed in sources such as the USDA Natural Resources Conservation Service plants database as Polygonum convolvulus. Along with its genus it is part of the Polygonaceae family. Fallopia convolvulus has 25 synonyms, including eight homotypic synonyms.

Table of homotypic synonyms
Name	Year	Notes
Bilderdykia convolvulus (L.) Dumort.	1827	
Fagopyrum carinatum Moench	1794	nom. illeg.
Fagopyrum convolvulus (L.) Gross	1913	
Helxine convolvulus (L.) Raf.	1837	
Polygonum convolvulus L.	1753	
Polygonum infestum Salisb.	1796	nom. illeg. superfl.
Reynoutria convolvulus (L.) Shinners	1967	
Tiniaria convolvulus (L.) Webb & Moq.	1846	

=== Names ===
Fallopia convolvulus is known by the common names black bindweed and Eurasian black bindweed, although it is not true bindweed of the genus Convolvulus. It is also sometimes known as climbing buckwheat, corn bindweed, cornbind, and wild buckwheat.

== Distribution and habitat ==
Fallopia convolvulus grows most commonly on disturbed or cultivated land, in northern Europe typically on warm, sunny, well-drained sandy or limestone soil types, but in hotter, drier areas like Pakistan, on moist shady sites. It ranges from sea level in the north of its range, up to 3,600 m (11,800 ft) altitude in the south in the Himalaya.

== Cultivation and uses ==
The seeds are edible, and were used in the past as a food crop, with remains found in Bronze Age middens. The seeds are too small and low-yielding to make a commercial crop, and it is now more widely considered a weed, occurring in crops, waste areas and roadsides. It can be a damaging weed when it is growing in a garden or crop, as it can not only damage the plants around which it twines, but also clog the machinery used to harvest a given crop. It is also an invasive species in North America.
