= British National Vegetation Classification =

Descriptions for UK land plant assemblages

The British National Vegetation Classification or NVC is a system of classifying natural habitat types in Great Britain according to the vegetation they contain.

== Background ==
A large scientific meeting of ecologists, botanists, and other related professionals in the United Kingdom resulted in the publication of a compendium of five books: British Plant Communities, edited by John S. Rodwell, which detail the incidence of plant species in twelve major habitat types in the British natural environment. They are the first systematic and comprehensive account of the vegetation types of the country. They cover all natural, semi-natural and major artificial habitats in Great Britain (not Northern Ireland) and represent fifteen years of research by leading plant ecologists.

From the data collated from the books, commercial software products have been developed to help to classify vegetation identified into one of the many habitat types found in Great Britain – these include MATCH, TABLEFIT and MAVIS.

== Terminology ==
The following are lists of terms used in connection with the British National Vegetation Classification, together with their meanings.

=== Communities, subcommunities and variants ===
- A community is the fundamental unit of categorisation for vegetation.
- A subcommunity is a distinct recognisable subdivision of a community.
- A variant is a further subdivision of a subcommunity.

=== Constant species ===
- A constant species in a community is a species that is always present in any given stand of vegetation belonging to that community.

For a list of the constant species, and the NVC communities in which they are present, see List of constant species in the British National Vegetation Classification.

=== Rare species ===
- A rare species is a species which is associated with a particular community and is rare nationally.

The sources used by the authors of British Plant Communities for assessing rarity were as follows.
a) for vascular plants, two sources were used:

- Perring, F. H. and S. M. Walters (1962) Atlas of the British Flora – a species was regarded as rare if it was given an "A" rating in this work (these were plants which Perring & Walters judged to be sufficiently rare to merit a special search in order to ensure all records were included in the atlas).
- Any species included on lists compiled by the Nature Conservancy Council of plants found in less than 100 hectads.

b) for bryophytes, the source used was Corley, M. F. V. and M. O. Hill (1981) Distribution of bryophytes in the British Isles. This lists the species and the vice-counties in which they are recorded; presence in under 20 vice-counties was the criterion used for selection as rare.

c) for lichens, no source was available, and the authors used their own selection of species.

For a list of these rare species, and the NVC communities in which they are present, see List of rare species in the British National Vegetation Classification.

== Communities by category ==
In total there are 286 communities in the British National Vegetation Classification. They are grouped into the following major categories:

- Woodland and scrub communities (25 communities, prefixed with the letter "W" — 19 classed as woodland, four as scrub and two as 'underscrub')
- Mires (38 communities, prefixed "M")
- Heaths (22 communities, prefixed "H")
- Mesotrophic grasslands (13 communities, prefixed "MG")
- Calcicolous grasslands (14 communities, prefixed "CG")
- Calcifugous grasslands and montane communities (21 communities, prefixed "U")
- Aquatic communities (24 communities, prefixed "A")
- Swamps and tall-herb fens (28 communities, prefixed "S")
- Salt-marsh communities (28 communities, prefixed "SM")
- Shingle, strandline and sand-dune communities (19 communities, prefixed "SD" — one shingle, two strandline and 16 sand-dune communities)
- Maritime cliff communities (12 communities, prefixed "MC")
- Vegetation of open habitats (42 communities, prefixed "OV")

A full list of these communities, grouped into the above categories, can be found at List of plant communities in the British National Vegetation Classification.

== See also ==
- U.S. National Vegetation Classification
