= British NVC community W6 =

Vegetation community in the United Kingdom

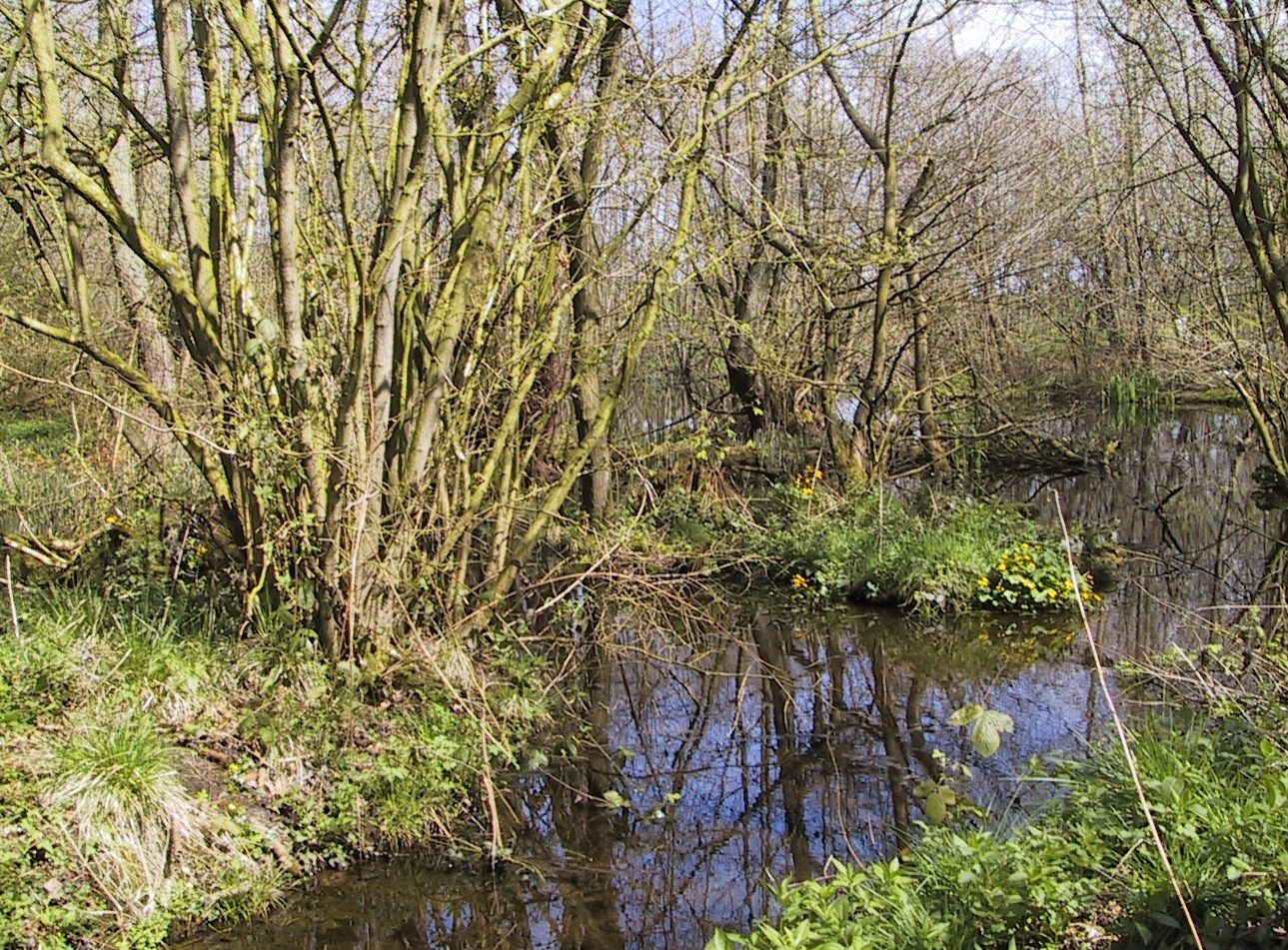
Alnus glutinosa woodland at Wollerton, Shropshire, in early spring

NVC community W6 is one of the woodland communities in the British National Vegetation Classification system, characterised by a canopy of willow and alder with a field layer of tall herbs on an enriched alluvial soil. It can be a form of primary woodland in lowland river floodplains, and is one of seven woodland communities in the NVC classed as wet woodlands. It was once very common but is now generally scarce and fragmented.

== Description ==
W6 Alnus glutinosa-Urtica dioica woodland is a broad term to cover several types of wet woodland, wherever they occur on nutrient-rich soils. It is most typical of the floodplains of lowland rivers, but can also be found on partly-drained peatlands, including both fens (which are calcareous) and mires (acid). It is found throughout the lowlands of England, Wales and southern Scotland. The characteristic (constant) tree species are alder and various species of willow. If black poplar is a native tree in Britain, this would be the habitat in which it grows, but it is not apparent that there are any truly wild populations, as there are very few female trees and no signs of regeneration, even in East Anglia where it has been claimed as a native. Other species of poplar, especially hybrid black poplars are sometimes cultivated in river floodplains, and these plantations are also a type of W6 woodland.

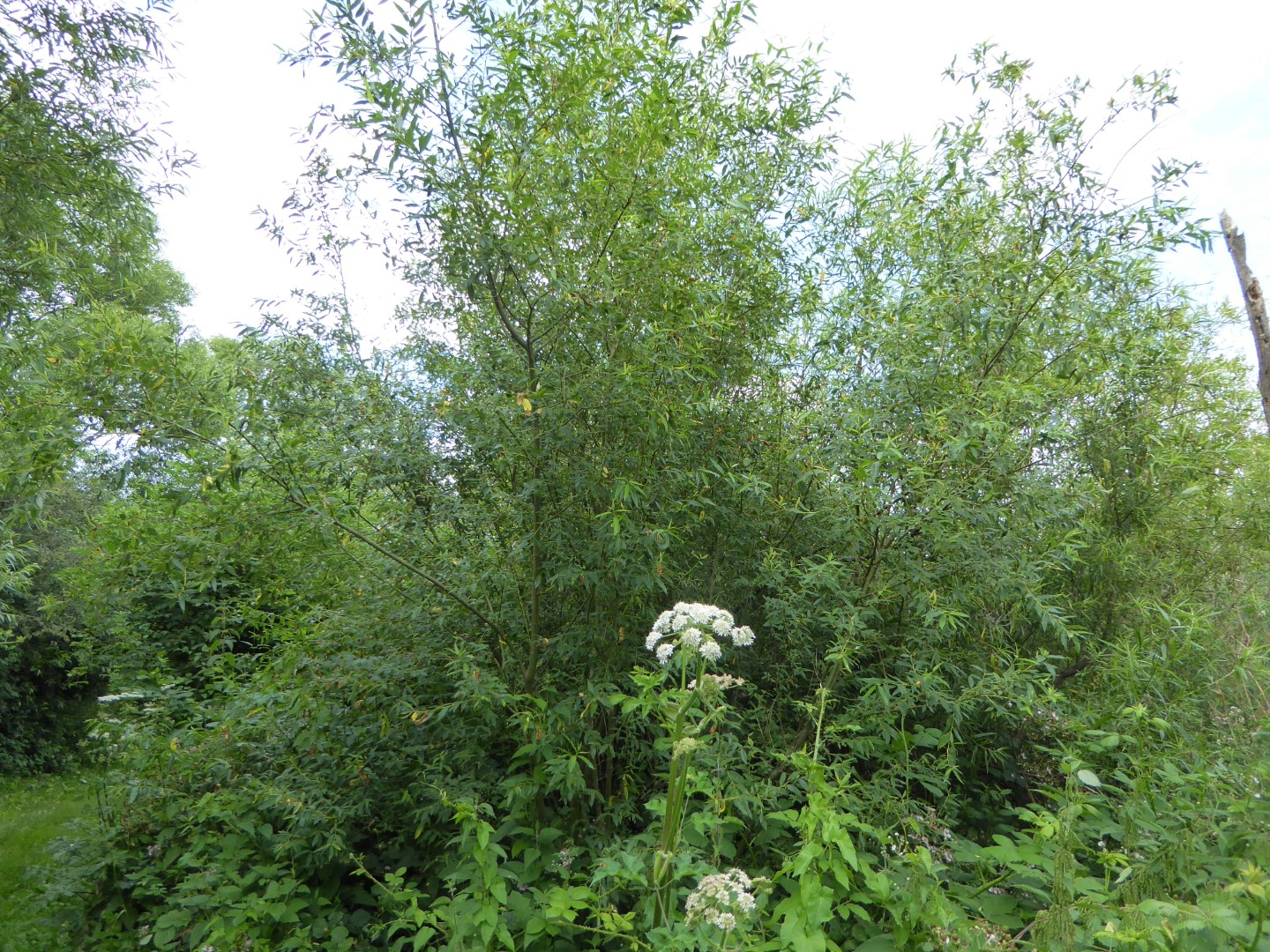
W6c Willow scrub with Salix ^{x}mollissima beside the Lampen Stream in Kent

The habitat is generally a seasonally-flooded landscape in which trees can only become established if they are tolerant of waterlogging (mainly alder and willow) or have a dry foothold. On more infrequently inundated riverbanks, shrubs like elder, osier and almond willow grow on the disturbed and eutrophic soil. In early spring a W6 woodland can have a rich ground flora, with plants such as marsh marigold, large bitter-cress and hemlock water-dropwort. Moschatel can be a particularly characteristic component. Loddon lily is considered a rare native species of this type of woodland, although it is now also widely grown in gardens. The species-richness of the spring is replaced in summer with a notably poor flora of competitive plants such as common nettle, cleavers and rough meadow-grass. In many woods, non-native species such as Himalayan balsam and Japanese knotweed flourish because of the deposition of fertile river sediment each winter.

== Subcommunities ==
There are five subcommunities:

- W6a typical subcommunity is the alder-dominated woodland that forms on old peatlands (fens or bogs) following drainage and/or the influx of nutrient-rich surface water, usually due to runoff from farmland. It is usually a type of secondary woodland and is not at all typical of W6, but it was the community that was used as the basis of W6, based on studies at Woodwalton Fen in Cambridgeshire. W6a woodlands are typically rather dry, with trees such as sycamore and oak amongst the alders, and with a very poor ground flora of eutrophic herbs.
- W6b Salix x fragilis subcommunity is the classic river floodplain woodland, with large trees such as crack willow and white willow, and potentially some black poplar. The ground flora often contains typical riverbank plants such as great willowherb and reed canary-grass.
- W6c Salix viminalis/S. triandra subcommunity occurs on river eyots and terraces which were once widely planted up as osier beds to provide whips for basketmaking. Some old stands still contain rare varieties, but more natural stands of these species are now widespread.

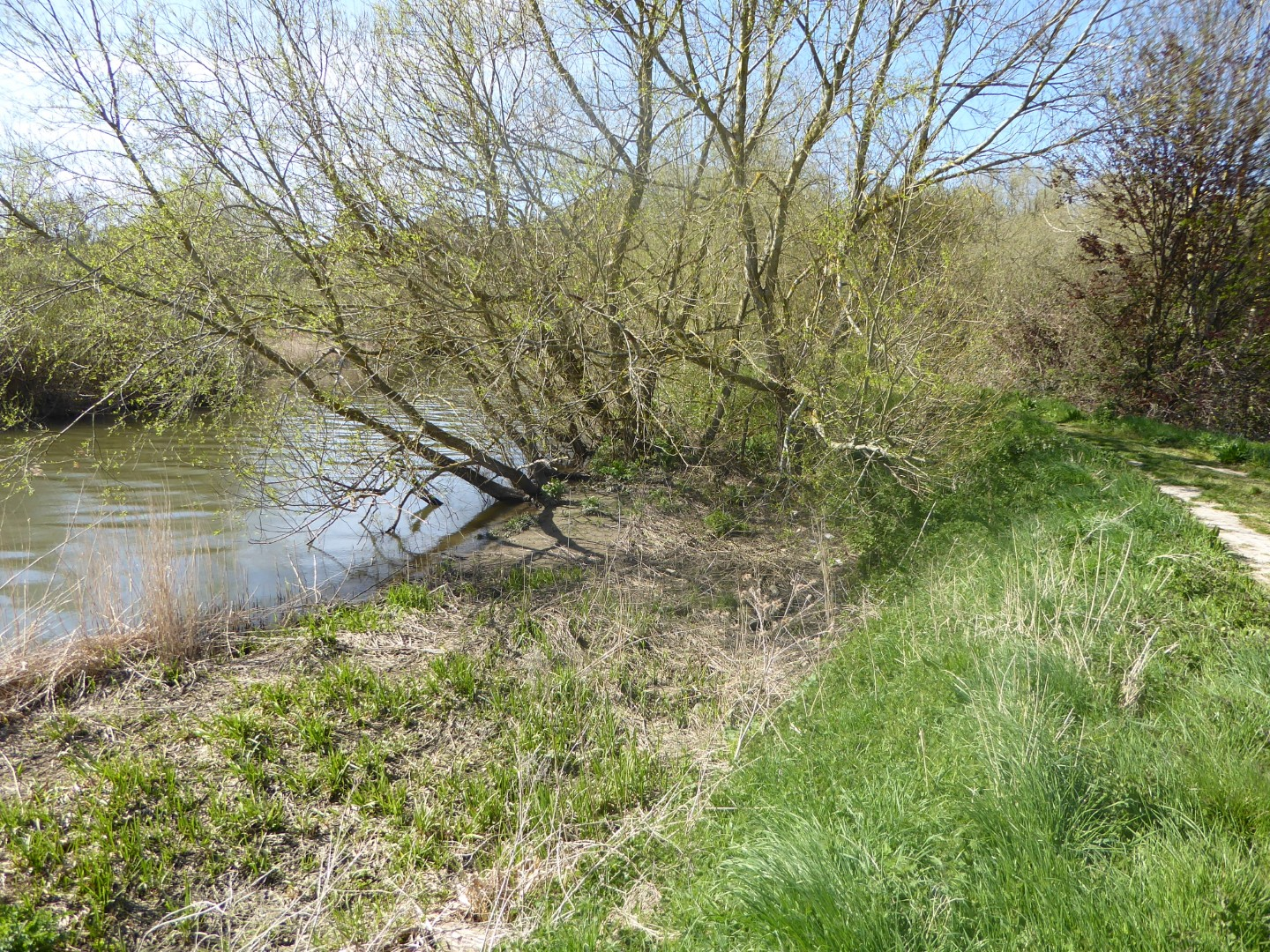
Riparian terrace woodland beside the River Stour in Kent

- W6d Sambucus nigra subcommunity is found on higher river banks, and may contain more terrestrial species such as ash and hawthorn.

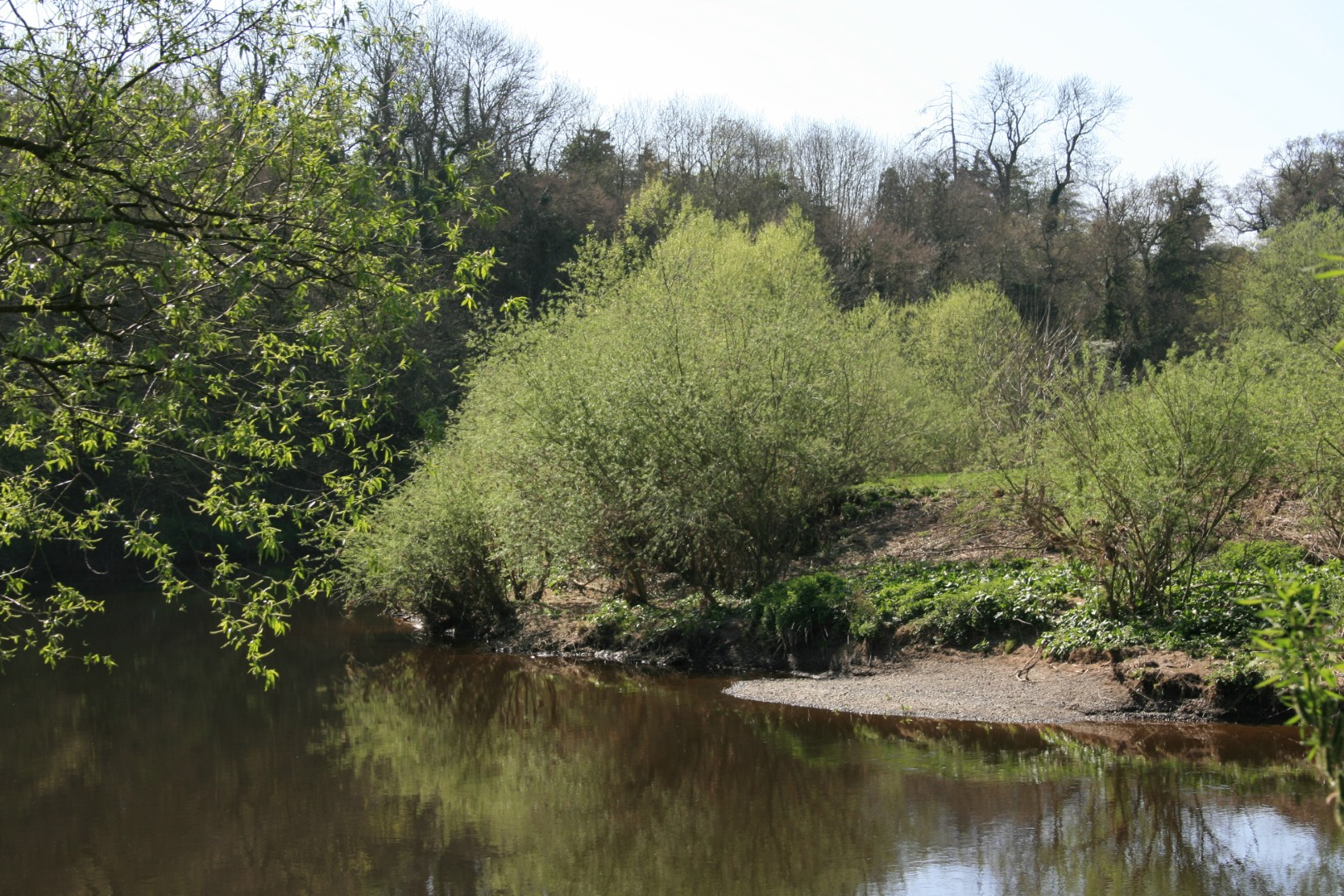
W6d willow scrub beside the River Stour in Kent

- W6e Betula pubescens occurs on acid, free-draining soils in Breckland, and is based on a 1915 study by Pickworth Farrow at Cavenham Heath. It was, at the time, subject to invasion by Pinus sylvestris.

== Zonation and succession ==
W6 woodland is generally found on the banks and in the floodplains of lowland rivers. On adjacent higher ground there can be scrub communities such as W21 Crataegus monogyna scrub, or lowland woodland types such as W8 Fraxinus excelsior and W10 Quercus robur woodland. In the upland fringes, W6 gives way to W7 or W9 along the narrower river margins. Other lowland damp woods include W1 Salix cinerea woodland, which is more typical of eutrophic lake margins and overgrown pools, and W2 Salix cinerea - Phragmites australis carr, which has an understorey of reeds and/or sedges and is usually less eutrophic than W6.

W6 is a climax community, so it does not succeed to anything else unless it dries out.

== Conservation ==
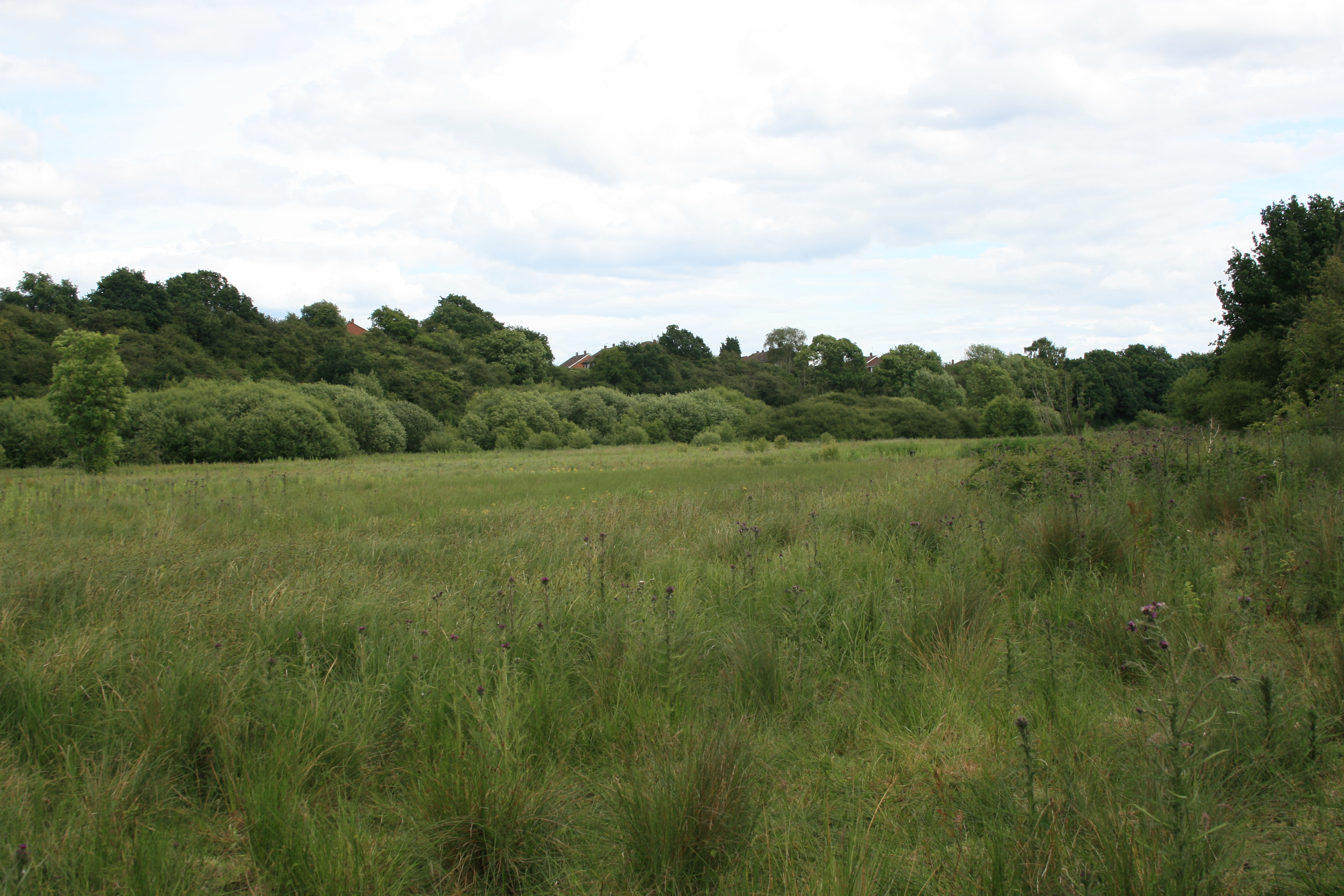
W6 "scrub" in the floodplain around Shrewsbury was such a significant landscape feature that both the town and the county derive their names from it.

Riparian woodland was once widespread in the valleys and floodplains of lowland Britain, but such land is so fertile and valuable for agriculture and habitation that, by the beginning of the 20th century, there was almost none left. In his wide-sweeping account of the vegetation of Britain in the 1930s, Arthur Tansley barely even mentioned riparian woodland as a feature of the countryside, describing alder carr only from partially-drained peatlands in the Norfolk Broads and Shropshire mosses. However, river valley alder woods were once common in many parts of the country. An old country name for alder is "woller", derived perhaps from the French orle or the German Erle, and this is reflected in the name of towns such as Wollerton and Allerton. Shrewsbury was (and still is) conspicuously surrounded by alder woodland: John Leland in 1542 reported that the ancient British name of the town was Pengwern, derived from the Welsh pen ("hill") and gwern ("alder"); the modern names "Shrewsbury" and "Shropshire" come from the Old English name Sċrobbesburh, which means "the town amongst the scrub".

Much of the willow woodland and scrub that now occurs along river valleys has grown back up over the last hundred years or so. During that time, elm, alder and ash have each become very prominent, but subsequently declined due to Dutch elm disease, alder pox and ash dieback, respectively. Currently, willow tends to dominate such woodlands.

This type of woodland is included within the "wet woodlands" on the UK Biodiversity Action Plan, which makes it a priority habitat under the NERC Act. Under the UK Habitats classification system, it is listed as W1d5 alder woodland on floodplains and recognised as a priority habitat.

== Other treatments ==
In Europe, the equivalent woodland type is the EUNIS habitat G1.1 Riparian and gallery woodland, with dominant Alnus, Betula, Populus or Salix, which are included in the Habitats Directive as 91E0 Alluvial forests with Alnus glutinosa and Fraxinus excelsior or 92A0 Salix alba and Populus alba galleries. (The word "gallery" in this context is what is usually called a terrace in England.) Northwest France has woodlands very similar to British W6, which they call forêts riveraines à saule blanc (riparian white willow woods) in places such as the Loire valley, where wild black poplars grow.

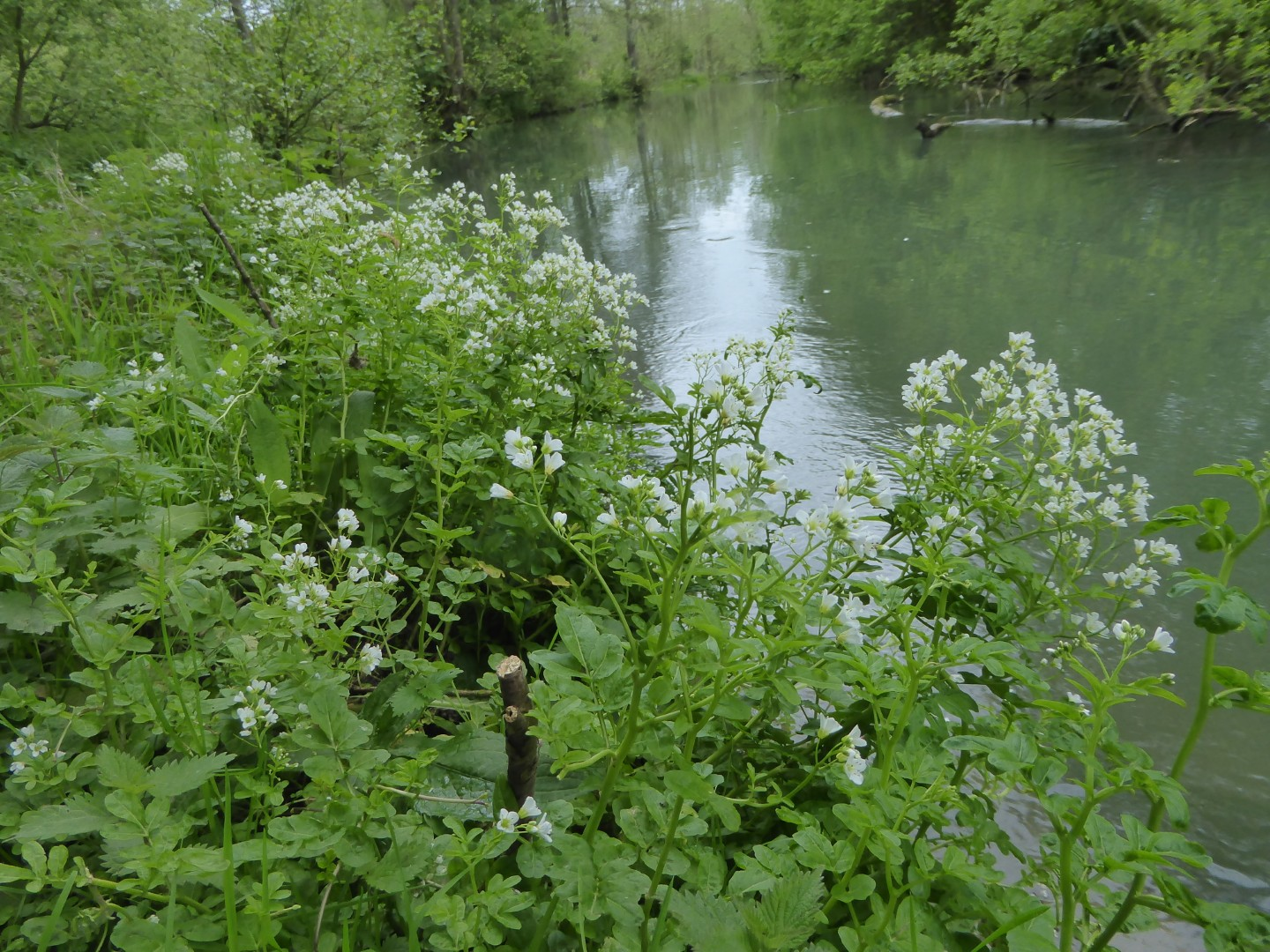
Large-flowered bittercress in riparian woodland in Normandy

Further south and east in Europe, the species-richness of riparian woodland increases, with trees such as narrow-leaved ash, box elder, grey alder and dark-leaved willow becoming increasingly frequent.

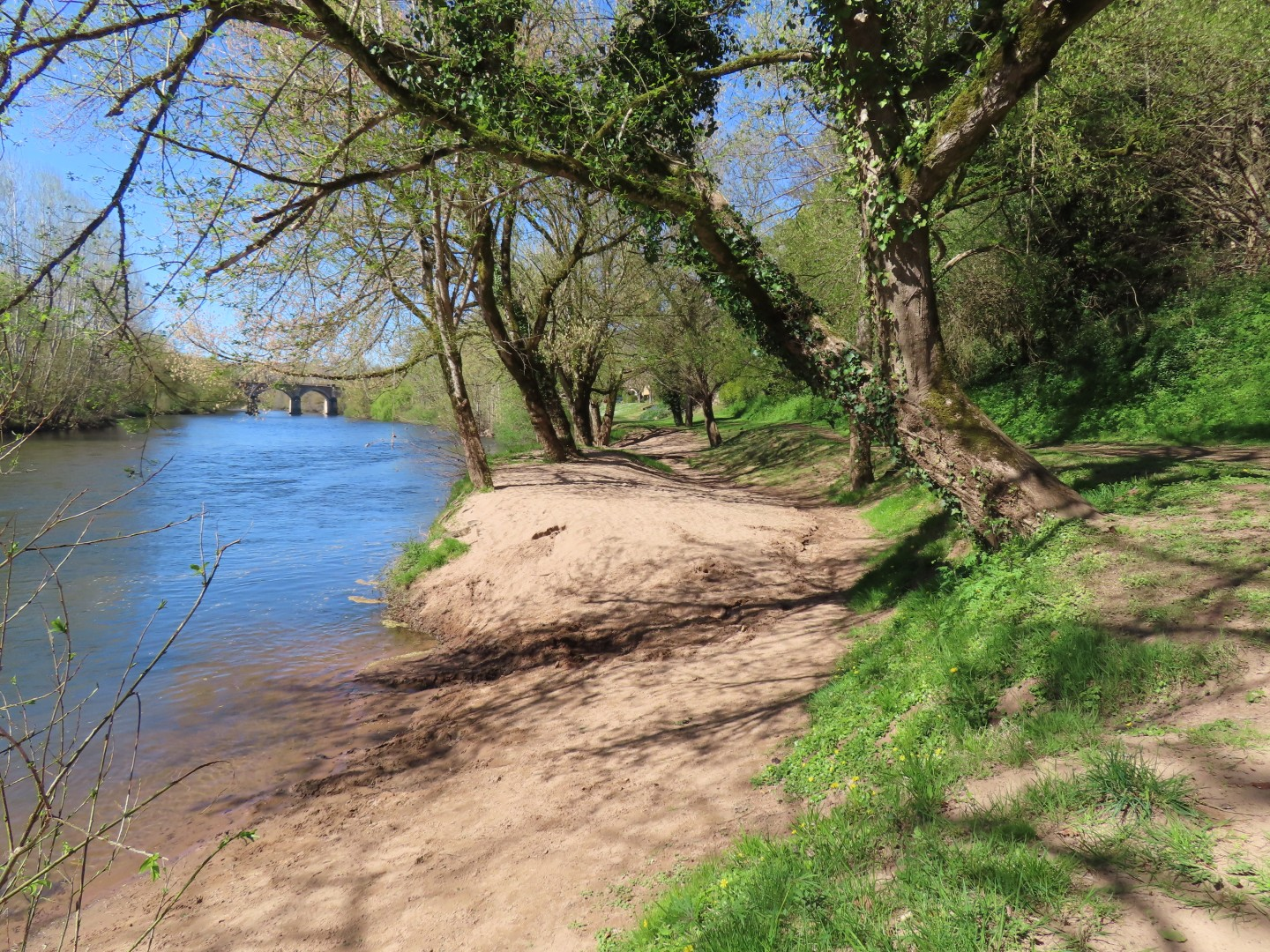
Box-elder riparian woodland in the Dordogne

From Brittany southwards, royal fern becomes a significant element of the ground flora in ripsylves (riparian forests), but it does not grow in this habitat in Britain.
