= British NVC community W5 =

Vegetation community in the United Kingdom

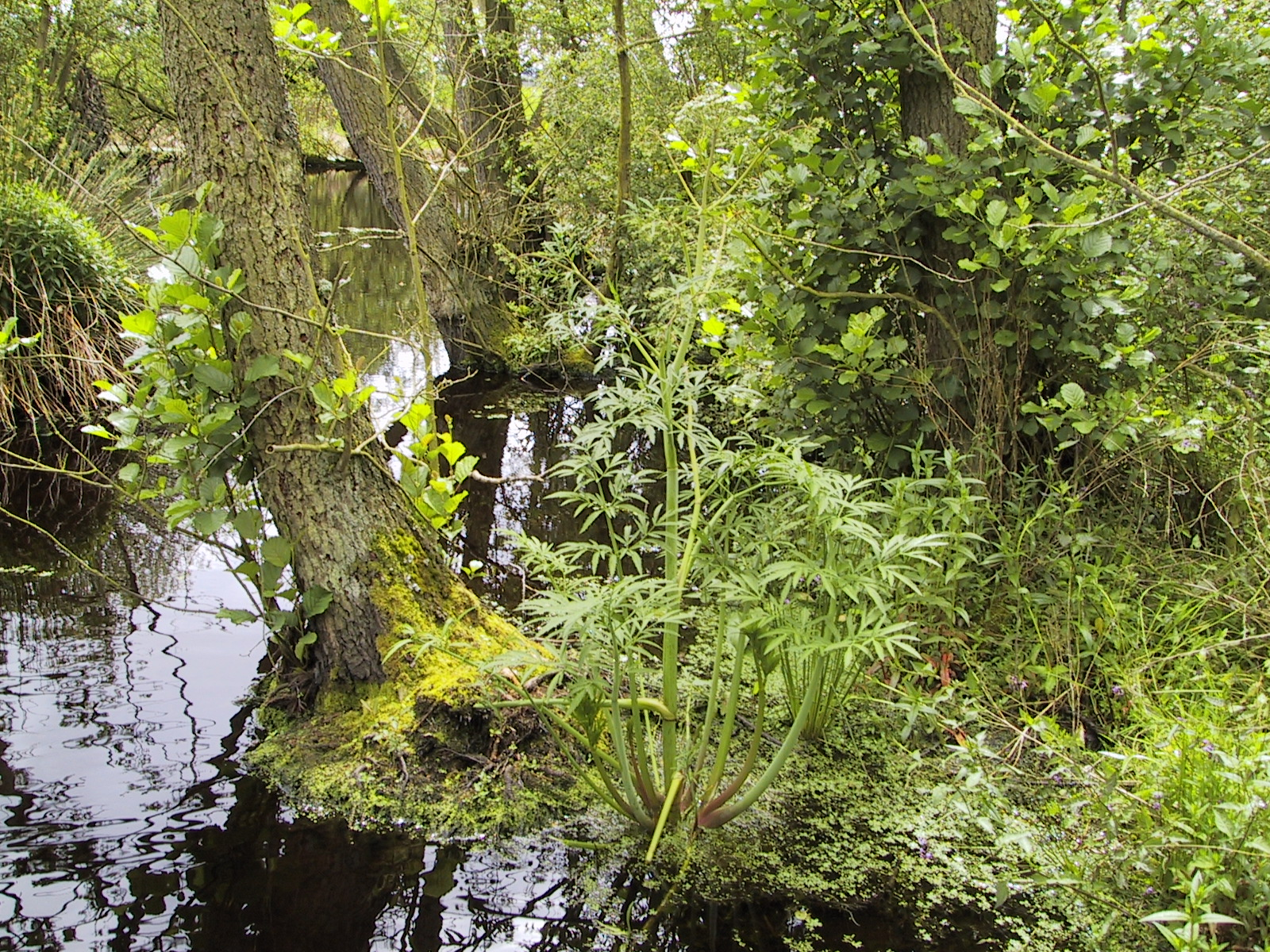
W5 woodland at Shrawardine Pool, Shropshire

NVC community W5 is one of the woodland communities in the British National Vegetation Classification system, characterised by a canopy of alder with a field layer of sedges and wetland plants, often over a peaty substrate. It is a form of primary woodland around freshwater lakes and bogs, or as a component of river valley wetlands, and is one of seven woodland communities in the NVC classed as wet woodlands. It was once very common but is now rare and localised.

== Description ==
W5 Alnus glutinosa-Carex paniculata woodland is rather local, but widespread, throughout the lowlands of England, Wales and Scotland. It occurs on moist, peaty soils, particularly on or around lakes and peat bogs with a fluctuating water level, although it can also be found on neutral to acid mineral soils in suitable locations. Its characteristic (constant) tree species are alder, downy birch and various species of willow.

The habitat is a seasonally-flooded landscape in which trees can only become established if they are tolerant of waterlogging (mainly alder and willow) or have a dry foothold, such as a clump of greater tussock sedge. Around the margins of a lake, grey willow and purple willow typically forms a distinct band over the deeper water, with increasing amounts of alder beyond that. The canopy is initially rather open, with a thick layer of sedges under the trees, but it can close over and produce a rather bare ground layer with only sparse clumps of herbs and ferns.

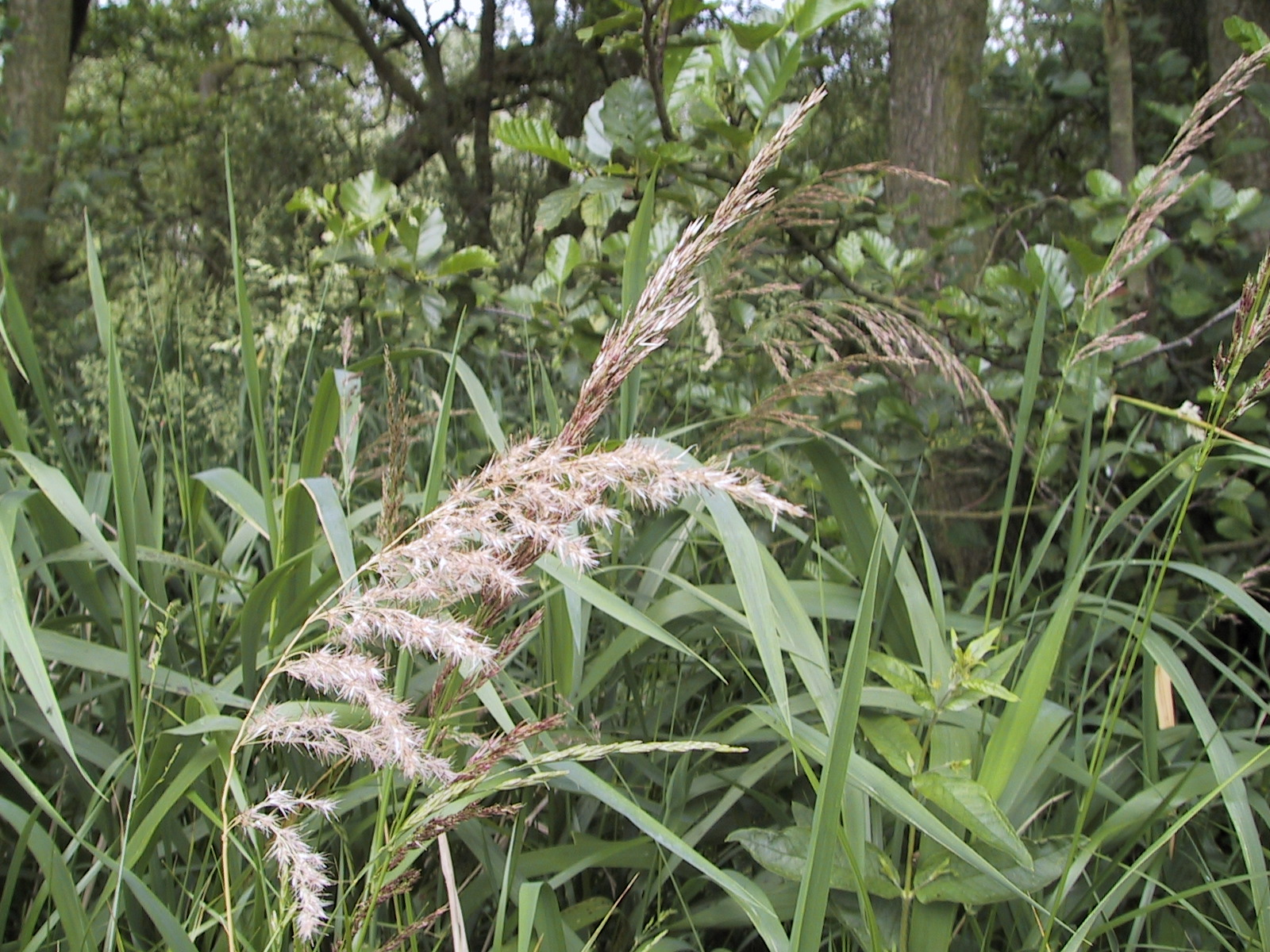
Purple small-reed in W5 alder carr at Norbury Mere, Cheshire

There are many rare and scarce plants that are restricted to or characteristic of W5 woodland. These include fibrous tussock-sedge, elongated sedge, cowbane, crested buckler-fern, milk parsley and marsh fern.

W5 alder carr is thought to have been very widespread in the past, before much of Britain's low-lying wetlands were drained. Only small quantities now remain, but it is nevertheless one of the most iconic of British habitats. Many examples of ancient or semi-natural W5 woodland are now protected as nature reserves or sites of special scientific interest, including those at Wicken Fen, Sweat Mere and Rhos Goch. It is a Priority Habitat under the UK Biodiversity Action Plan.

== Subcommunities ==
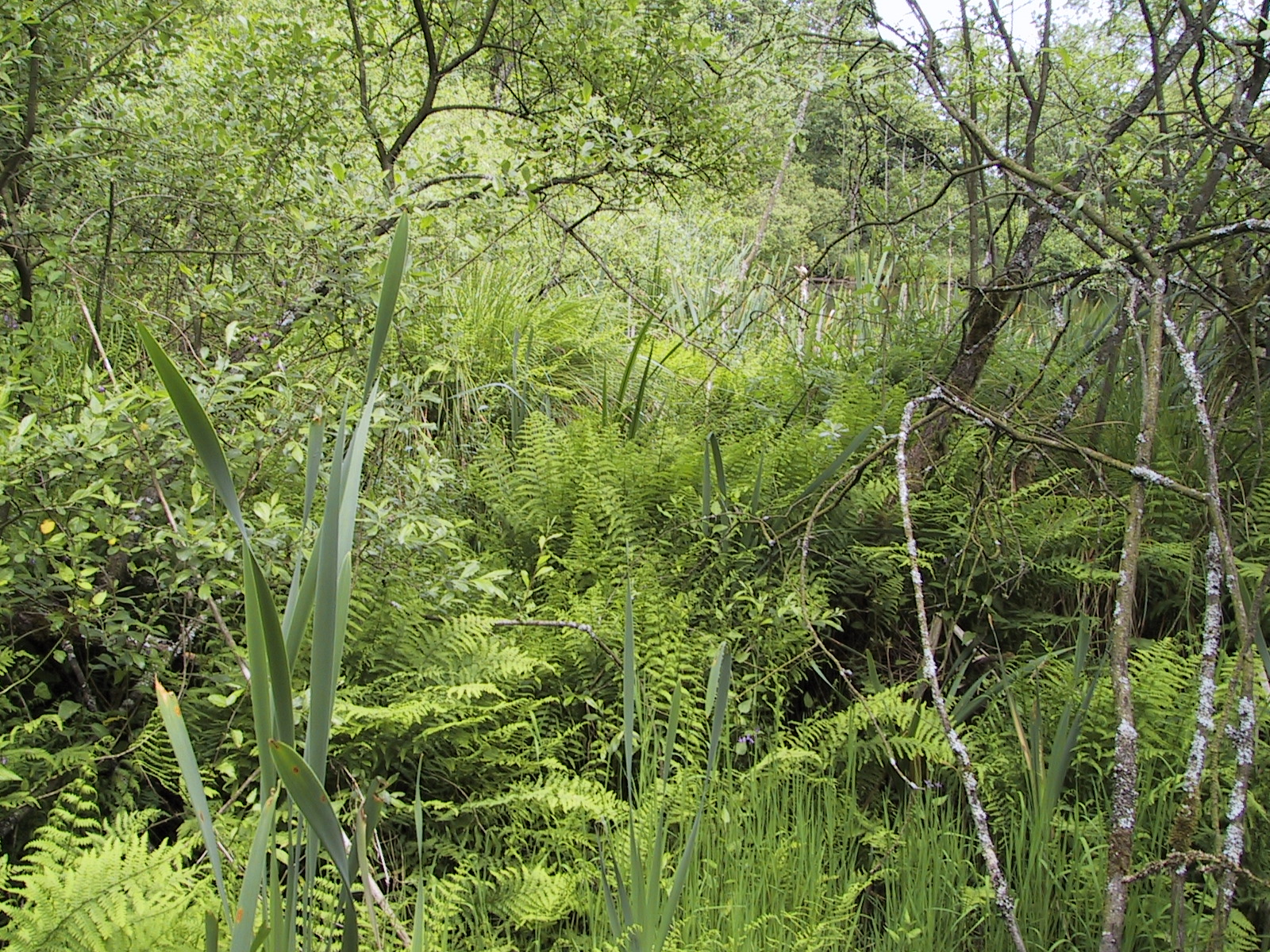
W5b woodland at Morton Pool, with marsh fern

There are three subcommunities:

- W5a Phragmites australis subcommunity tends to be a secondary woodland that has developed over reedbeds or sedge swamps. There is often an abundance of grey willow or downy birch in the initial stages, followed by increasing quantities of alder later on. Tall herbs such as meadowsweet and valerian often thrive within a field layer of common reed or sedges. Purple small-reed is sometimes characteristic of this type of carr.
- W5b Lysimachia vulgaris subcommunity is the classic ancient woodland community, which occurs in the "lagg" around peat bogs, where there is some surface water runoff, or in areas of fenland. It often contains distinctive plants that can be largely confined to this community in parts of the country, such as royal fern and greater spearwort in addition to the rarities listed above.

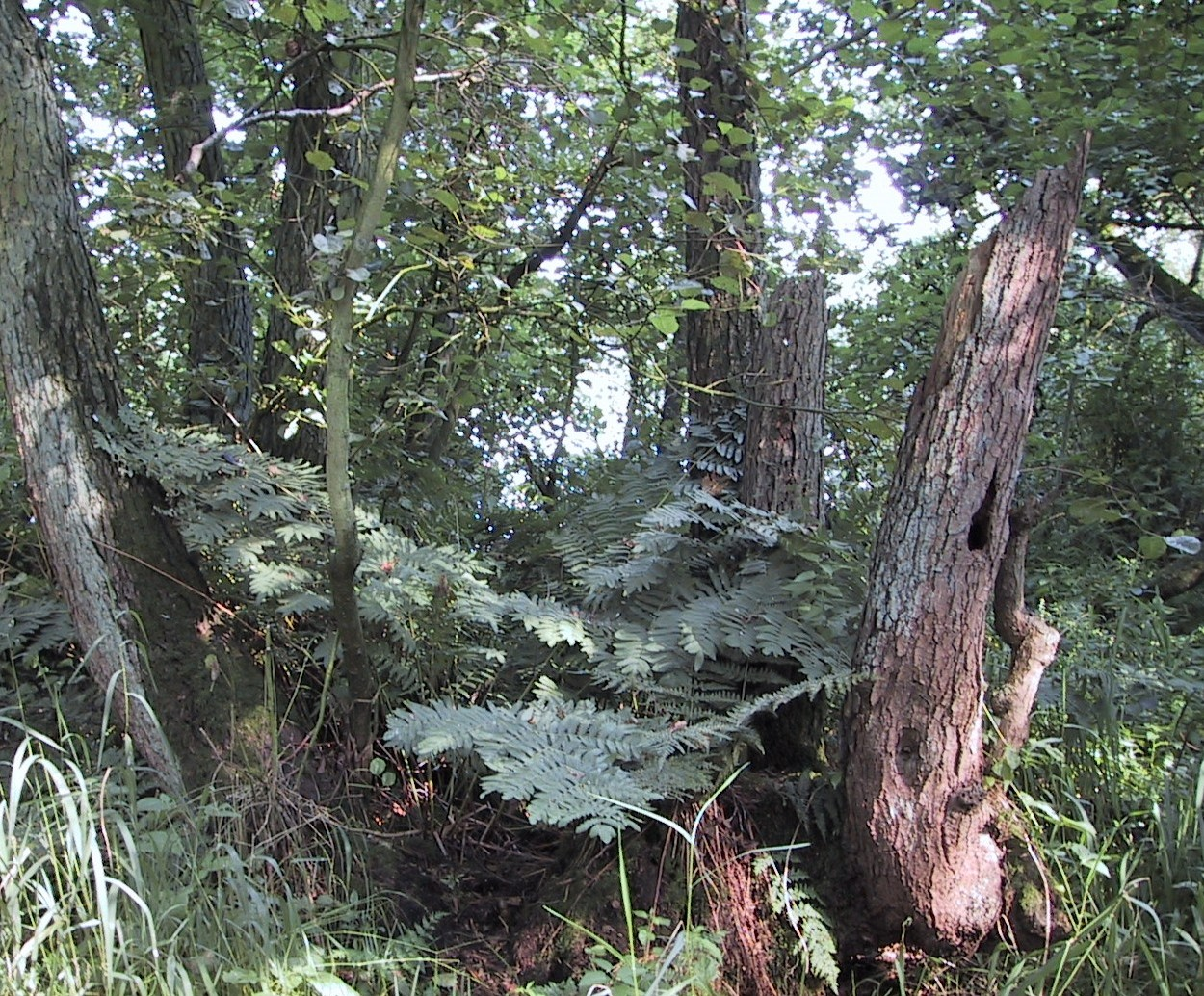
Royal fern is highly characteristic of W5 woodland.

- W5c Chrysosplenium oppositifolium subcommunity is a rather distinct variety that is found in river valleys, over mineral or only thinly peaty soils. It differs markedly from the peaty types in its development and flora, with characteristic riverside species including both opposite-leaved and alternate-leaved golden-saxifrages and hemlock water-dropwort.

== Zonation and succession ==
W5 woodland often occurs in a zone around freshwater lakes or peat bogs, where it is seen as part of the hydrosere from open water to dry woodland. Typically, there is an area of reeds or sedge in the wettest areas, with some scrub invasion leading to W1 Salix cinerea woodland. W5 occurs to the landward side of this, followed by dry woodland that might be W6 A. glutinosa or W10 Quercus robur woodland. In some places a W5 woodland may have birch instead of alder, but it is distinguished from W4 Betula pubescens woodland by the acidity of the soil, and the presence of purple moor-grass or an abundance of Sphagnum mosses in that community.

== Other treatments ==
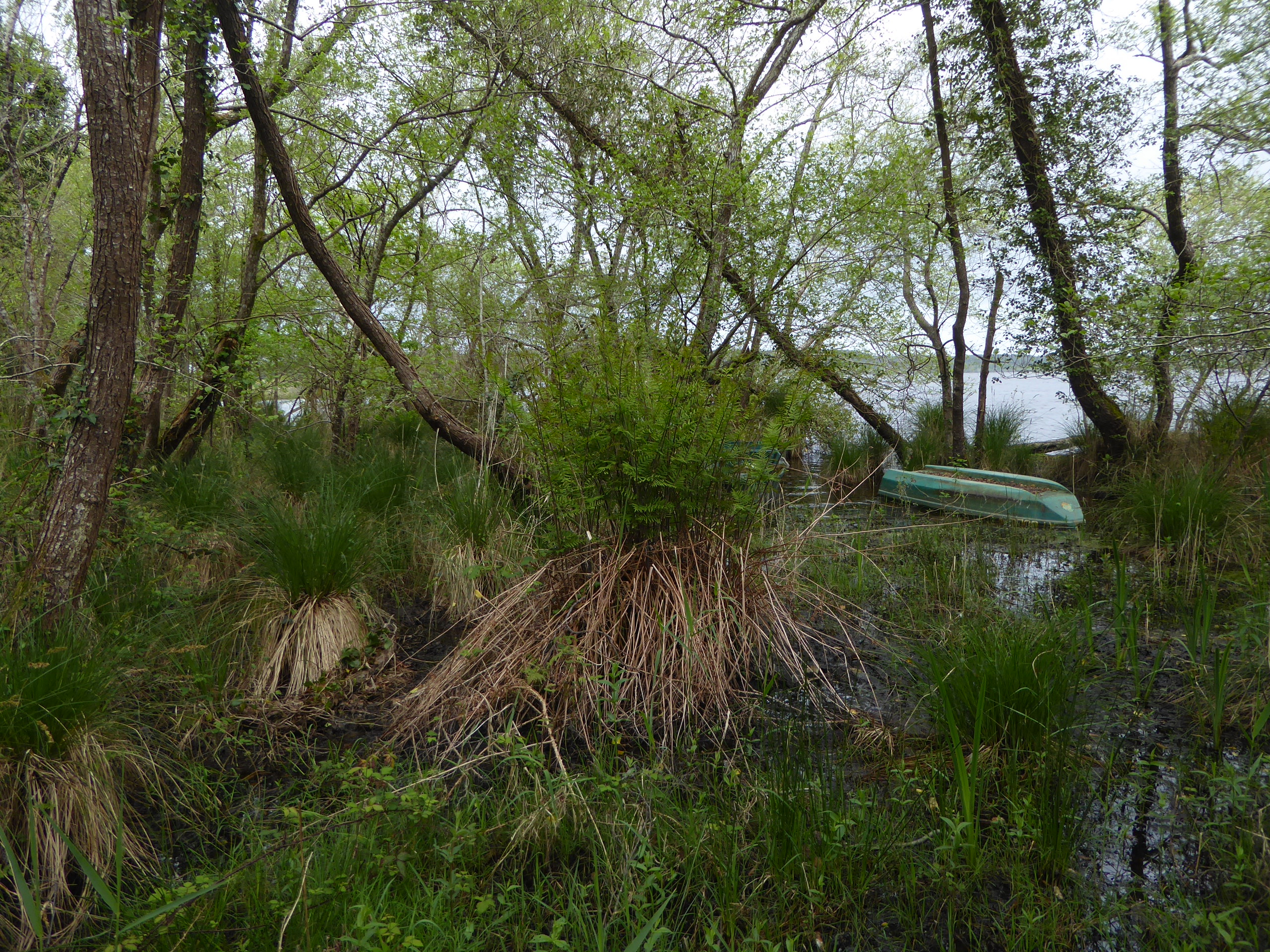
Alder carr with royal fern in the Réserve naturelle nationale du Courant d'Huchet

There is no direct equivalent to W5 in the European EUNIS habitats system, but it is encompassed within the F9.2 willow carr and fen scrub and the G1.52 alder swamp woods on acid peat. Throughout northern Europe, river valley alder woods analogous to the W5c subcommunity are widespread. Woodland very similar to W5 occurs on the peaty soils of lower Normandy and Brittany, where it is divided into two types: forêts humides à aulne glutineux (wet alder woodland) and, for the Chrysosplenium subcommunity, forêts riveraines à frêne élevé (riparian ash woodland).

In Britain, an important early study was by Marietta Pallis in the Norfolk Broads in the 1900s. She described the formation of "swamp carr" from tussock sedge swamps, "fen carr" from reedswamp, and "ultimate carr" from both of these as they mature. The first two types had a ground flora that was largely similar to the precursor vegetation, but the ultimate carr had more trees and shrubs. Although Pallas's studies were of the development of secondary woodland, she considered the ultimate carr to be a climax community. All three of Pallis's vegetation types would be considered W5 in the NVC.

In 1938 Roy Clapham described the hydrosere around Sweat Mere in Shropshire, which includes what is possibly the first example of an ancient woodland alder carr to be recorded in the ecological literature. The Shropshire-Cheshire plain once contained vast areas of wet woodland and many small areas still persist. A later analysis by Sinker et al. divided the alder woods into four types, following the system developed by G.F. Peterken: 7A valley woods, 7B wet valley woods, 7C plateau alder woods and 7D slope alder woods. Of these, only 7B is similar to W5b and 7D may be W5c in the NVC; 7A could be analogous to W7 while 7C is perhaps W4.

In County Durham, Gordon Graham assigned alder and willow carr into his "WOC9" community in a study in the 1970s and 1980s. The Witton-le-Weir alder woods stands in particular seem to belong to W5.
