= W4 =

W4 may refer to:

- Form W-4, an American tax form
- W4, IATA code of Wizz Air Malta
- Heart Nebula or Westerhout 4, an interstellar cloud in Cassiopeia
- London W4, a postcode district in west London, England
- W4 (nuclear warhead), a planned variant of the 1949–1953 Mark 4 nuclear bomb
- W4, complete oxidation of metal, a degree of meteorite weathering
- WLLZ (FM), a radio station in Detroit, USA, known as W4 from 1966 to 2000
- WWWW-FM or W4 Country, a country music radio station in Ann Arbor, USA
- W4, then IATA code for LC Perú, a Peruvian airline which operated until 2018
- Warwick W-4 Hot Canary, a racing biplane
- W4 tram, a class of electric trams built by the Melbourne & Metropolitan Tramways Board
- British NVC community W4, a type of woodland

== See also ==
- 4W (disambiguation)
