= W13 =

W13 may refer to:

- British NVC community W13, one of the woodland communities in the British National Vegetation Classification system
- Eagle's Nest Airport (Virginia), in Augusta County, Virginia, United States
- Hansa-Brandenburg W.13, a German flying boat bomber
- London Buses route W13
- Mercedes W13, a racing car
- Rhombicuboctahedron
- Route W13 (WMATA), a former bus route in Maryland
- W-13-class minesweeper of the Imperial Japanese Navy
- W13 nuclear warhead
- Watjanti language
- W13, a postcode district in London, England
