= British NVC community W2 =

UK plant community type

NVC community W2 (Salix cinerea - Betula pubescens - Phragmites australis woodland) is one of the woodland communities in the British National Vegetation Classification system. It is one of seven woodland communities in the NVC classed as "wet woodlands".

This is a fairly locally distributed community. There are two subcommunities.

== Community composition ==
Three constant species is found in this community, Grey Willow (Salix cinerea), Downy Birch (Betula pubescens) and Common Reed (Phragmites australis).

Six rare species are also associated with the community:

- Elongated Sedge (Carex elongata)
- Crested Buckler-fern (Dryopteris cristata)
- the fern Dryopteris × uliginosa, the hybrid of Crested Buckler-fern and Narrow Buckler-fern (D. carthusiana)
- Milk-parsley (Peucedanum palustre)
- Round-leaved Wintergreen (Pyrola rotundifolia)
- Marsh Fern (Thelypteris palustris)

== Distribution ==
This community is distributed in two main areas of Britain - East Anglia and Northwest England. There are also examples in South Wales and Yorkshire

== Subcommunities ==
There are two subcommunities:

- the Alnus glutinosa - Filipendula ulmaria subcommunity
- the Sphagnum ssp. subcommunity
