= British NVC community W8 =

Vegetation community in the United Kingdom

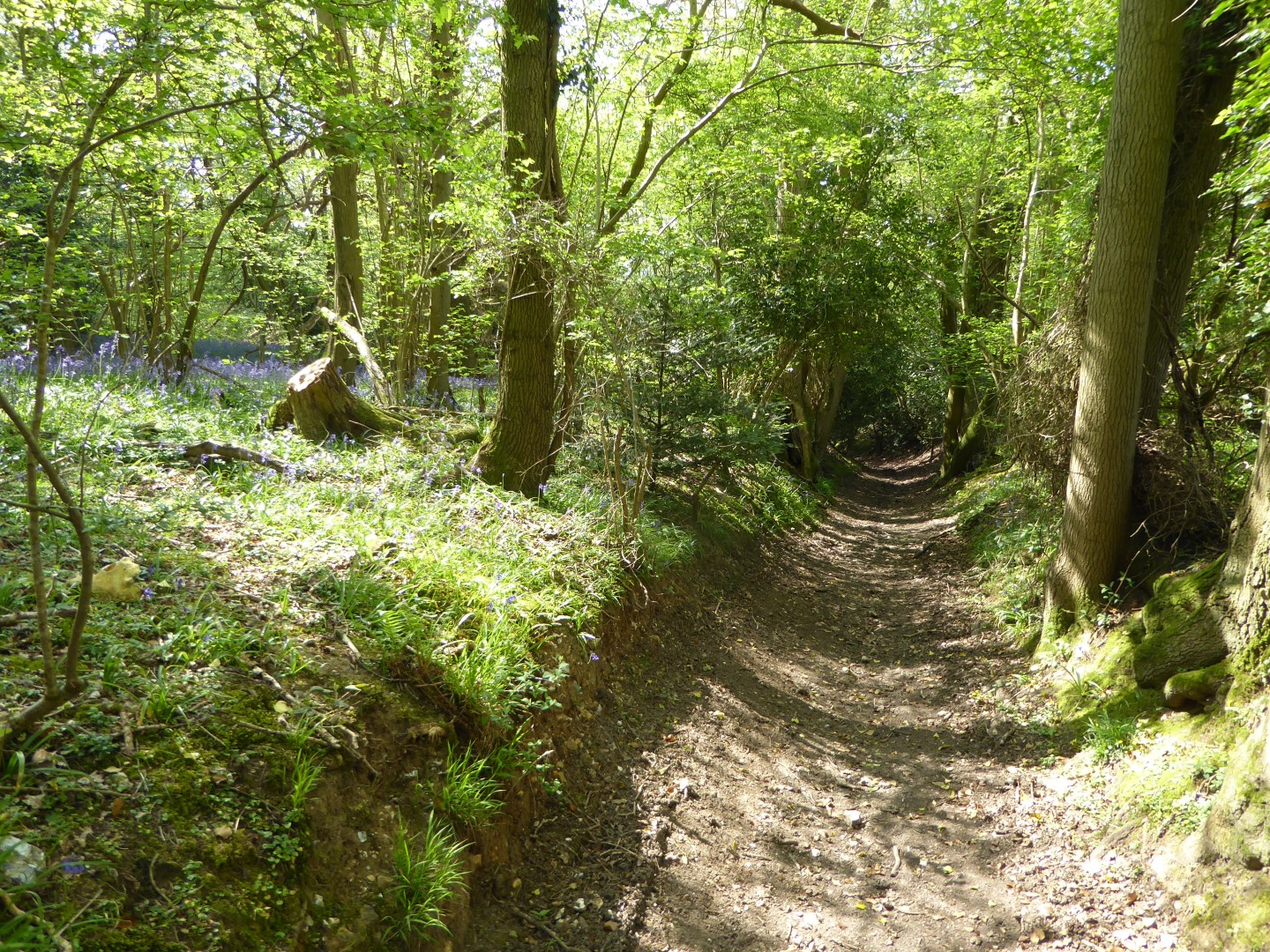
W8 Fraxinus excelsior woodland in Kent

NVC community W8 Fraxinus excelsior - Acer campestre - Mercurialis perennis woodland is one of the woodland communities in the British National Vegetation Classification system. It is one of the main climax communities in the British countryside, once covering much of the lowlands and upland fringes, wherever there is a calcareous soil.

== Description ==
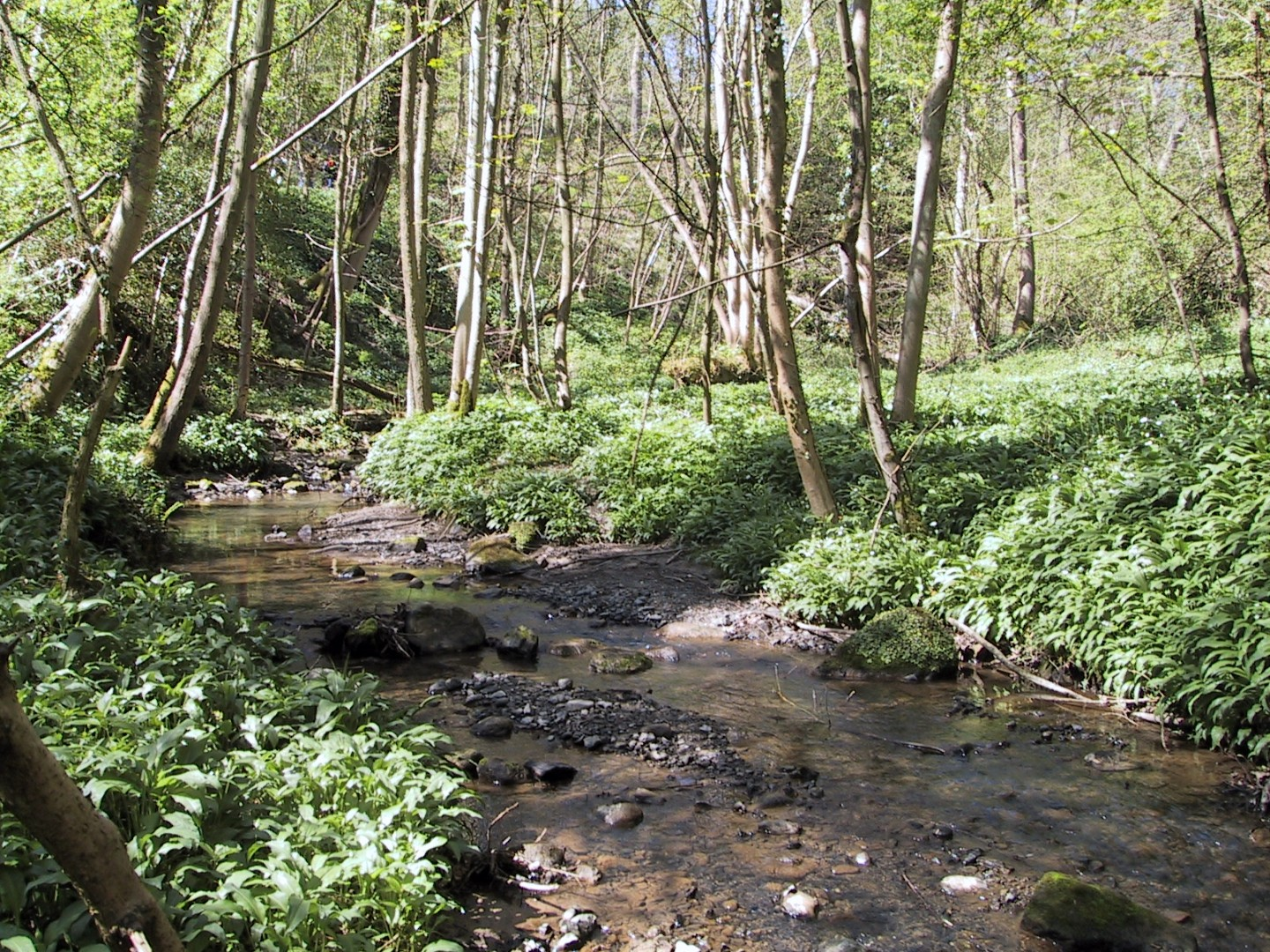
W8 woodland in Loamhole Dingle, Shropshire

W8 Fraxinus excelsior (ash) woodland accounts for most of the lowland dry, calcareous woodland in Britain. It occurs on a range of soils, from the circumneutral but base-rich through to chalk or limestone exposures. Before the 1970s, this type of woodland was often dominated by elms (English elm or smooth elm) but these trees were largely destroyed by Dutch elm disease except in a few places; although even today English elm suckers are still common in ancient W8 woodlands. From then until the 2010s, ash became often the dominant tree in W8 woodland, often with a proportion of oak (usually pedunculate oak). However, ash dieback has reduced the cover of the ash canopy in many woods, especially where the trees are stressed, as on dry slopes. There are indications that ash is becoming resistant to the disease, but in many woods other trees may be taking the place of this species in the woodland canopy; hazel, aspen, wild cherry and Turkey oak may become the primary beneficiaries.

The canopy of an intact W8 wood is usually dominated by ash, but other species may replace it, especially in planted woods. Ancient, semi-natural woods may have a proportion of field maple and often an understorey of hazel. Hornbeam woods with midland hawthorn make a distinctive variety of W8, especially in the south of Britain, whereas small-leaved and large-leaved lime occur further north. Some rare or uncommon species are primarily found in W8 woodland, including several types of whitebeam, wayfaring tree, crab apple and Plymouth pear.

More important than the canopy trees, for recognising this type of woodland, is the ground flora. Dog's mercury is a key feature, being present in abundance in most stands. It is never so prolific in oak woods, but it can be equally common in other types of ash wood (W7 and W9) or in calcareous beech woods (W12). Other characteristic woodland herbs in this community include wood anemone, primrose and yellow archangel. Bluebell can be present but is usually not as abundant as in oak wood, and bracken should be scarce.

Rare species that are largely restricted to W8 woodland include narrow-leaved bittercress, mezerion, wood fescue, mountain currant, oxlip and large-leaved lime.

== Subcommunities ==
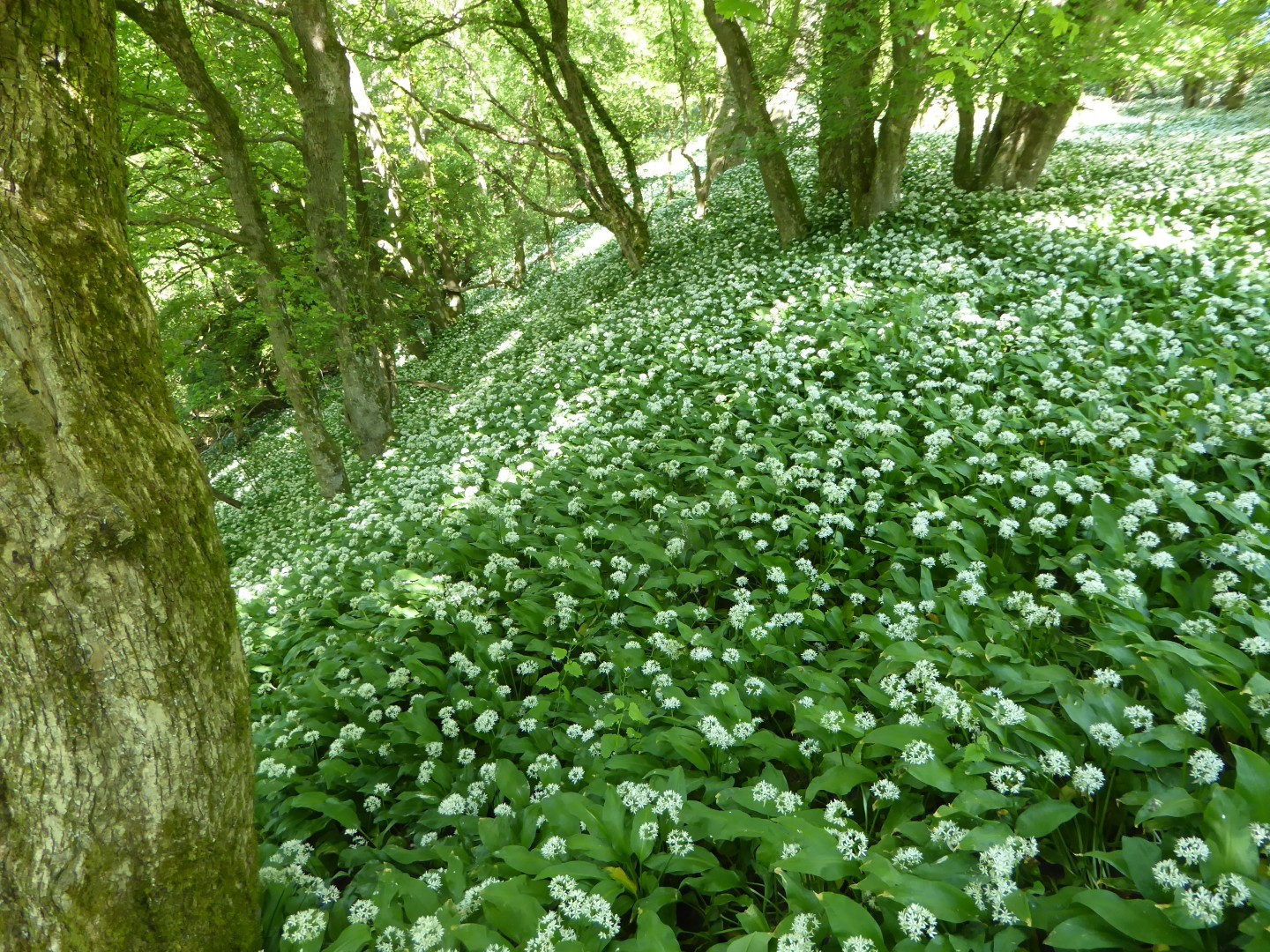
W8f Allium ursinum woodland

As probably the most well-studied (and widespread) woodland type in Britain, the variation within W8 is considerable. This mostly relates to the way that soil type, rainfall, altitude, climate and management affect the details of the ground flora. Seven subcommunities are described in British Plant Communities:

- W8a Primula vulgaris - Glechoma hederacea subcommunity is characteristic of wetter, slightly acid soils in the SE of Britain, where woods were typically coppiced and planted with oak standards.
- W8b Anemone nemorosa is found on heavy clay soils throughout the lowlands. It is this community that is most likely to make up the hornbeam/midland hawthorn woodlands, often with frequent lesser celandine in the ground layer.
- W8c Deschampsia cespitosa is usually found on woodland margins or in coppice clearings, where it can be a temporary occurrence. It can be recognised by the strong growth of tall herbs, such as great willowherb, rosebay willowherb and perforate St. John's-wort.
- W8d Hedera helix describes stands of secondary or disturbed woodland where increased light levels have allowed ivy to increase, although this less species-rich community persists in the dense shade of a closed canopy.
- W8e Geranium robertianum is arguably the "normal" type of woodland, being found everywhere on calcareous, well-drained soils and it is the one most likely to harbour a species-rich ground flora with a variety of rare plants, especially in ancient, semi-natural stands.
- W8f Allium ursinum typically occurs on hillsides with lateral flow of subsurface water creating a damp but never inundated soil. It is dominated by wild garlic, but that alone does not necessarily indicate a W8f woodland, as that species can also be favoured by selective grazing, particularly by deer. It is strictly a western type of vegetation
- W8g Teucrium scorodonia subcommunity is largely restricted to the Derbyshire Dales and the Wye Valley, where it is distinctive for the presence of both species of lime, English whitebeam, rock whitebeam, grey-leaved whitebeam and round-leaved whitebeam.

== Distribution and zonation ==
This community is widespread throughout lowland Britain, becoming scarcer in the uplands of the north and west, where it is replaced by community W9.

Along river valleys in England, W8 often grades into W7 towards the source, where the soil is wetter. On chalk or limestone exposures, W8 is often the main community on slopes but replaced on the plateau by W10 if the soil is deeper and less calcareous.

Scrub communities often succeed to W8 as their climax community. W21 hawthorn scrub and hedges can develop into W8 ash woodland as the ground flora and the trees mature, as can W22 and W24.

== Other treatments ==
In the European EUNIS habitat classification system, the equivalent vegetation is G1.A Meso- and eutrophic Quercus, Carpinus, Fraxinus, Acer, Tilia, Ulmus and related woodland. This includes habitat 9180 Tilio-Acerion forests of slopes, screes and ravines, which accounts for the more western 'rainforest' types of W8 (and W9), and are considered some of the most important woods in Britain. Some 29 SACs have been designated, and it is a qualifying feature in many others.
