= 4W =

4W or 4-W may refer to:

== Units of measurement ==
- 4°W, or 4th meridian west, a longitude coordinate
- 4 watts
- 4 weeks
- 4 wins, abbreviated in a Win–loss record (pitching)

== Transportation ==
- SLC-4W, designation for one of two launch pads at Vandenberg Air Force Base Space Launch Complex 4
- AD-4W, a model of Douglas A-1 Skyraider
- 4-wheel vehicle, especially vehicles with four wheel drive
- BP-4W, a model of Mazda B engine
- 4w (locomotive), a type of locomotive under the Whyte notation

== Other ==
- 04W, a designation for Typhoon Nina (1975)
- 4W, the production code for the 1977 Doctor Who serial The Sun Makers

== See also ==
- W4 (disambiguation)
