= British NVC community W10 =

Vegetation community in the United Kingdom

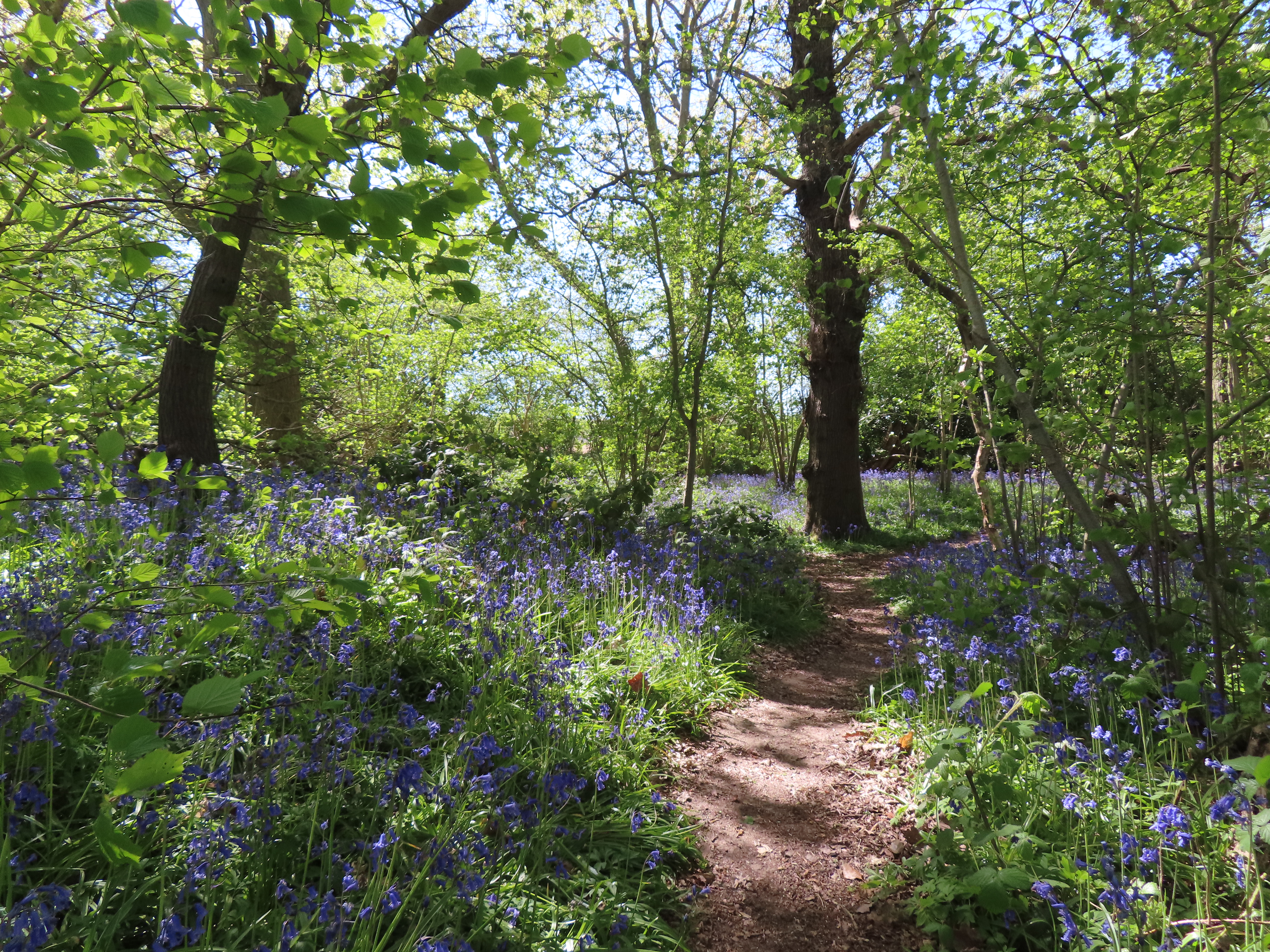
W10 woodland in Clowes Wood, Blean, Kent

NVC community W10 is one of the woodland communities in the British National Vegetation Classification system, characterised by a canopy of pedunculate oak and silver birch with a ground flora of bramble, honeysuckle and bracken. In lowland areas, it is the main climax community wherever there is a free-draining circumneutral soil.

== Description ==
W10 Quercus robur - Pteridium aquilinum - Rubus fruticosus woodland woodland accounts for most of the lowland dry, neutral woodland in Britain. It occurs on a range of soil types, from clay and humus through to sandstone, ranging from dry to damp, but not permanently wet or flooded. It extends into the upland fringes, where there is a gradual transition to the more acid W16 and W17 woodland types.

The main canopy tree is usually pedunculate oak, sometimes replaced locally by sessile oak or the hybrid Q. ^{x}rosacea, especially when these have been planted for forestry purposes. Natural stands tend to have a large quantity of birch, usually silver birch but sometimes downy birch as well, and these tend to dominate in secondary woods and regrowth (for example, where conifer plantations have been cleared). Holly, hazel and goat- or grey willow are often present in the shrub layer. Regional variants include small-leaved lime in the north of England, and whitebeam, hornbeam and Midland hawthorn in southern counties. Alder buckthorn and wild service are both fairly frequent in W10 woods, although more common in more acid and more calcareous woods, respectively. Plantations often have the dominant trees replaced by sweet chestnut, sycamore or conifers such as Corsican pine and Douglas fir.

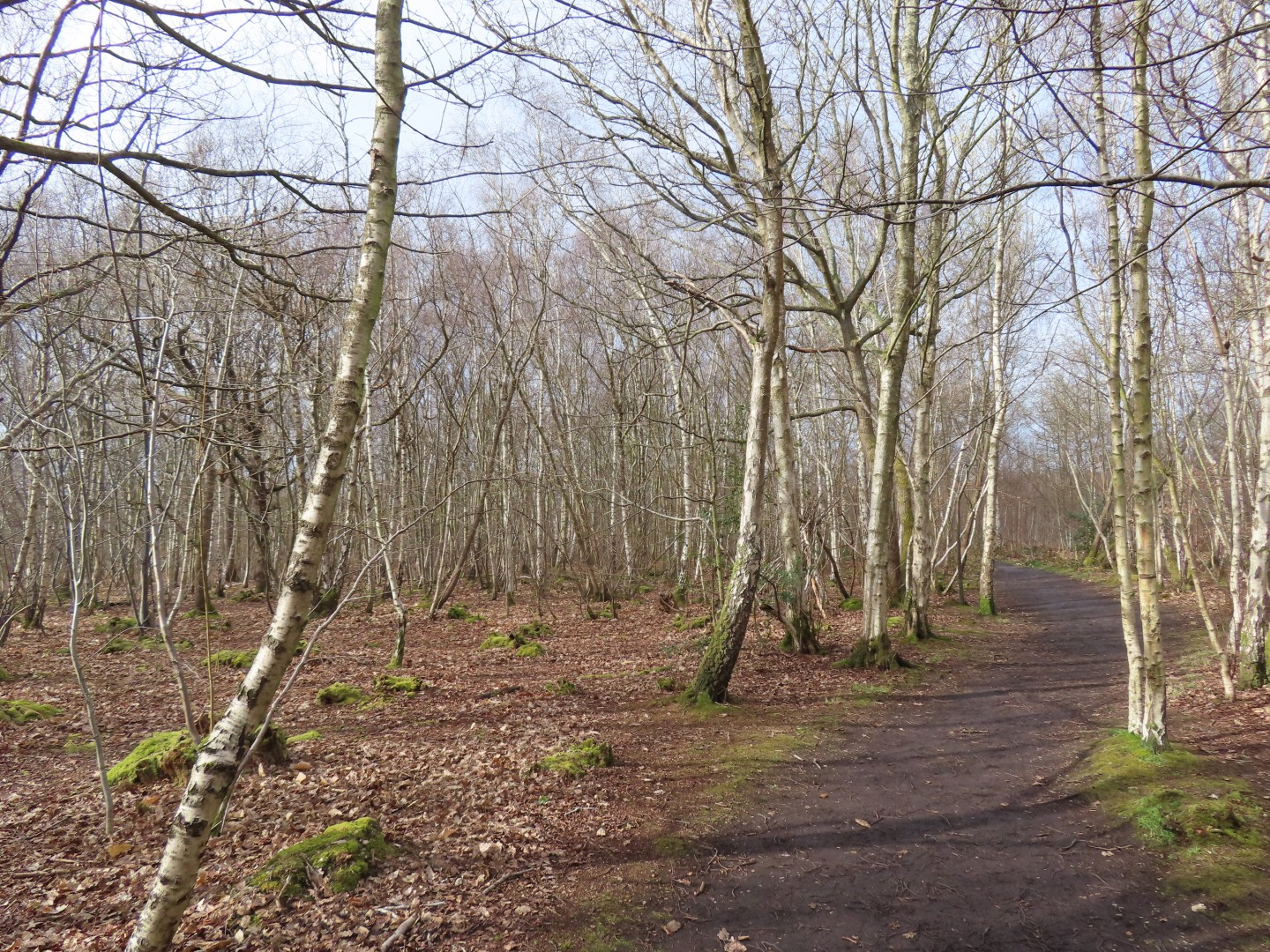
Birch trees are the first to regenerate after woodland clearance.

The ground flora of a W10 wood can include a huge range of plants, especially as the soil can be slightly acid or slightly alkaline in localised patches. In general, though, it is often rather dull, in that flowers are not as abundant as in calcareous woods such as W8. However, in spring patches of bluebell, wood anemone and sometimes ramsons can create a good display, especially along rides and in coppiced stands. Characteristic plants include wood millet, wood spurge, red campion and common cow-wheat, and there are a few rare plants specific to W10: lesser periwinkle, southern wood-rush and fragrant agrimony are perhaps the most notable. In the summer, the floor of the wood tends to be dominated by bracken and/or bramble, with little else to be seen.

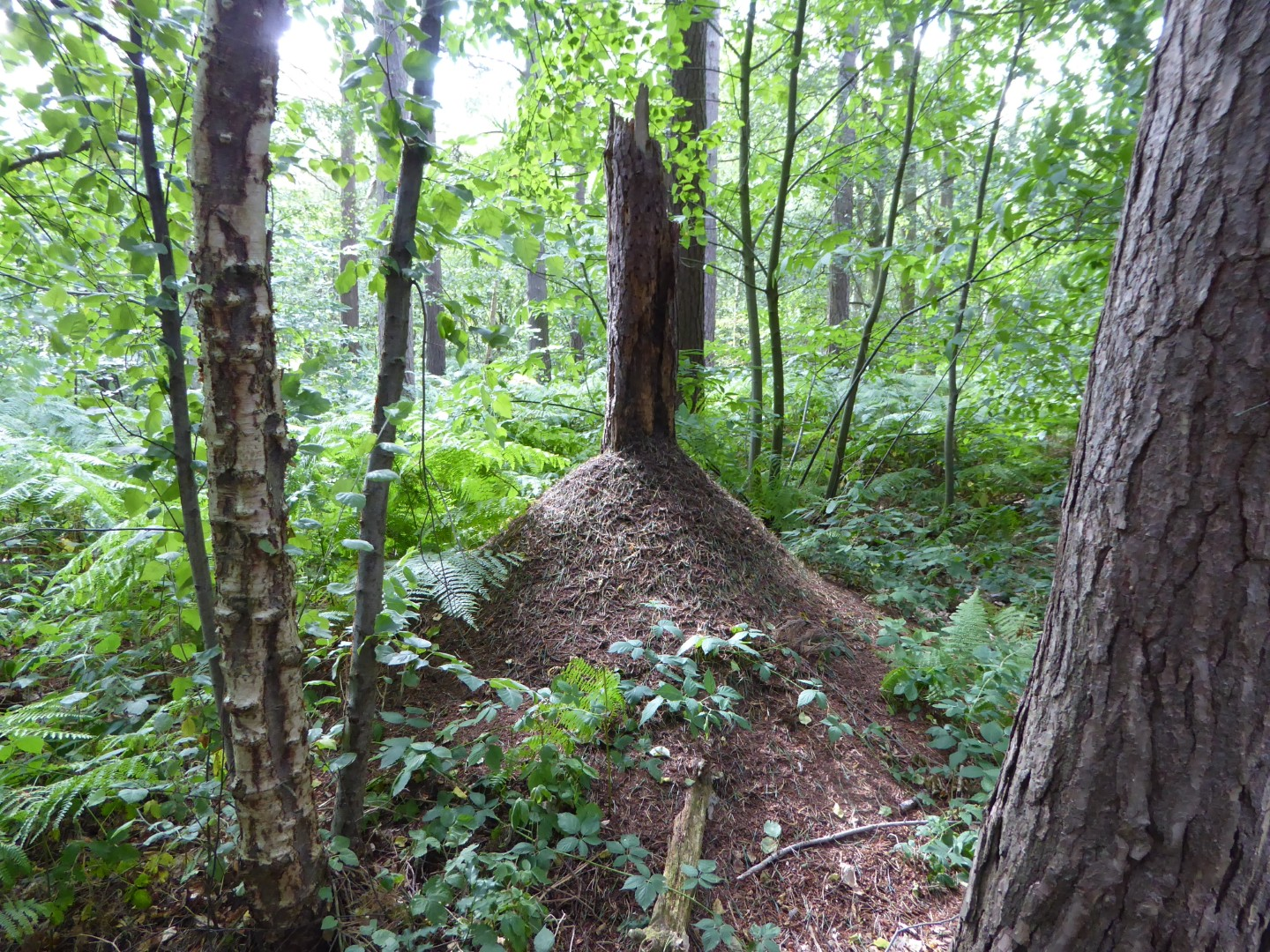
The southern wood ant makes its nests in W10 woodlands.

== Subcommunities ==
Five subcommunities are described in British Plant Communities:

- W10a typical subcommunity is the main woodland type in the SE of Britain, and it often contains large stands of bluebell in spring
- W10b Anemone nemorosa is where there is a dominance of wood anemone in the ground layer, often in places where sweet chestnut coppicing has favoured it
- W10c Hedera helix subcommunity is an obscure variant with less bracken than normal, and more plants of high light levels, perhaps indicating past disturbance
- W10d Holcus lanatus is more species-poor and is often found in secondary woodland or plantations where ancient woodland plants are less common
- W10e Acer pseudoplatanus - Oxalis acetosella is a slightly more acidic variant found towards the north-west, and sessile oak might be more common, sometimes with mountain ash.

== Distribution and zonation ==
This community is widespread throughout lowland Britain, becoming scarcer in the uplands of the north and west, where it is replaced by W16 and W17. In places where beech is common or dominant, the correct community is usually W14 Fagus sylvatica woodland, although the ground flora can be almost identical to that within W10.

Along river valleys, W10 typically borders W6 alder carr as they are both communities of neutral soils. A few trees of alder lining a streamside within an oak wood, however, do not necessarily constitute a separate community. A good way to determine whether there is really a riparian wetland present is to judge whether there is river sediment deposited within a floodplain or not. However, a wood with a large proportion of alder or willow in it is unlikely to be W10. Similarly, a damp hollow with some grey willow is common within any wood, but it needs to be fairly extensive before it makes a transition to W1 willow carr.

Scrub communities often succeed to W10 as their climax community. W23 Ulex europaeus, W24 Rubus fruticosus and W25 Pteridium aquilinum scrub are all most likely to end up as W10 if left undisturbed.

== Other treatments ==
In the European EUNIS habitat classification system, the equivalent vegetation is (or was) G1.A11 Mixed Atlantic bluebell oak forests, although that is not currently listed on the European Environment Agency website. Instead, there is only the wide-ranging G1.A Meso- and eutrophic Quercus, Carpinus, Fraxinus, Acer, Tilia, Ulmus and related woodland. This is not an Annex 1 habitat under the EU Habitats Directive, and so it has no special protection in the Natura 2000 network.
