= British NVC community W13 =

UK plant community type

NVC community W13 (Taxus baccata woodland), also known as Yew woodland, is one of the woodland communities in the British National Vegetation Classification system; it is the only Yew woodland community in the NVC.

This is a very localised community. There are two subcommunities:

== Community composition ==
Only one constant species is found in this community, Yew (Taxus baccata).

A single rare species, European Box (Buxus sempervirens) is also associated with the community.

== Distribution ==
This community is almost wholly confined to chalk sites on the North and South Downs in southern England.

== Subcommunities ==
There are two subcommunities:

- the Sorbus aria subcommunity
- the Mercurialis perennis subcommunity
