= Woodland and scrub communities in the British National Vegetation Classification system =

UK plant community type

This article gives an overview of the woodland and scrub communities in the British National Vegetation Classification system.

== Introduction ==
The woodland and scrub communities of the NVC were described in Volume 1 of British Plant Communities, first published in 1991.

In total, 25 woodland/scrub communities have been identified, consisting of 19 woodland communities, four communities classed as scrub and 2 as underscrub.

The woodland communities consist of:

- Six mixed deciduous or oak/birch woodland communities, which between them are found throughout Britain
- Three Beech woodland communities, found mainly in southern England
- A Yew woodland community, almost completely restricted to southeast England (community W13)
- A Scots Pine woodland community, restricted to Scotland
- A Juniper woodland community (community W19)
- Seven wet woodland communities, characterised by the presence of alder, birch and willows (communities W1, W2, W3, W4, W5, W6 and W7).
- Communities of arctic-alpine willows

The scrub communities consist of:

- Communities consisting of shrubs such as hawthorn, blackthorn and elder
- Gorse and broom scrub

The underscrub communities consist of bramble and bracken underscrub.

A further scrub community, SD18, dominated by Sea Buckthorn, is classified among the sand-dune communities.

== List of woodland and scrub communities ==
The following is a list of the communities that make up this category:

- W1 Salix cinerea - Galium palustre woodland
- W2 Salix cinerea - Betula pubescens - Phragmites australis woodland
- W3 Salix pentandra - Carex rostrata woodland
- W4 Betula pubescens - Molinia caerulea woodland
- W5 Alnus glutinosa - Carex paniculata woodland
- W6 Alnus glutinosa - Urtica dioica woodland
- W7 Alnus glutinosa - Fraxinus excelsior - Lysimachia nemorum woodland
- W8 Fraxinus excelsior - Acer campestre - Mercurialis perennis woodland
- W9 Fraxinus excelsior - Sorbus aucuparia - Mercurialis perennis woodland
- W10 Quercus robur - Pteridium aquilinum - Rubus fruticosus woodland
- W11 Quercus petraea - Betula pubescens - Oxalis acetosella woodland
- W12 Fagus sylvatica - Mercurialis perennis woodland
- W13 Taxus baccata woodland
- W14 Fagus sylvatica - Rubus fruticosus woodland
- W15 Fagus sylvatica - Deschampsia flexuosa woodland
- W16 Quercus spp. - Betula spp. - Deschampsia flexuosa woodland
- W17 Quercus petraea - Betula pubescens - Dicranum majus woodland
- W18 Pinus sylvestris - Hylocomium splendens woodland
- W19 Juniperus communis ssp. communis - Oxalis acetosella woodland
- W20 Salix lapponum - Luzula sylvatica scrub
- W21 Crataegus monogyna - Hedera helix scrub
- W22 Prunus spinosa - Rubus fruticosus scrub
- W23 Ulex europaeus - Rubus fruticosus scrub
- W24 Rubus fruticosus - Holcus lanatus underscrub
- W25 Pteridium aquilinum - Rubus fruticosus underscrub

== Handbook ==
- National Vegetation Classification: Users' handbook - JNCC Open Data by JS Rodwell · 2006

== Other Websites ==
- NERC Open Research Archive
- The UK Woodland Assurance Standard (UKWAS) is an independent certification standard for verifying sustainable woodland management in the UK that is used for both Forest Stewardship Council® (FSC®) and the Programme for the Endorsement of Forest Certification (PEFC) certification.
- TREE SPECIES AND PROVENANCE

== See also ==
- John S. Rodwell
