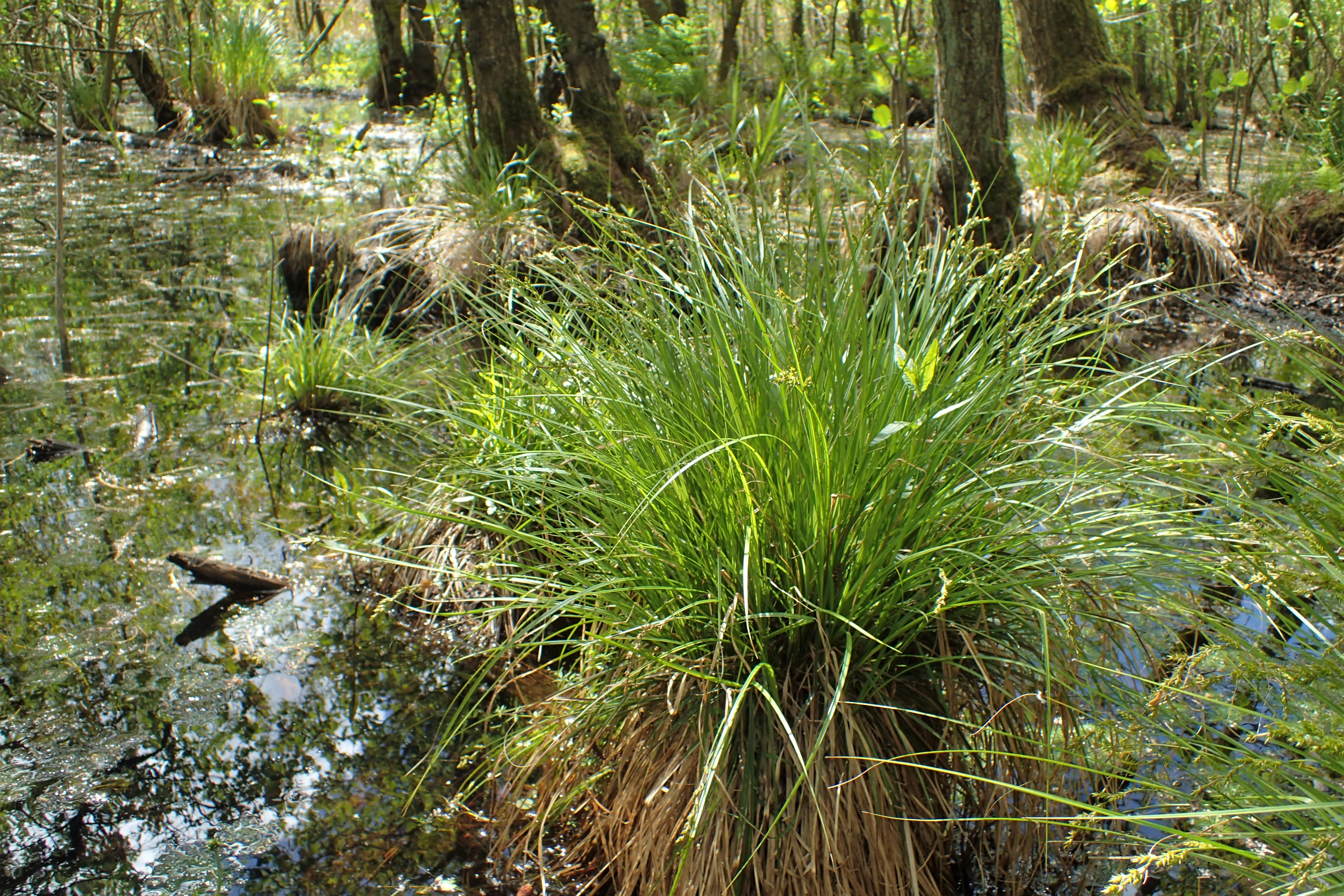
- In Poland

Scientific classification
- Kingdom: Plantae
- Clade: Tracheophytes
- Clade: Angiosperms
- Clade: Monocots
- Clade: Commelinids
- Order: Poales
- Family: Cyperaceae
- Genus: Carex
- Species: C. elongata

Binomial name
- Carex elongata L.

Synonyms
- List: Carex divergens Thuill.; Carex gebhardii Willd.; Carex multiceps Gaudin; Carex multiculmis Ehrh.; Carex pinnata Moench ex Rchb.; Caricina elongata (L.) St.-Lag.; Leptovignea elongata (L.) Fedde & J.Schust.; Olotrema gebhardii (Willd.) Raf.; Vignea elongata (L.) Rchb.; Vignea gebhardii (Willd.) Rchb.

= Carex elongata =

Species of flowering plant

Carex elongata, the elongated sedge, is a species of flowering plant in the family Cyperaceae, native to Europe, the Caucasus, western Siberia, Kazakhstan, and the Altai. It occurs in boggy woodland and wet meadows, where it forms dense tussocks up to about 1 m tall.

== Description ==
Plants occur in dense tussocks about 1 m tall and 50 cm in diameter, owing to their short rhizomes and dense production of shoots. Each trigonous stem is up to 80 cm long and rough with upward-pointing teeth on the edges. Leaves are up to 90 cm long and 5 mm wide, tapering to a fine point. The ligule, which is important for identification, is 8 mm long and sharply pointed. The inflorescence consists of up to 18 golden-tinged spikes which are fairly tightly spaced at the top of the stem. Fruits (utricles) are 4 mm long, with dark ribs, and have 2 stigmas. The diploid chromosome number (2n) = 56.

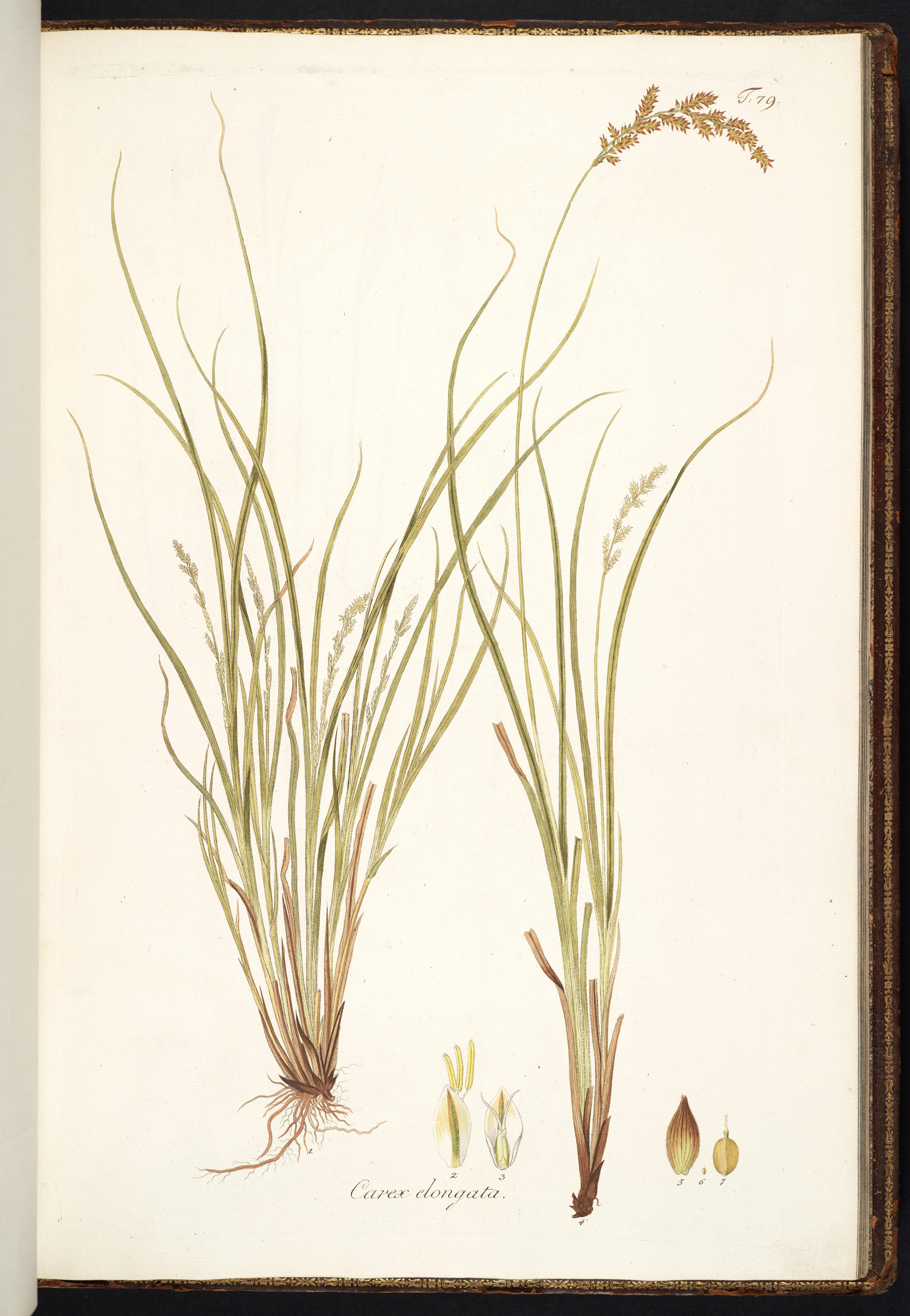
=Botanical illustration

== Ecology ==
This is a plant of flooded woodland, in Britain it is typically found in W5 alder carr, which typically occurs in river valleys and old peat bogs. It is thought that the seeds germinate on dead wood, which floats on the surface of the water, and thereby avoids inundation at the vulnerable seedling stage. In England, it used to grow on the rotten pilings of old canals, in similar conditions. It can also be found in W2 grey willow carr and W6 crack willow woodland.
