= British NVC community W17 =

UK plant community type

NVC community W17 (Quercus petraea - Betula pubescens - Dicranum majus woodland) is one of the woodland communities in the British National Vegetation Classification system. It is one of the six communities falling in the "mixed deciduous and oak/birch woodlands" group.

This is a widely distributed community in northern and western Britain and represents mossy deciduous woodland of the uplands. There are four subcommunities.

== Community composition ==
Two constant species are found in the tree canopy of this community:

- Sessile oak (Quercus petraea)
- Downy birch (Betula pubescens)

Eight constant species are found in the field and ground layers of this community:

- Wavy hair grass (Deschampsia flexuosa)
- Greater fork-moss (Dicranum majus)
- Glittering wood-moss (Hylocomium splendens)
- Waved silk-moss (Plagiothecium undulatum)
- Red-stemmed feather-moss (Pleurozium schreberi)
- Bank haircap moss (Polytrichum formosum)
- Little shaggy-moss (Rhytidiadelphus loreus)
- Blueberry (Vaccinium myrtillus)

Rare species associated with the community include Hymenophyllum wilsonii and a number of oceanic bryophytes.

== Distribution ==
This community is widespread throughout upland areas of Britain. The subcommunities show some geographical localisation with W17a predominantly western and W17d predominantly eastern.

== Subcommunities ==
There are four subcommunities:

- W17a : the Isothecium myosuroides-Diplophyllum albicans subcommunity
- W17b : the so-called typical subcommunity
- W17c : the Anthoxanthum odoratum-Agrostis capillaris subcommunity
- W17d : the Rhytidiadelphus triquetrus subcommunity
