= British NVC community W9 =

UK plant community type

NVC community W9 (Fraxinus excelsior - Sorbus aucuparia - Mercurialis perennis woodland) is one of the woodland communities in the British National Vegetation Classification system. It is one of the six communities falling in the "mixed deciduous and oak/birch woodlands" group.

This is a community of northern and western Britain, particularly widespread in Scotland and Wales. There are two subcommunities.

== Community composition ==
Ten constant species are found in this community:

- Ash (Fraxinus excelsior)
- Hazel (Corylus avellana)
- Male fern (Dryopteris filix-mas)
- Dog's-mercury (Mercurialis perennis)
- Wood-sorrel (Oxalis acetosella)
- Common dog-violet (Viola riviniana)
- Common feather-moss (Eurhynchium praelongum)
- Common striated feather-moss (Eurhynchium striatum)
- Hart's-tongue thyme-moss (Plagiomnium undulatum)
- Common tamarisk-moss (Thuidium tamariscinum)

The following rare species are also associated with the community:

- Baneberry (Actaea spicata)
- Lesser hairy-brome (Bromus benekenii)
- Northern hawk's-beard (Crepis mollis)
- Yellow star-of-Bethlehem (Gagea lutea)
- Whorled Solomon's-seal (Polygonatum verticillatum)

== Distribution ==
This community is widespread throughout upland areas in northern and western Britain, where is replaces community W8. It is particularly well represented in Scotland and Wales, and the far northern counties of England. It has also been recorded at a single site in Devon.

== Subcommunities ==
There are two subcommunities:

- the so-called "typical" subcommunity
- the Crepis paludosa subcommunity
