= British NVC community W4 =

National Vegetation Community in Britain

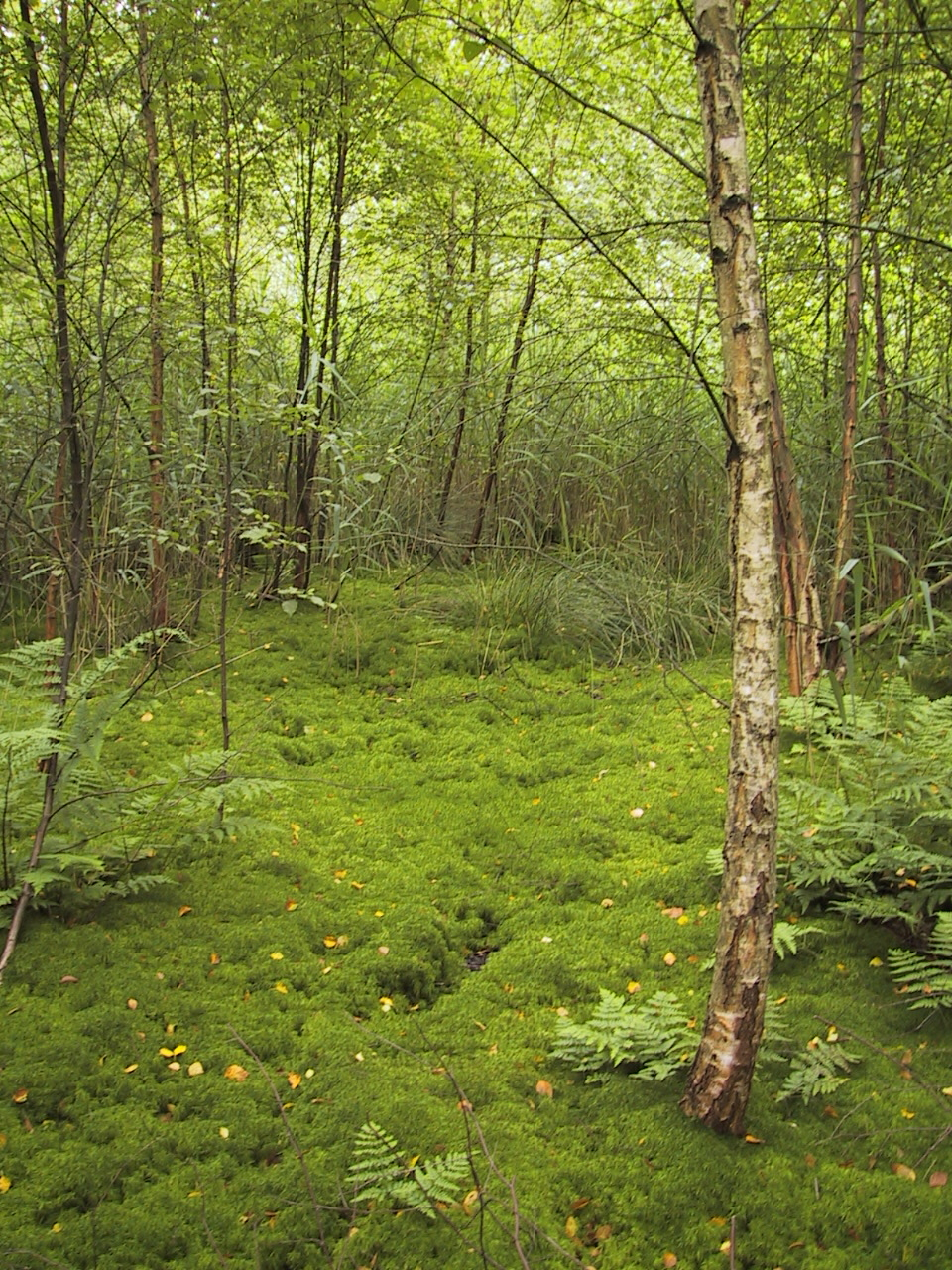
W4c birch woodland with a Sphagnum ground layer

NVC community W4 is one of the woodland communities in the British National Vegetation Classification system, characterised by a canopy of downy birch over a field layer of purple moor-grass or other calcifugous herbs on a peaty substrate. It usually forms as a secondary woodland over partially drained bogs or wet heaths.

== Description ==
W4 Betula pubescens-Molinia caerulea woodland is widely distributed, but rarely extensive, throughout the lowlands and the upland fringes of Britain. It occurs on moist, peaty, rather acidic soils, particularly on or around peat bogs that are drying out, usually as a result of drainage, although it can also be found on acidic mineral soils in suitable locations. Its characteristic (constant) species are downy birch (occasionally replaced by silver birch), purple moor-grass and various types of Sphagnum moss.

The habitat is typically a rather open woodland canopy, mainly of birch but often with some alder, willow and oak, with a typically sparse shrub layer that may contain some hawthorn and alder buckthorn. The field and ground layers are sometimes formed of either a lawn of Sphagnum or a taller sward of purple moor-grass or, on less moist soils, a dense cover of bracken. In the less common W4b subcommunity, various rushes and sedges are abundant. There are no tall trees in a W4 wood, as downy birch grows only to about 20 m and it is not long-lived, so there is usually an abundance of dead and decaying trees, giving the habitat a "moribund" look.

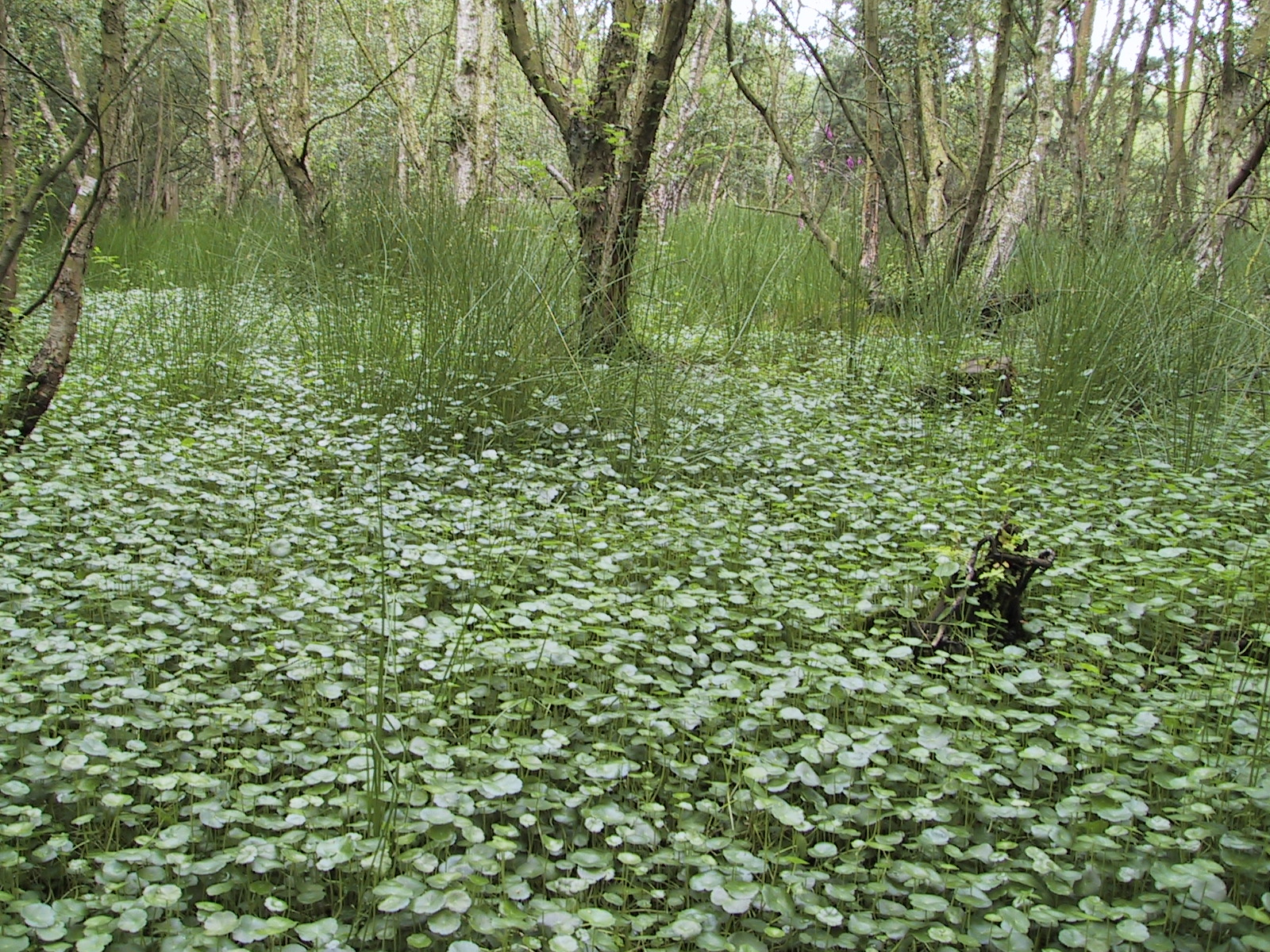
W4b woodland at Lin Can Moss, Shropshire, with a ground layer of Hydrocotyle vulgaris

Fungi are often abundant, with birch polypore on the rotting tree stumps and tawny grisettes and various types of Russula on the boggy ground.

The types of bog-moss that occur in the Sphagnum-dominated stands often reflect the conditions that were present before the tree cover. Sphagnum recurvum agg. (flat-topped bogmoss etc.), feathery bogmoss and red bogmoss suggest raised mires or schwingmoors, while blunt-leaved bogmoss and spiky bogmoss typically occur in places where there is some base-rich surface water. Fringed bogmoss is perhaps the most characteristic of W4 woodland, as it is shade tolerant and frequent here.

Birch woodland (usually W4 but sometimes W10 or W16) is often considered problematic on heathland nature reserves, particularly as the decomposing leaf litter can suppress the ground flora.

== Subcommunities ==
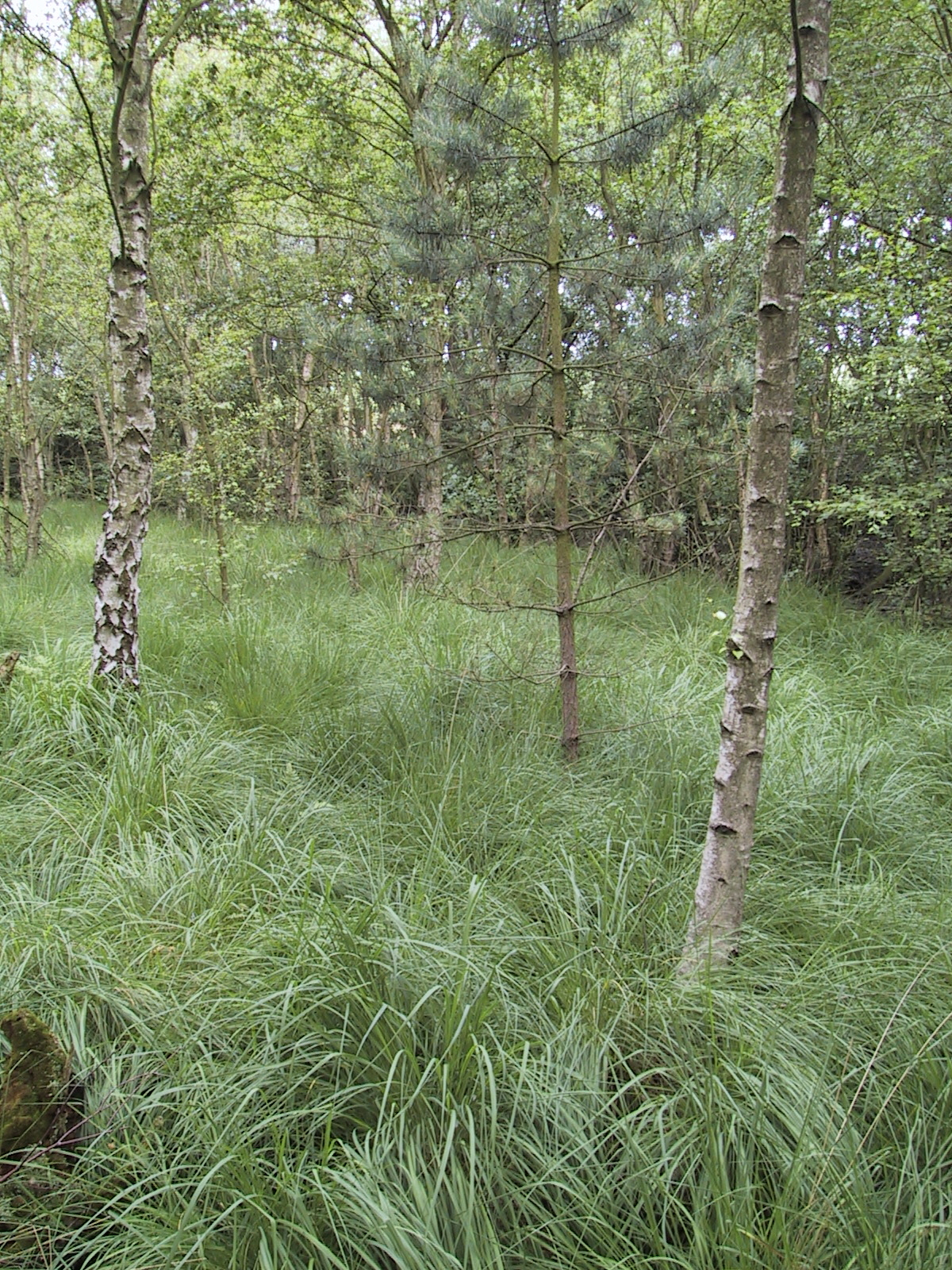
A field layer of purple moor-grass is characteristic of many woods.

There are three subcommunities:

- W4a Dryopteris dilatata – Rubus fruticosus subcommunity is a type with only patches of Sphagnum, if any, and a higher quantity of typical woodland shrubs such as bramble and honeysuckle, similar in some ways to W10 oak woodland. Woodwalton Fen and Malham Tarn are classic sites for this subcommunity.
- W4b Juncus effusus subcommunity has a wetter ground layer, with more abundant purple moor-grass and wetland plants such as soft rush and smooth-stalked sedge. There are sometimes patches of Sphagnum palustre and, in some stands, abundant pennywort.
- W4c Sphagnum spp. subcommunity is the more acid, oligotrophic variety, with abundant Sphagnum of various species (most characteristically, S. fimbriatum) combined with other bog plants such as cottongrass (Eriophorum spp.) and cranberry. Clarepool Moss is a locus classicus.

== Other treatments ==
Betula woodlands have long been recognised on the Continent, where the European Union lists several similar habitat types, the closest to W4 being EUNIS habitat G1.5 – Broadleaved swamp woodland on acid peat. Woodland very similar to W4 occurs on the peaty soils of lower Normandy and Brittany, where it is considered a wet pedunculate oak-birch woodland with characteristically fluctuating water levels.

In Britain, an important early study was by Duncan Poore at Woodwalton Fen in the 1950s. This showed how the birch had colonised the ground around Whittlesey Mere shortly after it had been drained, and the tree cover was fairly uniformly composed of 85 year-old specimens at the time of survey, dating the establishment of the wood to around 1865. In 1962 Sinker also described how birch woodland is part of the hydrosere around some of the meres in the Shropshire-Cheshire plain, forming a distinct band between the wet fen and the dry oak woodland beyond. At first this was thought to be a natural and fairly stable ecological feature, but later it was found to have been triggered by 19th century drainage operations, as at Woodwalton.

Acid woodlands, with varying proportions of birch, are more common in County Durham than in many other counties. A study by Gordon Graham in the 1970s and 1980s described two broad communities, WOC2 and WOC3, which encompass both upland and lowland birch woods, but they are not described as being significantly different to the more acid types of oak wood.
