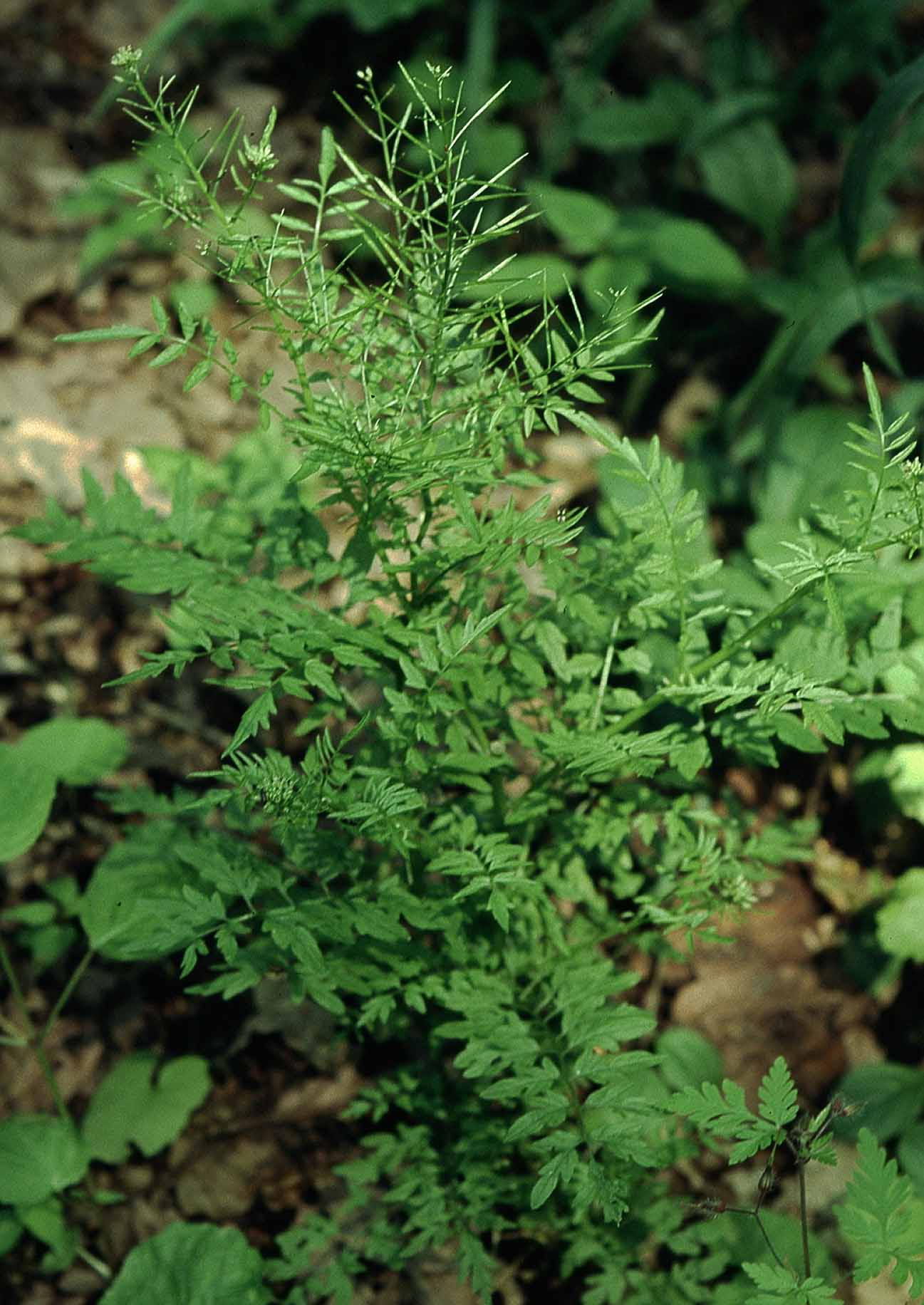

Scientific classification
- Kingdom: Plantae
- Clade: Tracheophytes
- Clade: Angiosperms
- Clade: Eudicots
- Clade: Rosids
- Order: Brassicales
- Family: Brassicaceae
- Genus: Cardamine
- Species: C. impatiens

Binomial name
- Cardamine impatiens L.

= Cardamine impatiens =

Species of flowering plant

Cardamine impatiens, the narrowleaf bittercress or narrow-leaved bitter-cress, is a plant species in the genus Cardamine of the family Brassicaceae. It is a slender, biennial herb, that produces sterile leaves in the first year, one to several flowering stems during the next. Its leaves are pinnate with several pairs of lanceolate, dentate leaflets and a terminal, slightly longer leaflet. The short petals surpass the calyx by half of its length. The seeds are arranged in one row on each side of the central membrane of the narrow pod and are ejected out in a shower due to the tension formed as the seed pod (silique) dries. It grows on walls, open ground in shady places in forests usually disturbed by human activity.

It is native to temperate Eurasia, ranging from Ireland and Spain to the Russian Far East.
