= British NVC community W1 =

Woodland community

NVC community W1 (Salix cinerea - Galium palustre woodland) is one of the woodland communities in the British National Vegetation Classification system; it is one of seven woodland communities in the NVC classed as "wet woodlands".

This is a community with a widely scattered distribution in the lowlands of Britain. There are no subcommunities.

== Community composition ==
Two constant species are found in this community, Grey Willow (Salix cinerea) and Common Marsh-bedstraw (Galium palustre).

One rare species, Tufted Loosestrife (Lysimachia thyrsiflora) is also associated with the community.

== Distribution ==
This community is widely distributed in the lowlands of Britain.
