= Wet woodland =

Biodiversity habitat in the United Kingdom

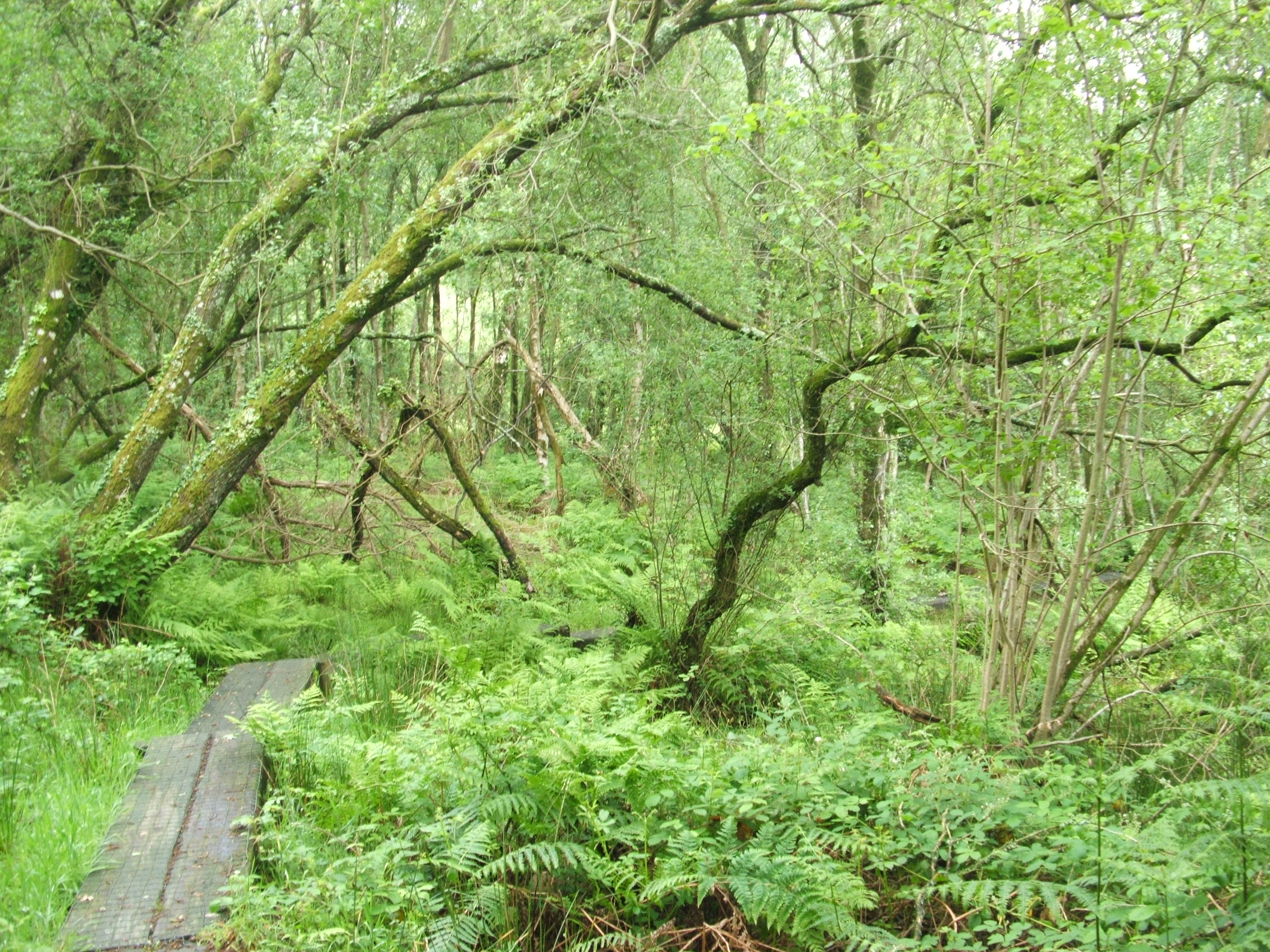
A wet woodland in Firebeacon, Devon

A wet woodland is a type of plant community. It is a biodiversity habitat in the United Kingdom as part of the British National Vegetation Classification system.

Wet woodlands occurs on poorly drained or seasonally wet soils. They may occur in river valleys, the surroundings of mires and raised bog, the transition zones between open water and drier ground, and beside small winding streams.

== British National Vegetation Classification ==
Within the British National Vegetation Classification, seven types of wet woodland are recognised as part of the Woodland and scrub communities in the British National Vegetation Classification system:

- W1. Grey sallow – marsh bedstraw woodland
- W2. Grey sallow – Downy birch – reed woodland
- W3. Bay willow – bottle sedge woodland
- W4. Downy birch – purple moor grass woodland
- W5. Alder – tussock sedge woodland
- W6. Alder – nettle woodland
- W7. (Alder-Ash-Yellow Pimpernell woodland)

=== Ecology ===
In the UK, alder, birches and willows are the characteristic trees found in this type of habitat, as they are able to extract oxygen from the water saturated habitat. The UK contains between 50–70,000 hectares (120–172,970 acres) of wet woodlands.

Wet woodland supports many types of species. E.g. the humidity favours bryophytes (mosses). The shrub and tree community supports many invertebrates: the beetles Melanopion minimum and Rhynchaenus testaceus, the craneflies Lipsothrix errans, Lipsothrix nervosa, and mammals such as Eurasian otters.

In the UK Woodland Maintenance and Restoration grants are available to protect this type of Woodland under Natural England's Environmental Stewardship Scheme.

=== Condition assessment and ideal management ===
- Native species are dominant. Non-native and invasive species account for less than 10% of the vegetation cover.
- A diverse age and height structure.
- Free from recent damage from stock or wild mammals - there should be evidence of tree regeneration e.g. seedlings, saplings and young trees.
- Standing and fallen dead trees of over 20 centimetres diameter are present.
- The area is protected from damage by agricultural and other adjacent operations.

The term 'recent' in this context means less than five years.

=== Example Wet Woodland sites ===
- Fire Beacon Hill in Devon, England
- Amberley Wild Brooks in West Sussex, England
- Wicken Fen in Cambridgeshire, England
