= British NVC community W7 =

UK plant community type

NVC community W7 (Alnus glutinosa - Fraxinus excelsior - Lysimachia nemorum woodland) is one of the woodland communities in the British National Vegetation Classification system; it is one of seven woodland communities in the NVC classed as "wet woodlands".

== Community composition ==
Alder is often not as abundant as in the previous types. Ash and/or silver birch are frequent with mixtures of common sallow, hazel and hawthorn in the shrub layer. Ground flora includes meadow sweet, yellow pimpernel, lady fern, rough stalked meadow grass, creeping soft grass, creeping buttercup and/or golden saxifrage. These are found on base rich flushes with gleyed mineral soils.

== Distribution ==
It is the commonest alder carr in upland woods; it does occur in the lowlands but often in a rather fragmentary fashion along streams.
