= List of rare species in the British National Vegetation Classification =

The following is a list of vascular plants, bryophytes and lichens which were regarded as rare species by the authors of British Plant Communities, together with the communities in which they occur.

== Vascular plants ==
- Man orchid (Aceras anthropophorum) CG2, CG3, CG5
- Baneberry (Actaea spicata) W9
- Bristle bent (Agrostis curtisii) H2, H3, H4, H5, H6
- Ground-pine (Ajuga chamaepitys) CG2, OV15
- The lady's-mantle Alchemilla filicaulis ssp. filicaulis CG10
- The lady's-mantle Alchemilla acutiloba MG3
- The lady's-mantle Alchemilla glomerulans MG3
- The lady's-mantle Alchemilla monticola MG3
- The lady's-mantle Alchemilla subcrenata MG3
- The lady's-mantle Alchemilla wichurae MG3, CG10
- Babington's leek (Allium ampeloprasum var. babingtonii) OV6
- Chives (Allium schoenoprasum) H6, H7, MC5
- Three-cornered garlic (Allium triquetrum) OV24
- Bog-rosemary (Andromeda polifolia) M2
- Annual vernal-grass (Anthoxanthum aristatum) OV1
- Loose silky-bent (Apera spica-venti) OV5
- Bristol rock-cress (Arabis stricta) CG1
- Field wormwood (Artemisia campestris) CG7
- Goldilocks aster (Aster linosyris) CG1
- Purple milk-vetch (Astragalus danicus) H7, CG2, CG3, CG4, CG5, CG7, SD11, SD12, MC10, MC5
- Wild cabbage (Brassica oleracea) OV41, MC4, MC5
- Lesser quaking-grass (Briza minor) OV1, OV2, OV6
- Lesser hairy brome (Bromus benekenii) W9
- Great pignut (Bunium bulbocastanum) CG2
- Small hare's-ear (Bupleurum baldense) CG1
- European box (Buxus sempervirens) W13
- Narrow small-reed (Calamagrostis stricta) S1
- Narrow-leaved bittercress (Cardamine impatiens) W8
- Fibrous tussock-sedge (Carex appropinquata) W3
- Hair sedge (Carex capillaris) CG10
- String sedge (Carex chordorrhiza) M4
- Lesser tussock-sedge (Carex diandra) W3
- Elongated sedge (Carex elongata) W2
- Rare spring-sedge (Carex ericetorum) CG2, CG5, CG7
- Dwarf sedge (Carex humilis) CG1, CG2, CG3
- Tall bog-sedge (Carex magellanica) M2
- Soft-leaved sedge (Carex montana) H4, CG2, CG10
- Rock sedge (Carex rupestris) CG10
- Common centaury (Centaurium erythraea var. capitatum) MC5
- Dwarf mouse-ear (Cerastium pumilum) CG1, CG2
- Tuberous thistle (Cirsium tuberosum) MG5, CG2
- Coralroot orchid (Corallorrhiza trifida) W3
- Grey hair-grass (Corynephorus canescens) SD11
- Sea-kale (Crambe maritima) SD1
- Northern hawk's-beard (Crepis mollis) W9
- Mezereon (Daphne mezereum) W8
- Yellow whitlowgrass (Draba aizoides) CG1, OV41
- Hoary whitlowgrass (Draba incana) CG10
- Crested buckler-fern (Dryopteris cristata) W2
- The fern Dryopteris × uliginosa, the hybrid of crested buckler-fern and narrow buckler-fern (D. carthusiana) W2
- Dorset heath (Erica ciliaris) H3, H4
- Cornish heath (Erica vagans) H4, H5, H6, H7
- Musk stork's-bill (Erodium moschatum) OV14
- Portland spurge (Euphorbia portlandica) H7, CG1
- The eyebright Euphrasia pseudokerneri CG2
- Wood fescue (Festuca altissima) W8
- Snake's-head fritillary (Fritillaria meleagris) MG4
- Tall ramping-fumitory (Fumaria bastardii) OV6, OV11, OV13
- Yellow star-of-Bethlehem (Gagea lutea) W9
- Wall bedstraw (Galium parisiense) CG7
- Slender bedstraw (Galium pumilum) CG2, CG5
- Limestone bedstraw (Galium sterneri) CG2, CG10
- Early gentian (Gentianella anglica) CG1, CG2
- Chiltern gentian (Gentianella germanica) CG2
- Hairy greenweed (Genista pilosa)) H2, H7, MC5
- Bog orchid (Hammarbya paludosa) M1
- White rock-rose (Helianthemum apenninum) CG1
- Hoary rock-rose (Helianthemum canum) CG1
- The hybrid between white and hoary rock-roses Helianthemum × sulfureum CG1
- Musk orchid (Herminium monorchis) CG2, CG4, CG5
- Fringed rupturewort (Herniaria ciliolata) H7, MC5
- Lizard orchid (Himantoglossum hircinum) CG7
- Hutchinsia (Hornungia petraea) CG7, OV39
- Spotted cat's-ear (Hypochoeris maculata) CG1, CG2, CG3
- Wild candytuft (Iberis amara) CG2
- Land quillwort (Isoetes histrix) H7
- Dwarf rush (Juncus capitatus) H6
- Somerset hair-grass (Koeleria vallesiana) CG1
- Rock sea-lavender (Limonium recurvum) MC1
- Perennial flax (Linum perenne subsp. anglicum) CG2, CG3
- Hairy bird's-foot trefoil (Lotus hispidus) MC5
- Tufted loosestrife (Lysimachia thyrsiflora) W1, W3, M4
- Bur medick (Medicago minima) CG7
- Sickle medick (Medicago falcata) CG7
- Toothed medick (Medicago polymorpha) OV14
- Sand lucerne (Medicago sativa ssp. varia) CG7
- Oysterplant (Mertensia maritima) SD3
- Early sand-grass (Mibora minima) SD19, MC5
- Fine-leaved sandwort (Minuartia hybrida) CG7
- Spring sandwort (Minuartia verna) H7, CG10, MC5
- Alpine forget-me-not (Myosotis alpestris) CG10
- Dwarf cudweed (Omalotheca supina) CG10
- Small restharrow (Ononis reclinata) MC5
- Late spider-orchid (Ophrys fuciflora) CG2
- Early spider-orchid (Ophrys sphegodes) CG2, MC4
- Monkey orchid (Orchis simia) CG2
- Burnt orchid (Orchis ustulata) CG2
- Orange bird's-foot (Ornithopus pinnatus) MC5
- Oxtongue broomrape (Orobanche picridis) CG2
- Purple oxytropis (Oxytropus halleri) MC10
- Curved hard-grass (Parapholis incurva) MC1
- Milk-parsley (Peucedanum palustre) W2
- Purple-stem cat's-tail (Phleum phleoides) CG7
- Round-headed rampion (Phyteuma tenerum) CG2, CG3, CG5
- Bulbous meadow-grass (Poa bulbosa) MC5
- Early meadow-grass (Poa infirma) MC5
- Jacob's-ladder (Polemonium caeruleum) MG2
- Four-leaved allseed (Polycarpon tetraphyllum) MC5
- Dwarf milkwort (Polygala amara) CG2
- Chalk milkwort (Polygala calcarea) CG2, CG3, CG5
- Whorled Solomon's-seal (Polygonatum verticillatum) W9
- Ray's knotgrass (Polygonum oxyspermum ssp. raii) SD2, SD3
- Holly fern (Polystichum lonchitis) OV40
- Spring cinquefoil (Potentilla neumanniana) CG1, CG7
- Oxlip (Primula elatior) W8
- Primula × digenea, the hybrid between oxlip and primrose (P. vulgaris) W8
- Scottish primrose (Primula scotica) H7, MC10
- Pasqueflower (Pulsatilla vulgaris) CG2, CG3, CG5
- Round-leaved wintergreen (Pyrola rotundifolia) W2, W3
- Brown beak-sedge (Rhynchospora fusca) M1
- Mountain currant (Ribes alpinum) W8
- Sand crocus (Romulea columnae) MC5
- Alpine pearlwort (Sagina saginoides) CG10
- Dwarf willow (Salix herbacea) CG10
- Dark-leaved willow (Salix myrsinifolia) W3
- Meadow clary (Salvia pratensis) CG2
- Perennial glasswort (Sarcocornia perennis) SM10
- Shepherd's-needle (Scandix pecten-veneris) OV15
- Rannoch-rush (Scheuchzeria palustris) M1
- Autumn squill (Scilla autumnalis) H7, CG1, MC5
- Spring squill (Scilla verna) H5, H6, H7, MC10, CG1, MC5, MC12
- Rock stonecrop (Sedum forsterianum) CG1
- Silver ragwort (Senecio cineraria) CG1
- Field fleawort (Senecio integrifolius ssp. integrifolius) CG2, CG3, MC5
- Moon carrot (Seseli libanotis) CG2
- Sibbaldia (Sibbaldia procumbens) CG10
- Sand catchfly (Silene conica) CG7
- Small-flowered catchfly (Silene gallica) OV2, OV6
- Night-flowering catchfly (Silene noctiflora) OV16
- Nottingham catchfly (Silene nutans) MG1, CG2, OV41, OV39, MC4
- Spanish catchfly (Silene otites) CG7
- London-rocket (Sisymbrium irio) OV14
- Autumn ladies'-tresses (Spiranthes spiralis) CG2, H7
- The dandelion Taraxacum fulgidum MG4
- The dandelion Taraxacum haematicum MG4
- The dandelion Taraxacum melanthoides MG4
- The dandelion Taraxacum sublaeticolor MG4
- The dandelion Taraxacum subundulatum MG4
- The dandelion Taraxacum tamesense MG4
- Cut-leaved germander (Teucrium botrys) CG2
- Marsh fern (Thelypteris palustris) W2
- Bastard toadflax (Thesium humifusum) CG2, CG3, CG5
- Breckland thyme (Thymus serpyllum) CG7
- Large thyme (Thymus pulegioides) CG2, CG3, CG5
- Large-leaved lime (Tilia platyphyllos) W8
- Scottish asphodel (Tofieldia pusilla) CG10
- Twin-headed clover (Trifolium bocconei) H6, H7
- Western clover (Trifolium occidentale) H7, MC10, MC5
- Suffocated clover (Trifolium suffocatum) MC5, OV2
- Intermediate bladderwort (Utricularia intermedia) M1
- Spiked speedwell (Veronica spicata) CG1, CG2, CG7
- Fingered speedwell (Veronica triphyllos) OV3
- Spring speedwell (Veronica verna) CG7
- Pale dog-violet (Viola lactea) H3
- Dune fescue (Vulpia membranacea) SD19
- Alpine woodsia (Woodsia alpina) OV40

== Bryophytes ==
=== Mosses ===
- Side-fruited crisp-moss Pleurochaete squarrosa CG7
- Curving feather-moss Scorpiurium circinatum CG1
- Golden bog-moss Sphagnum pulchrum M1, M2
- Neat crisp-moss Tortella nitida CG1

=== Liverworts ===
- Greater pawwort Barbilophozia lycopodioides U6

== Lichens ==
- Bacidia muscorum CG7
- Buellia epigaea CG7
- Diploschistes scruposus var. bryophilus CG7
- Fulgensia fulgens CG7
- Lecidea decipiens CG7
- Squamaria lentigera CG7
- Toximia caerulea var. nigricans CG7
- Toximia lobulata CG7
