= British NVC community CG2 =

UK plant community type

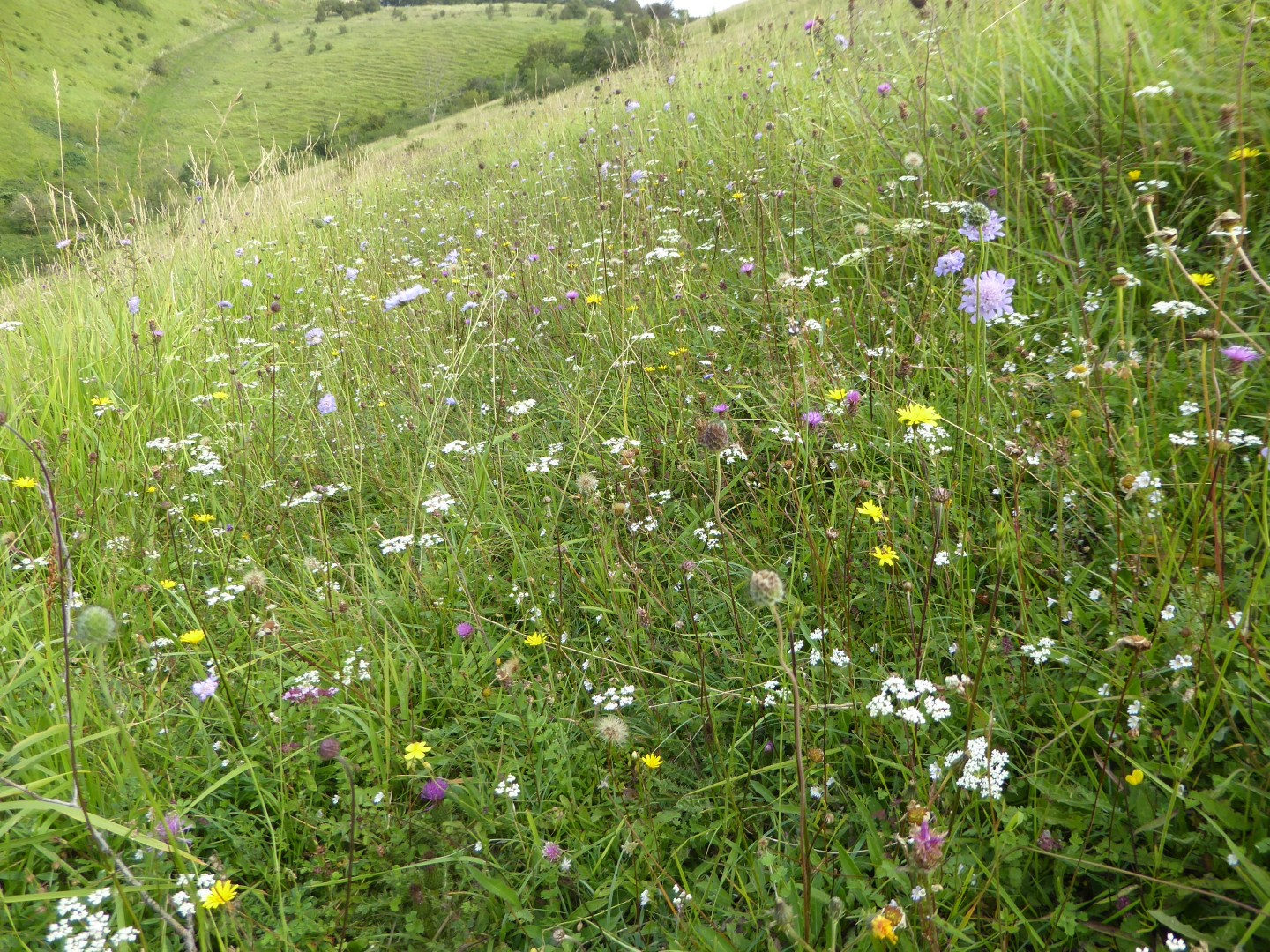
CG2 Festuca ovina grassland at Wye Downs NNR, Kent

NVC community CG2 Festuca ovina-Avenula pratensis grassland is one of the calcicolous grassland communities in the British National Vegetation Classification system, characterised by a species-rich pasture of grasses and forbs growing in thin soil over chalk or limestone. It is one of three short-sward communities associated with heavy grazing, within the lowland calcicolous grassland group, and is regarded as "typical" chalk grassland.

== Description ==
CG2 Festuca ovina-Avenula pratensis grassland is perhaps the most typical community in ancient sheep and rabbit-grazed pasture on calcareous soils in England and Wales. The finest examples are closely cropped with a short, rather patchy sward and many dicotyledonous herbs present, often exceeding the grasses in abundance. This vegetation has developed over hundreds or even thousands of years of intensive grazing, and many stands in Britain are currently undergoing gradual change as reduction of stocking levels allows the more vigorous species to thrive.

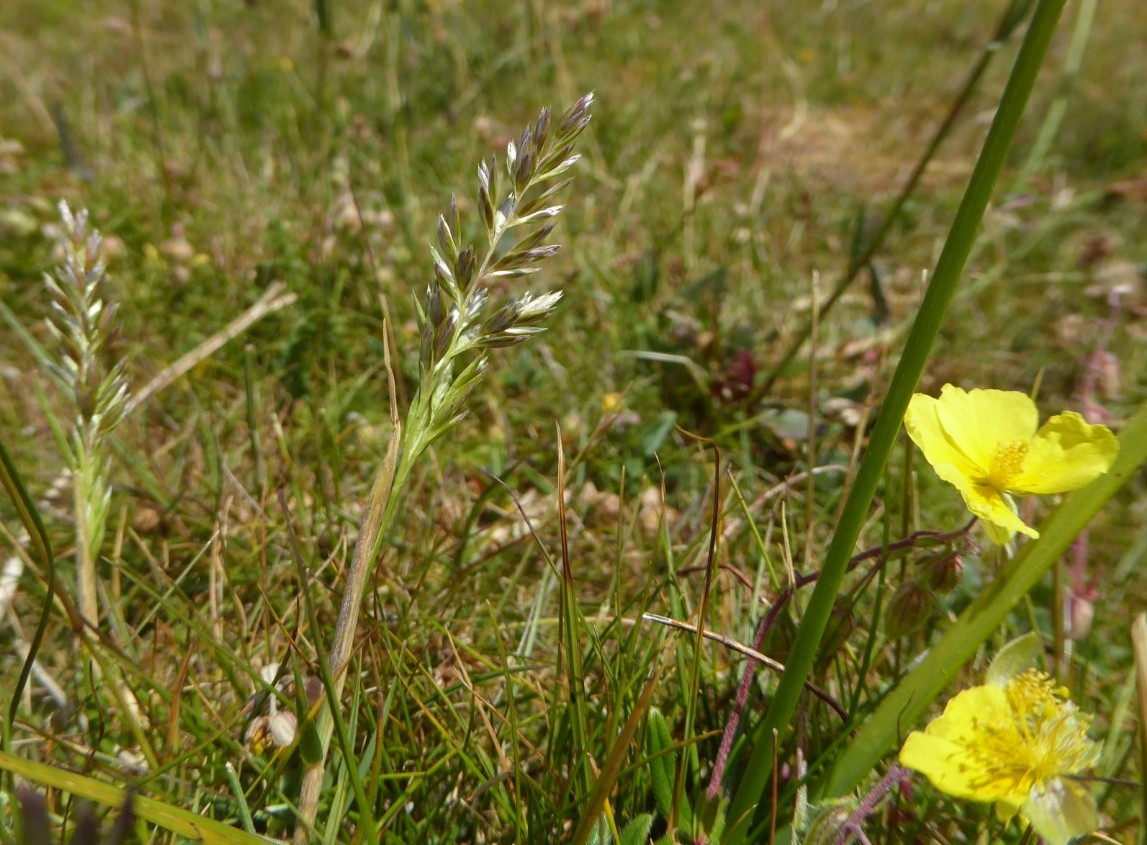
Crested hair-grass is characteristic of CG2 grassland

In a traditional CG2 grassland sheep's-fescue is the most abundant grass, often with some meadow oatgrass, quaking grass and crested hair-grass. Red fescue and downy oatgrass are also present in smaller quantities, as are tor grass, upright brome and false oatgrass. Increasing proportions of these latter five grasses indicate transitions to other grassland types, i.e. MG5, CG6, CG4, CG3 and MG1, respectively. Glaucous sedge is often as abundant as any grass, and spring sedge is usually present.

Among the many herbs that can be found, salad burnet, thyme (sometimes both wild thyme and large thyme), mouse-ear hawkweed common rock-rose and dwarf thistle are highly characteristic. In southern parts of Britain, bastard toadflax, squinancywort and horseshoe vetch occur in this community at the limits of their range. Meadows of CG2 are also well-known for containing anthills of the yellow meadow ant, which provide a distinctive niche for certain species of plant that are absent from the general sward.

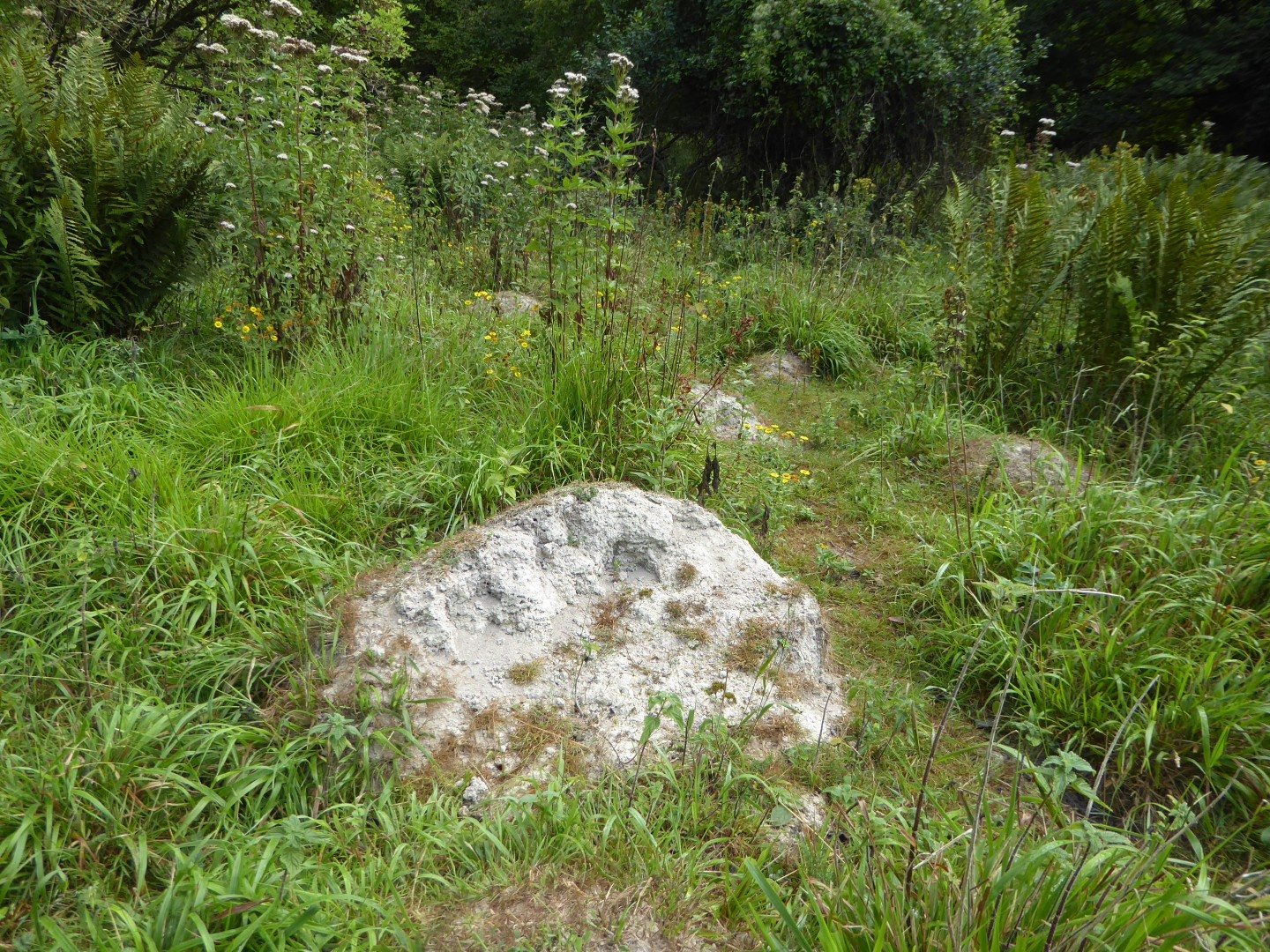
Anthills can outlast the meadow as it succeeds to scrub.

CG2 grassland is largely confined to the warmer, drier lowlands with summer maximum temperatures above 26 °C and under 160 wet days each year. The soil is typically a free-draining rendzina with bedrock very near the surface. It has a pH between 7 and 8 and is deficient (oligotrophic) in two of the three major nutrients, nitrogen and phosphorus - although, of course calcium (or magnesium in the north) is abundant. Most of the calcareous rock formations in England and Wales support some areas of CG2 grassland, including the North and South Downs, the carboniferous limestones of North and South Wales, Derbyshire, the Mendips, the Dorset, Wiltshire and Yorkshire chalk, the Corallian limestone of the North York Moors and the Magnesian limestone in Co. Durham.

== Conservation ==
Under the Habitats Regulations, CG2 grassland is considered a subset of habitat 6210 Semi-natural dry grasslands and scrubland facies on calcareous substrates. As such, it is protected in the UK by the designation of Special Areas of Conservation (SACs), which include Butser Hill, Castle Hill, Cerne and Sydling Downs, Folkestone to Etchinghill Escarpment, Great Orme, Hartslock, the Isle of Portland, Isle of Wight Downs, Lewes Downs, the Mendips, Mole Gap to Reigate Escarpment, the Peak District, Pewsey Downs and Wye and Crundale Downs.

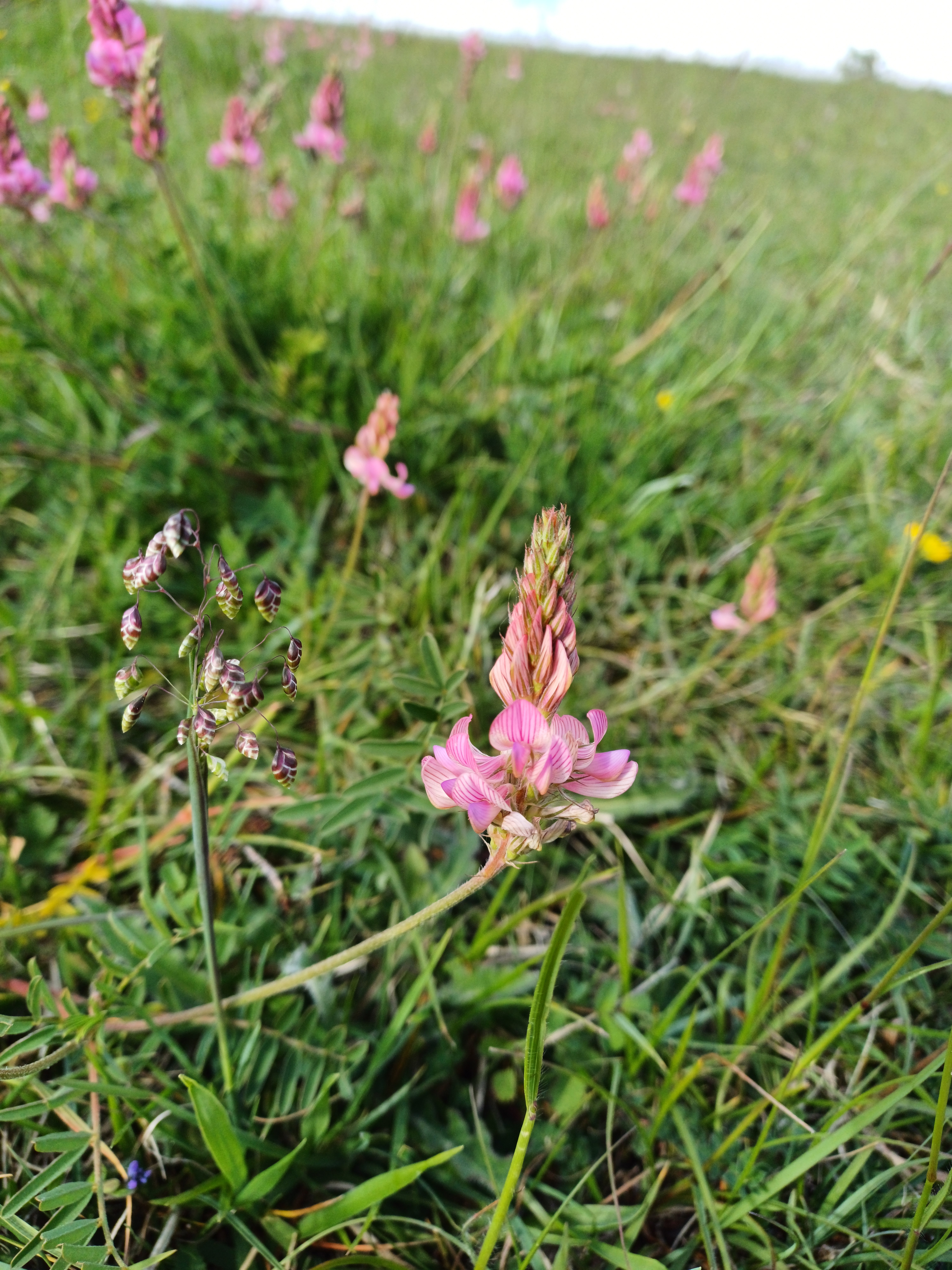
A small, possibly native, form of sainfoin grows in CG2 meadows.

The following rare species are also associated with the community:

- Man Orchid (Aceras anthropophorum)
- Ground-pine (Ajuga chamaepitys)
- Purple Milk-vetch (Astragalus danicus)
- Great Pignut (Bunium bulbocastanum)
- Rare Spring Sedge (Carex ericetorum)
- Dwarf Sedge (Carex humilis)
- Soft-leaved Sedge (Carex montana)
- Large-fruited Prickly-sedge (Carex muricata subsp. muricata)
- Dwarf Mouse-ear (Cerastium pumilum)
- Tuberous Thistle (Cirsium tuberosum)
- Chalk Eyebright (Euphrasia pseudokerneri)
- Slender Bedstraw (Galium pumilum)
- Limestone Bedstraw (Galium sterneri)
- Early Gentian (Gentianella anglica)
- Chiltern Gentian (Gentianella germanica)
- Musk Orchid (Herminium monorchis)
- Spotted Cat's-ear (Hypochaeris maculata)
- Wild Candytuft (Iberis amara)
- Perennial Flax (Linum perenne subsp. anglicum)
- Late Spider-orchid (Ophrys fuciflora)
- Early Spider-orchid (Ophrys sphegodes)
- Monkey Orchid (Orchis simia)
- Burnt Orchid (Orchis ustulata)
- Broomrape (Orobanche picridis)
- Round-headed Rampion (Phyteuma tenerum)
- Dwarf Milkwort (Polygala amara)
- Chalk Milkwort (Polygala calcarea)
- Pasqueflower (Pulsatilla vulgaris)
- Meadow Clary (Salvia pratensis)
- Field Fleawort (Senecio integrifolius subsp. integrifolius)
- Moon Carrot (Seseli libanotis)
- Nottingham Catchfly (Silene nutans)
- Autumn Ladies'-tresses (Spiranthes spiralis)
- Cut-leaved Germander (Teucrium botrys)
- Bastard-toadflax (Thesium humifusum)
- Large Thyme (Thymus pulegioides)
- Spiked Speedwell (Veronica spicata)

== Subcommunities ==
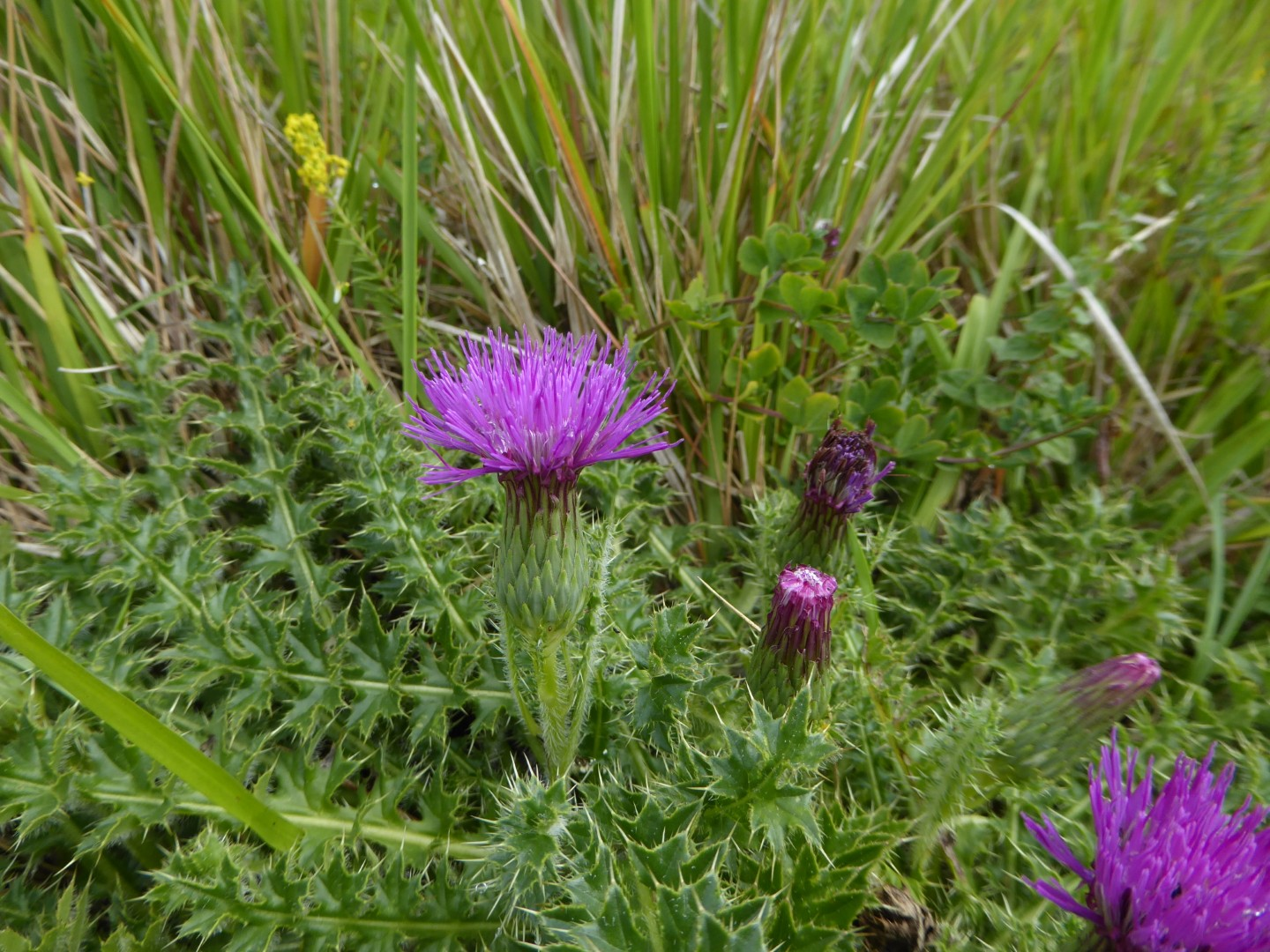
Dwarf thistle is a characteristic plant of CG2.

There are four subcommunities, one of which is subdivided into three variants:

- CG2a Cirsium acaule - Asperula cynanchica subcommunity is the classic 'chalk grassland' of southern England, with a short, closely-cropped sward dominated by sheep's fescue and containing up to 25 species (sometimes even more) in each square metre of turf. It is also the type most likely to harbour the Continental rarities that are so characteristic of CG2. It can be further divided into three variants:
  - CG2ai Filipendula vulgaris - Helianthemum nummularium is distinctive for the increased abundance of the two named species, but otherwise occurs in similar places
  - CG2aii typical variant is as described above
  - CG2aiii Pseudoscleropodium purum - Prunella vulgaris is a more mossy vegetation of damp soils or higher humidity, with a range of bryophytes including Homalothecium lutescens, Ctenidium molluscum, Rhytidiadelphus triquetrus and Hylocomium splendens.
- CG2b Succisa pratensis - Leucanthemum vulgare occurs in the west country and contains some rarities such as Carex humilis and Thesium humifusum
- CG2c Holcus lanatus - Trifolium repens is found on rather less calcareous soils and lacks most of the community rarities
- CG2d Dicranum scoparium is a northern variant which occurs over limestone rather than chalk and often has an abundance of Brachypodium sylvaticum. Its rarities include Galium sterneri and Astragalus danicus.

== Other treatments ==
Under the Habitats Directive (Habitats Regulations in the UK), CG2 grassland is considered a type of habitat 6210 Semi-natural dry grasslands and scrubland facies on calcareous substrates, which is the most species-rich type of lowland vegetation in Europe, but it covers a wide range of vegetation communities.

The current habitats classification system used in the European Union is EUNIS, under which CG2 grassland is E1.2616 Southern Britannic dry calcicolous grasslands, which corresponds at least to all the CG2-CG6 communities, and possibly to any of CG2-CG10 in the NVC. The NVC is unusual in separating some of these vegetation types, based largely on the dominant grasses, and it can be difficult to assign stands to one or another in some situations. Within the more general EUNIS habitat E1.26 Sub-Atlantic semi-dry calcareous grassland, the communities dominated by tor grass or upright brome are considered to be mere variations of the habitat caused by the level of grazing or cutting.
