= British NVC community CG1 =

UK plant community type

NVC community CG1 (Festuca ovina - Carlina vulgaris grassland) is one of the calcicolous grassland communities in the British National Vegetation Classification system. It is one of three short-sward communities associated with heavy grazing, within the lowland calcicolous grassland group, and is regarded as the south-west coastal counterpart of "typical" chalk grassland (community CG2).

It is a comparatively localised community. There are six subcommunities.

== Community composition ==
The following constant species are found in this community:

- Carline Thistle Carlina vulgaris
- Cock's-foot Dactylis glomerata
- Sheep's Fescue (Festuca ovina)
- Mouse-ear Hawkweed (Hieracium pilosella)
- Common Bird's-foot Trefoil (Lotus corniculatus)
- Ribwort Plantain (Plantago lanceolata)
- Salad Burnet (Sanguisorba minor)
- Wild Thyme (Thymus praecox)

The following rare species are also associated with the community:

- Bristol Rock-cress Arabis stricta
- Goldilocks Aster Aster linosyris
- Small Hare's-ear Bupleurum baldense
- Dwarf Sedge Carex humilis
- Dwarf Mouse-ear Cerastium pumilum
- Yellow Whitlowgrass Draba aizoides
- Portland Spurge Euphorbia portlandica
- Early Gentian Gentianella anglica
- White Rock-rose Helianthemum apenninum
- Hoary Rock-rose Helianthemum canum
- the hybrid between White and Hoary Rock-roses Helianthemum × sulfureum
- Spotted Cat's-ear Hypochoeris maculata
- Somerset Hair-grass Koeleria vallesiana
- Spring Cinquefoil Potentilla tabernaemontani
- Autumn Squill Scilla autumnalis
- Spring Squill Scilla verna
- Rock Stonecrop Sedum forsterianum
- Silver Ragwort Senecio cineraria
- Spiked Speedwell Veronica spicata
- Curving Feather-moss Scorpiurium circinatum
- Neat Crisp-moss Tortella nitida

== Distribution ==
This community is found in scattered locations on limestone sites around the south and west coasts of Britain.

== Subcommunities ==
There are six subcommunities:

- the Carex humilis subcommunity
- the Scilla autumnalis - Euphorbia portlandica subcommunity
- the Trinia glauca subcommunity
- the Helianthemum canum subcommunity
- the Koeleria macrantha subcommunity
- the Festuca rubra - Scilla verna subcommunity
