= British NVC community CG7 =

UK plant community type

NVC community CG7 (Festuca ovina - Hieracium pilosella - Thymus praecox/pulegioides grassland) is one of the calcicolous grassland communities in the British National Vegetation Classification system. It is one of three short-sward communities associated with heavy grazing, within the lowland calcicolous grassland group, and is regarded as the eastern counterpart of "typical" chalk grassland (community CG2).

It is a comparatively widely distributed community. There are five subcommunities.

== Community composition ==
The following constant species are found in this community:

- Sheep's Fescue (Festuca ovina)
- Mouse-ear Hawkweed (Hieracium pilosella)
- Rough Hawkbit (Leontodon hispidus)
- Wild Thyme (Thymus praecox) / Large Thyme (T. pulegioides)
- Cypress-leaved Plait-moss (Hypnum cupressiforme)

The following rare species are also associated with the community:

- Field Wormwood (Artemisia campestris)
- Purple Milk-vetch (Astragalus danicus)
- Rare Spring-sedge (Carex ericetorum)
- Wall Bedstraw (Galium parisiense)
- Lizard Orchid (Himantoglossum hircinum)
- Hutchinsia (Hornungia petraea)
- Bur Medick (Medicago minima)
- Sickle Medick (Medicago falcata)
- Sand Lucerne (Medicago sativa ssp. varia)
- Fine-leaved Sandwort (Minuartia hybrida)
- Purple-stem Cat's-tail (Phleum phleoides)
- Spring Cinquefoil (Potentilla neumanniana)
- Sand Catchfly (Silene conica)
- Spanish Catchfly (Silene otites)
- Breckland Thyme (Thymus serpyllum)
- Spiked Speedwell (Veronica spicata)
- Spring Speedwell (Veronica verna)
- Side-fruited Crisp-moss Pleurochaeta squarrosa
- the lichen Bacidia muscorum
- the lichen Buellia epigaea
- the lichen Diploschistes scrupsos var. bryophilus
- the lichen Fulgensia fulgens
- the lichen Lecidea decipiens
- the lichen Squamaria lentigera
- the lichen Toximia caerulea var. nigricans
- the lichen Toximia lobulata

== Distribution ==
This community is found scattered throughout chalk grassland sites in southern England, particularly in The Brecks on the Norfolk/Suffolk border, with outlying clusters in the Yorkshire Wolds (also on chalk), and on Carboniferous limestone in Derbyshire and Mendip Hills.

== Subcommunities ==
There are five subcommunities:

- the Koeleria macrantha subcommunity
- the Cladonia spp. subcommunity
- the Ditrichum flexicaule - Diploschistes scruposus var. bryophilus subcommunity
- the Fragaria vesca - Erigeron acer subcommunity
- the Medicago lupulina - Rumex acetosa subcommunity
