= British NVC community OV6 =

UK plant community type

British NVC community OV6 (Cerastium glomeratum - Fumaria muralis ssp. boraei community) is one of the open habitat communities in the British National Vegetation Classification system. It is one of six arable weed and track-side communities of light, less-fertile acid soils.

It is a widespread community. There are no subcommunities.

== Community composition ==
The following constant species are found in this community:

- Scarlet pimpernel (Anagallis arvensis)
- Sticky mouse-ear (Cerastium glomeratum)
- Common ramping-fumitory (Fumaria muralis ssp. boraei)
- Toad rush (Juncus bufonius)
- Annual meadow-grass (Poa annua)
- Groundsel (Senecio vulgaris)
- Prickly sow-thistle (Sonchus asper)

Four rare species are associated with the community:

- Babington's leek (Allium babingtonii)
- Lesser quaking-grass (Briza minor)
- Tall ramping-fumitory (Fumaria bastardii)
- Small-flowered catchfly (Silene gallica)

== Distribution ==
This community is confined to disturbed, fertile, light soils in the damper oceanic climate of south-west England. It is found only in The Scillies and south-west Cornwall. It is closely associated with the Briza minor - Silene gallica community, which often replaces it on drier soils.

== Subcommunities ==
There are three subcommunities:

- the Aphanes microcarpa - Ranunculus muricatus subcommunity
- the Valerianella locusta - Barbula convoluta subcommunity
- the Vicia hirsuta - Papaver dubium subcommunity
