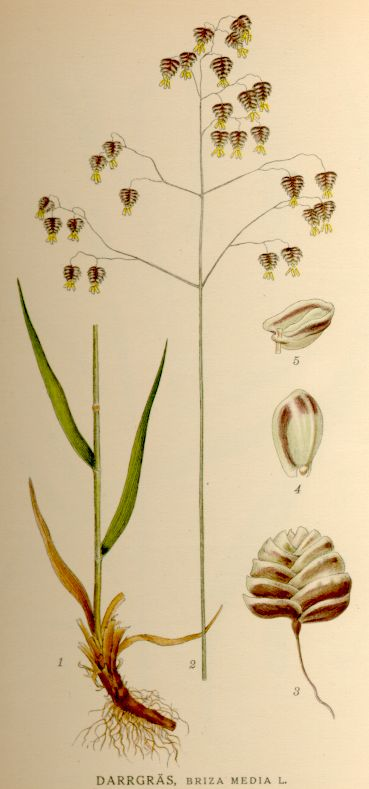

Scientific classification
- Kingdom: Plantae
- Clade: Embryophytes
- Clade: Tracheophytes
- Clade: Spermatophytes
- Clade: Angiosperms
- Clade: Monocots
- Clade: Commelinids
- Order: Poales
- Family: Poaceae
- Subfamily: Pooideae
- Genus: Briza
- Species: B. media

Binomial name
- Briza media L.

= Briza media =

Species of grass

Briza media is a perennial grass in the family Poaceae and is a species of the genus Briza.

Common names include quaking grass, common quaking grass, cow-quake, didder, dithering grass, dodder grass, doddering dillies, doddle grass, earthquakes, jiggle-joggles, jockey grass, lady's hair, maidenhair grass, pearl grass, quakers, quakers-and-shakers, shaking grass, tottergrass, and wag-wantons.

== Description ==
B. media flowers from June to September in the UK, and is characterized by its fine stems and distinctive hops-shaped green and purplish spikelets. The plant is a loosely tufted perennial with short rhizomes arising from vegetative shoots. The culms typically attain a height of 15 – 60 cm, while the hairless dull glaucous to mid-green leaves are usually 4 – 20 cm long, 2 – 4 cm wide. They possess minute forward-pointing hairs with slender, boat-shaped tips.

The loose, roughly pyramidal panicles are 4 – 10 cm long, with up to 20 branches and 60 spikelets. The spikelets are 4 – 7 mm long, loosely scattered and drooping, laterally compressed and elliptic to ovate in shape.

== Distribution and habitat ==
This grass species is common in England and Wales but rare in northern Scotland. It is native and widely distributed in Britain and Europe, except for the extreme north. It is absent from Iceland, the Faroe Islands, the Isles of Scilly, and the far north and south of Ireland.

In North America, the species has been introduced and occurs in Connecticut, Massachusetts, Michigan, and Vermont in the USA, and in British Columbia and Ontario in Canada.

== Habitat and ecology ==
B. media is a characteristic species of unimproved species-rich grassland, grazed calcareous grassland and pasture, fens, old meadows, scree slopes, quarry soils, and roadside verges. Its seeds are consumed by many farmland birds. It is reported to be a poor competitor and, therefore, negatively affected by the high density of neighboring plants in unmanaged grassland. It appears able to tolerate a relatively high grazing regime

Predominantly a species of calcareous grassland, B. media occurs with a high constancy in multiple plant community types as defined by the National Vegetation Classification. These include, but are by no means restricted to, CG1 Festuca ovina – Carlina vulgaris to the CG10 Festuca ovina – Agrostis capillaris – Thymus praecox as well as the mesotrophic MG3 Anthoxanthum odoratum – Geranium sylvaticum grasslands.

The plant is grazed by several insect species, including the larvae of Leptopterna ferrugata, Apamea scolopacina, Phytomyza nigra, as well as the larvae and adults of Eriophyes tenuis, causing leaf rolling and sterility.

== Taxonomy ==
The subspecies Briza media subsp. media occurs throughout the species’ range, while subspecies elatior (Sibth. & Sm.) Rohlena occurs in southeast Europe.

There are no known hybrids.

It is distinguished from the closely related Briza maxima by the size of the flower spikelets.

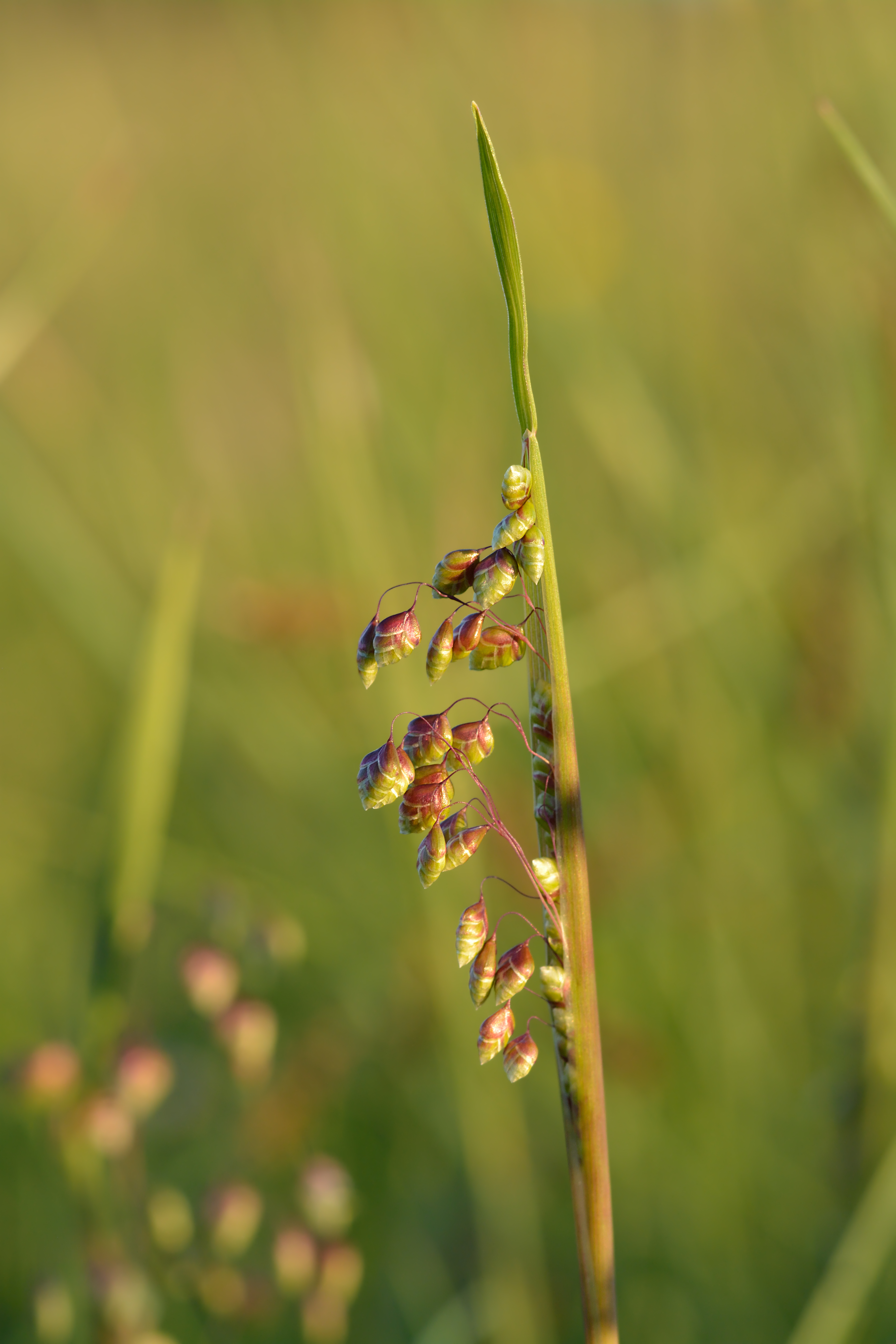
Keila, Estonia

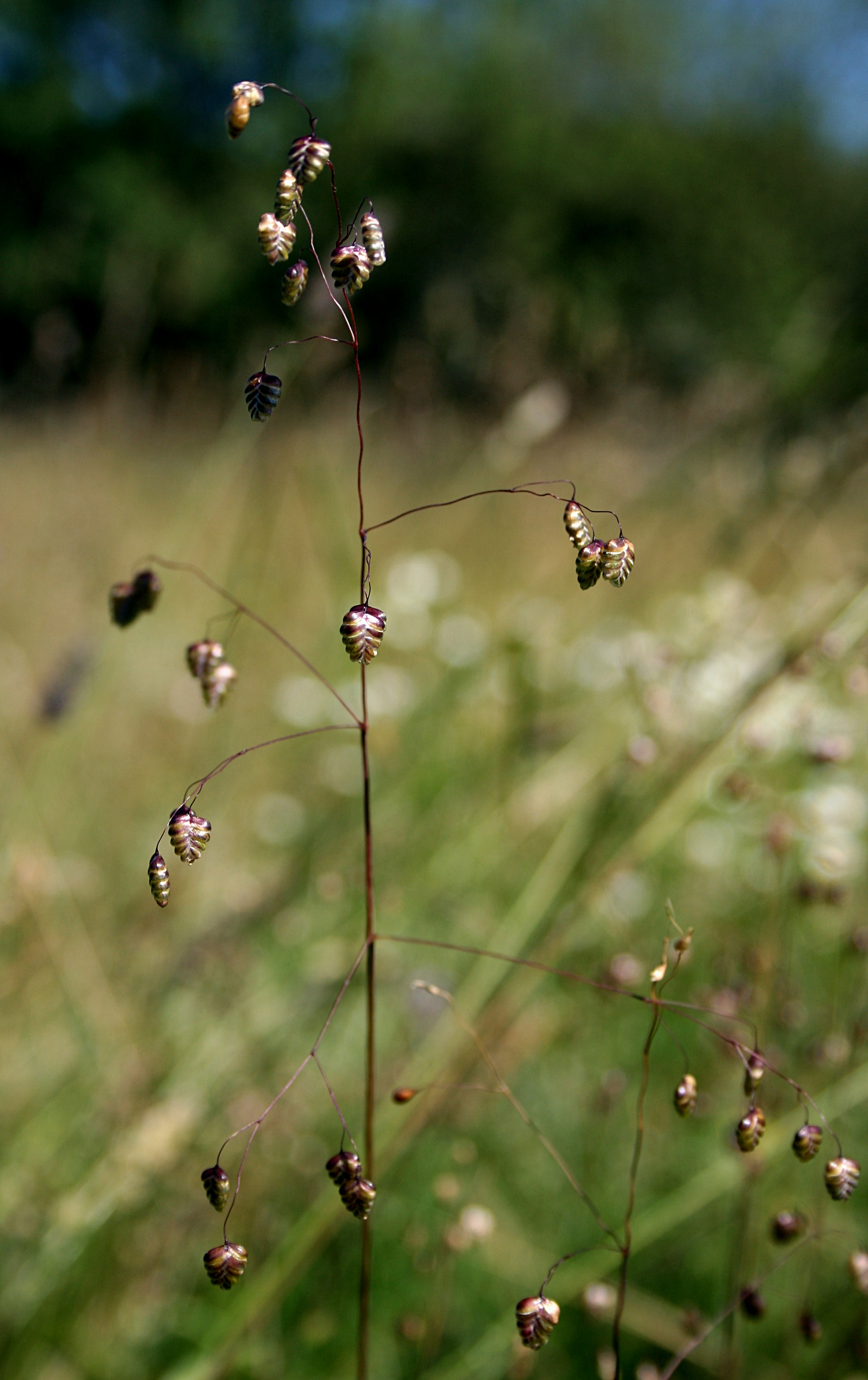
Bory Tucholskie National Park, Poland
