= British NVC community CG10 =

UK plant community type

NVC community CG10 (Festuca ovina - Agrostis capillaris - Thymus praecox grassland) is one of the calcicolous grassland communities in the British National Vegetation Classification system. Of the upland group of calcicolous grasslands, it is the only one with a short sward associated with heavy grazing.

It is a comparatively widely distributed community in the British uplands. There are three subcommunities.

== Community composition ==
The following constant species are found in this community:

- Common Bent (Agrostis capillaris)
- Harebell (Campanula rotundifolia)
- Sheep's Fescue (Festuca ovina)
- Red Fescue (Festuca rubra)
- Ribwort Plantain (Plantago lanceolata)
- Tormentil (Potentilla erecta)
- Self-heal (Prunella vulgaris)
- Wild Thyme (Thymus praecox)
- Common Dog-violet (Viola riviniana)
- Glittering Wood-moss (Hylocomium splendens)

The following rare species are also associated with the community:

- the Lady's-mantle (Alchemilla filicaulis ssp. filicaulis)
- the Lady's-mantle (Alchemilla wichurae)
- Hair Sedge (Carex capillaris)
- Soft-leaved Sedge (Carex montana)
- Rock Sedge (Carex rupestris)
- Hoary Whitlowgrass (Draba incana)
- Limestone Bedstraw (Galium sterneri)
- Spring Sandwort (Minuartia verna)
- Alpine Forget-me-not (Myosotis alpestris)
- Dwarf Cudweed (Omalotheca supina)
- Alpine Pearlwort (Sagina saginoides)
- Dwarf Willow (Salix herbacea)
- Sibbaldia (Sibbaldia procumbens)
- Scottish Asphodel (Tofieldia pusilla)

== Distribution ==
This community is found widely on calcareous upland sites in Scotland, northern England and Wales.

== Subcommunities ==
There are three subcommunities:

- the Trifolium repens - Luzula campestris subcommunity
- the Carex pulicaris - Carex panicea subcommunity
- the Saxifraga aizoides - Ditrichum flexicaule subcommunity
