= British NVC community H7 =

UK plant community type

NVC community H7 (Calluna vulgaris - Scilla verna heath) is one of the heath communities in the British National Vegetation Classification system. It is one of two communities categorised as maritime heaths.

It is a fairly widespread coastal community. There are five subcommunities.

== Community composition ==
The following eleven constant species are found in this community:

- Heather (Calluna vulgaris)
- Bell Heather (Erica cinerea)
- Sheep's Fescue (Festuca ovina)
- Yorkshire-fog (Holcus lanatus)
- Common Cat's-ear (Hypochaeris radicata)
- Bird's-foot Trefoil (Lotus corniculatus)
- Ribwort Plantain (Plantago lanceolata)
- Sea Plantain (Plantago maritima)
- Tormentil (Potentilla erecta)
- Spring Squill (Scilla verna)
- Wild Thyme (Thymus praecox)

The following rare species are associated with the community:

- Chives (Allium schoenoprasum)
- Purple Milk-vetch (Astragalus danicus)
- Cornish Heath (Erica vagans)
- Portland Spurge (Euphorbia portlandica)
- Hairy Greenweed (Genista pilosa)
- Fringed Rupturewort (Herniaria ciliolata)
- Land Quillwort (Isoetes histrix)
- Spring Sandwort (Minuartia verna)
- Scottish Primrose (Primula scotica)
- Autumn Squill (Scilla autumnalis)
- Spring Squill (Scilla verna)
- Autumn Ladies'-tresses (Spiranthes spiralis)
- Twin-headed Clover (Trifolium bocconei)
- Western Clover (Trifolium occidentale)

== Distribution ==
This community is found all around the coasts of Scotland, western Wales, Devon and Cornwall.

== Subcommunities ==
There are five subcommunities:

- the Armeria maritima subcommunity
- the Viola riviniana subcommunity
- the Erica tetralix subcommunity
- the Empetrum nigrum ssp. nigrum subcommunity
- the Calluna vulgaris subcommunity
