= Pewsey Downs =

Hills in Wiltshire, England

Coordinates: 51.37135°N 1.83905°W

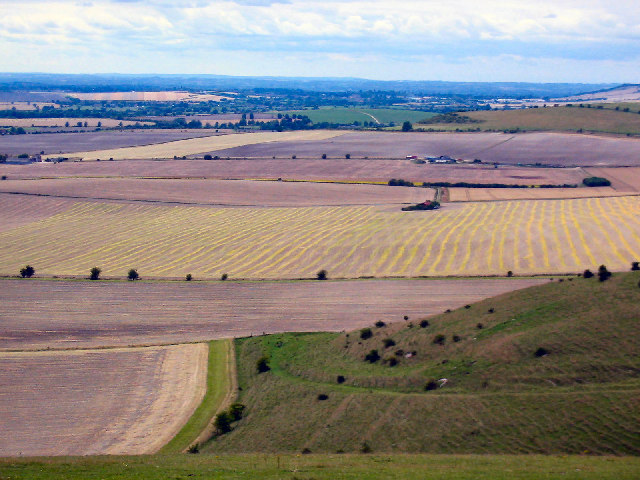
View West, Walkers Hill, Pewsey Downs

Pewsey Downs (grid reference SU113636) is a 305.3 hectare biological Site of Special Scientific Interest on the southern edge of the Marlborough Downs north of Pewsey in Wiltshire, notified in 1951. It includes the Pewsey Downs National Nature Reserve.

== Plants ==
In 1859, the Reverent Alexander Irvine recorded the following species of plants on the Pewsey Downs; Cirsium acaule; Carduus nutans; Cirsium eriophorum; Draba verna; Bunium bulbocastanum; Spiraea filipendula; Medicago sativa; Onobrychis sativa; Cichorium intybus; Campanula glomerata; Campanula rotundifolia; Asperula cynanchica; Polygala vulgaris; Saxifraga granulata; Anacamptis morio; Dactylorhiza maculata; Gymnadenia conopsea; and Botrychium lunaria.

== Pewsey Downs National Nature Reserve ==
The Pewsey Downs National Nature Reserve is an area of unspoiled chalk downland situated on a steep slope above the Vale of Pewsey. It includes the south-facing slopes of Milk Hill, Walkers Hill and Knap Hill. The habitat is mostly grassland and the site includes the Alton Barnes White Horse. The reserve is a Special Area of Conservation and part of the Pewsey Downs Site of Special Scientific Interest.

The main grass species in the community are sheep's fescue (Festuca ovina) and red fescue (Festuca rubra) and there is an absence of the dwarf sedge (Carex humilis), which is common at other downland sites nearby. Flowering plants found in the reserve include such rarities as the early gentian (Gentianella anglica), the burnt-tip orchid (Neotinea ustulata), the lesser butterfly orchid (Platanthera bifolia) and the frog orchid (Coeloglossum viride). These, along with other wildflowers, provide the nectar on which many species of butterfly feed. The butterflies found on the reserve include the internationally rare marsh fritillary, the adonis blue and the chalkhill blue.
