= Calcicolous grasslands in the British National Vegetation Classification system =

UK plant community type

The calcicolous grassland communities of the British National Vegetation Classification system were described in Volume 3 of British Plant Communities, first published in 1992, along with the mesotrophic grassland communities and the calcifugous grasslands and montane communities.

== History ==
In total, 14 calcicolous grassland communities have been identified.

All but two of the calcicolous grassland communities fall into two broad groups:

- seven communities which group loosely together under an umbrella of "chalk grassland" and which are found on calcareous soils in the comparatively dry climatic conditions of the lowlands of southern and eastern England (and also in northern and southern coastal areas of Wales).
- five upland calcicole communities, distributed in areas of wetter climate through the uplands of Wales, northern England and Scotland.

The lowlands group comprises two subgroups:

- three short-sward communities associated with heavy grazing: a widespread community (CG2) that is regarded as "typical" chalk grassland, though it also occurs widely on limestone, and its "south-west coastal" (CG1) and "eastern" (CG7) counterparts
- four communities of rank, tussocky grassland associated with low levels of grazing (CG3, CG4, CG5 and CG6)

The upland group comprises the following subgroups:

- a widespread short-sward community associated with heavy grazing, CG10
- two localised communities characterised by the presence of Alpine Lady's-mantle (Alchemilla alpina), CG11 and CG12
- two localised communities characterised by the presence of Mountain Avens (Dryas octopetala), CG13 and CG14

The remaining two communities (CG8 and CG9) are characterised by the presence of Blue Moor-grass (Sesleria caerulea), both of which are localised in northern England and do not fall neatly into either of the two groups described above.

== List of communities ==
The following is a list of the communities that make up this category:

- CG1 Festuca ovina – Carlina vulgaris grassland
- CG2 Festuca ovina – Avenula pratensis grassland
- CG3 Bromus erectus grassland
- CG4 Brachypodium pinnatum grassland
- CG5 Bromus erectus – Brachypodium pinnatum grassland
- CG6 Avenula pubescens grassland
- CG7 Festuca ovina – Hieracium pilosella – Thymus praecox/pulegioides grassland
- CG8 Sesleria albicans – Scabiosa columbaria grassland
- CG9 Sesleria albicans – Galium sterneri grassland
- CG10 Festuca ovina – Agrostis capillaris – Thymus praecox grassland
- CG11 Festuca ovina – Agrostis capillaris – Alchemilla alpina grass-heath
- CG12 Festuca ovina – Alchemilla alpina – Silene acaulis dwarf-herb community
- CG13 Dryas octopetala – Carex flacca heath
- CG14 Dryas octopetala – Silene acaulis ledge community
