= British NVC community OV2 =

UK plant community type

British NVC community OV2 (Briza minor - Silene gallica community) is one of the open habitat communities in the British National Vegetation Classification system. It is one of six arable weed and track-side communities of light, less-fertile acid soils.

It is a very localised community. There are no subcommunities.

== Community composition ==
The following constant species are found in this community:

- Scarlet pimpernel (Anagallis arvensis)
- Lesser quaking-grass (Briza minor)
- Sheep's sorrel (Rumex acetosella)
- Small-flowered catchfly (Silene gallica)
- Lesser trefoil (Trifolium dubium)

Three rare species are associated with the community:

- Lesser quaking-grass (Briza minor)
- Small-flowered catchfly (Silene gallica)
- Suffocated clover (Trifolium suffocatum)

== Distribution ==
This community is confined to disturbed sandy soils. It is now found only in The Scillies, where it is most often seen in bulb fields.
