= British NVC community SD11 =

UK plant community type

NVC community SD11 (Carex arenaria - Cornicularia aculeata dune community) is one of the 16 sand-dune communities in the British National Vegetation Classification system.

It is one of four communities associated with fixed dunes.

It is a comparatively localised community. There are two subcommunities.

== Community composition ==
The following constant species are found in this community:

- Sand sedge (Carex arenaria)
- the lichen Cornicularia aculeata

The following rare species are also associated with the community:

- Purple Milk-vetch (Astragalus danicus)
- Grey Hair-grass (Corynephorus canescens)

== Distribution ==
This community is found on the east coast, mostly on the sand-dunes of Norfolk and Suffolk, but also in Aberdeenshire and on the south coast of Kent. It is also found inland, in The Brecks on the Norfolk/Suffolk border.

== Subcommunities ==
There are two subcommunities:

- the Ammophila arenaria subcommunity
- the Festuca ovina subcommunity
