= British NVC community CG3 =

UK plant community type

NVC community CG3 (Bromus erectus grassland) is one of the calcicolous grassland communities in the British National Vegetation Classification system. It is one of four communities of rank, tussocky grassland associated with low levels of grazing, within the lowland calcicolous grassland group.

It is a comparatively widely distributed community. There are four subcommunities.

== Community composition ==
The following constant species are found in this community:

- Upright Brome (Bromus erectus)
- Glaucous Sedge (Carex flacca)
- Sheep's Fescue (Festuca ovina)
- Bird's-foot Trefoil (Lotus corniculatus)
- Ribwort Plantain (Plantago lanceolata)
- Salad Burnet (Sanguisorba minor)

The following rare species are also associated with the community:

- Man Orchid (Aceras anthropophorum)
- Purple Milk-vetch (Astragalus danicus)
- Dwarf Sedge (Carex humilis)
- Spotted Cat's-ear (Hypochoeris maculata)
- Perennial Flax (Linum perenne subsp. anglicum)
- Round-headed Rampion (Phyteuma tenerum)
- Chalk Milkwort (Polygala calcarea)
- Pasqueflower (Pulsatilla vulgaris)
- Field Fleawort (Senecio integrifolius ssp. integrifolius)
- Bastard-toadflax (Thesium humifusum)
- Large Thyme (Thymus pulegioides)

== Distribution ==
This community is found in lowland limestone grassland throughout England.

== Subcommunities ==
There are four subcommunities:

- the so-called typical subcommunity:
- the Centaurea nigra subcommunity
- the Knautia arvensis - Bellis perennis subcommunity
- the Festuca rubra - Festuca arundinacea subcommunity
