= British NVC community M1 =

UK plant community type

NVC community M1 (Sphagnum auriculatum bog pool community) is one of the mire communities in the British National Vegetation Classification system.

It is a fairly widespread community in western Britain, but absent from the east. There are no subcommunities.

== Community composition ==
The following constant species are found in this community:

- Common Cottongrass Eriophorum angustifolium
- Bogbean Menyanthes trifoliata
- Cow-horn Bog-moss Sphagnum denticulatum
- Feathery Bog-moss Sphagnum cuspidatum

Five rare species are associated with the community:

- Bog Orchid Hammarbya paludosa
- Brown Beak-sedge Rhynchospora fusca
- Rannoch-rush Scheuchzeria palustris
- Intermediate Bladderwort Utricularia intermedia
- Golden Bog-moss Sphagnum pulchrum

== Distribution ==
This community has its main concentration in northwest Scotland, including the Outer Hebrides, Inner Hebrides, Caithness and Argyll. It is also found in southwest Scotland, Cumbria, central Wales, the New Forest, and in the Southwest peninsula.
