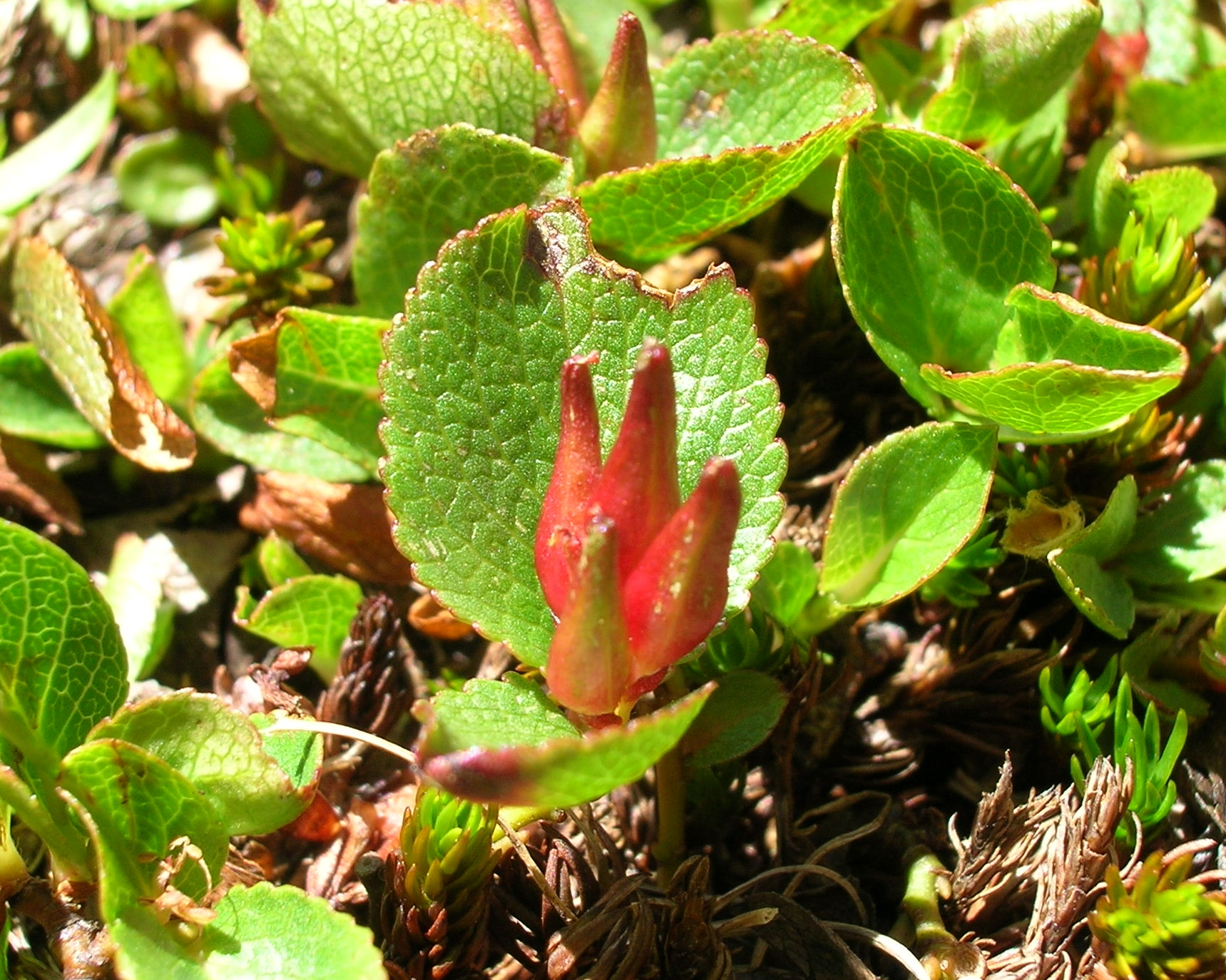
- Female plant with red fruits

Scientific classification
- Kingdom: Plantae
- Clade: Tracheophytes
- Clade: Angiosperms
- Clade: Eudicots
- Clade: Rosids
- Order: Malpighiales
- Family: Salicaceae
- Genus: Salix
- Species: S. herbacea

Binomial name
- Salix herbacea L.

= Salix herbacea =

Species of herb

Salix herbacea, the dwarf willow, least willow or snowbed willow, is a species of tiny creeping willow (family Salicaceae) adapted to survive in harsh arctic and subarctic environments. Distributed widely in alpine and arctic environments around the North Atlantic Ocean, it is one of the smallest woody plants.

== Distribution ==
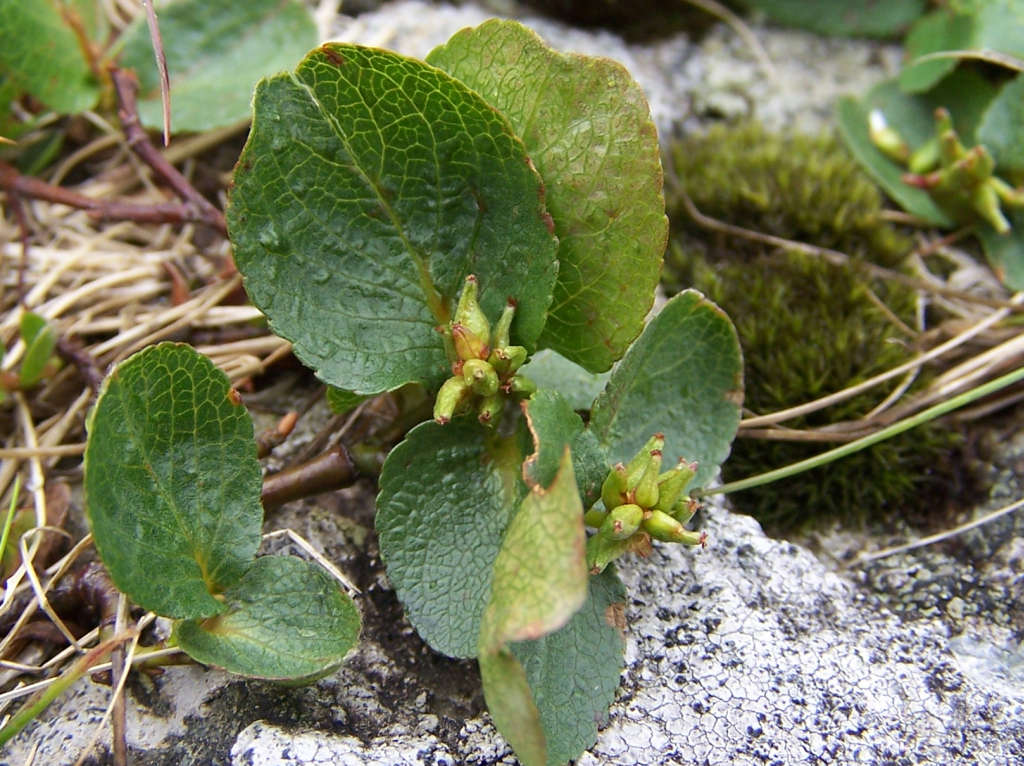
Leaves and seed capsules

Salix herbacea is adapted to survive in harsh environments, and has a wide distribution on both sides of the North Atlantic, in arctic northwest Asia, northern Europe, Greenland, and eastern Canada, and further south on high mountains, south to the Pyrenees, the northern Apennines, the Alps and the Rila in Europe, and the northern Appalachian Mountains in the eastern United States. It grows in tundra and rocky moorland, usually at over 1,500 metres (5,000 feet) elevation in the south of its range but down to sea level in the Arctic.

== Description ==
The dwarf willow is one of the smallest woody plants in the world. It typically grows to only 1–6 centimetres (1/2–2 1/2 inches) in height, with spreading prostrate branches, reddish brown and very sparsely hairy at first, growing just underground forming open mats. The leaves are deciduous, rounded, crenate to toothed and shiny green with paler undersides, 0.3–2 cm long and broad. Like other willows, it is dioecious, with male and female catkins on separate plants. As a result, the plant's appearance varies; the female catkins are red-coloured when ripe, while the male catkins are yellow-coloured. In colder biomes with habitat fragmentation, geographic isolation, and heterogeneous availability of resources, the dwarf willow often exhibits clonal propagation of genets in which ramets are physiologically integrated and thereby share resources. Some genets of the dwarf willow in the Northern Apennines in Italy are at least 2000 years old. In the Artic-Alpine distribution environment, the growing season is only 3-4 months long, while for the rest of the year plants are exposed to freezing temperatures or covered by snow.
