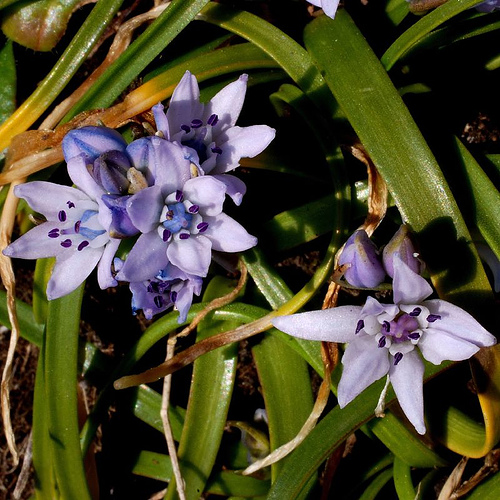

Scientific classification
- Kingdom: Plantae
- Clade: Tracheophytes
- Clade: Angiosperms
- Clade: Monocots
- Order: Asparagales
- Family: Asparagaceae
- Subfamily: Scilloideae
- Genus: Scilla
- Species: S. verna

Binomial name
- Scilla verna Huds.

Synonyms
- Tractema verna (Huds.) Speta

= Scilla verna =

Spring squill

Species of flowering plant

Scilla verna, commonly known as spring squill, is a flowering plant native to Western Europe and Morocco. It belongs to the squill genus Scilla. Its star-like blue flowers are produced in April and May.

== Description ==
It is a small plant, usually reaching 5–15 centimetres in height. It is perennial and grows from a bulb which is 10-15 millimetres across and ovoid in shape. Two to seven leaves grow from the base of the plant; they are long and narrow, measuring 3–20 cm by 2–5 mm. The flowers grow in a dense cluster of two to twelve at the top of the upright stem. They are scentless and have six violet-blue tepals, 5–8 mm long. Each flower has a 5–15 mm long, bluish bract at the base. The seeds are ovoid and black. The diploid number of chromosomes is 20 or 22.

== Habitat ==
The plant occurs from Morocco north through Portugal, Spain, France, Great Britain (particularly the west coast) and Ireland (mainly along the east coast), reaching as far as the Faroe Islands and Norway. It is found in short dry grassy areas, usually near the sea, though it is found at 415 metres above sea level on Foula. It is one of the key components of the H7 plant community in the British National Vegetation Classification system. It was chosen as the county flower for County Down in Northern Ireland after a public vote organised by the charity Plantlife in 2002.

== Ecology ==
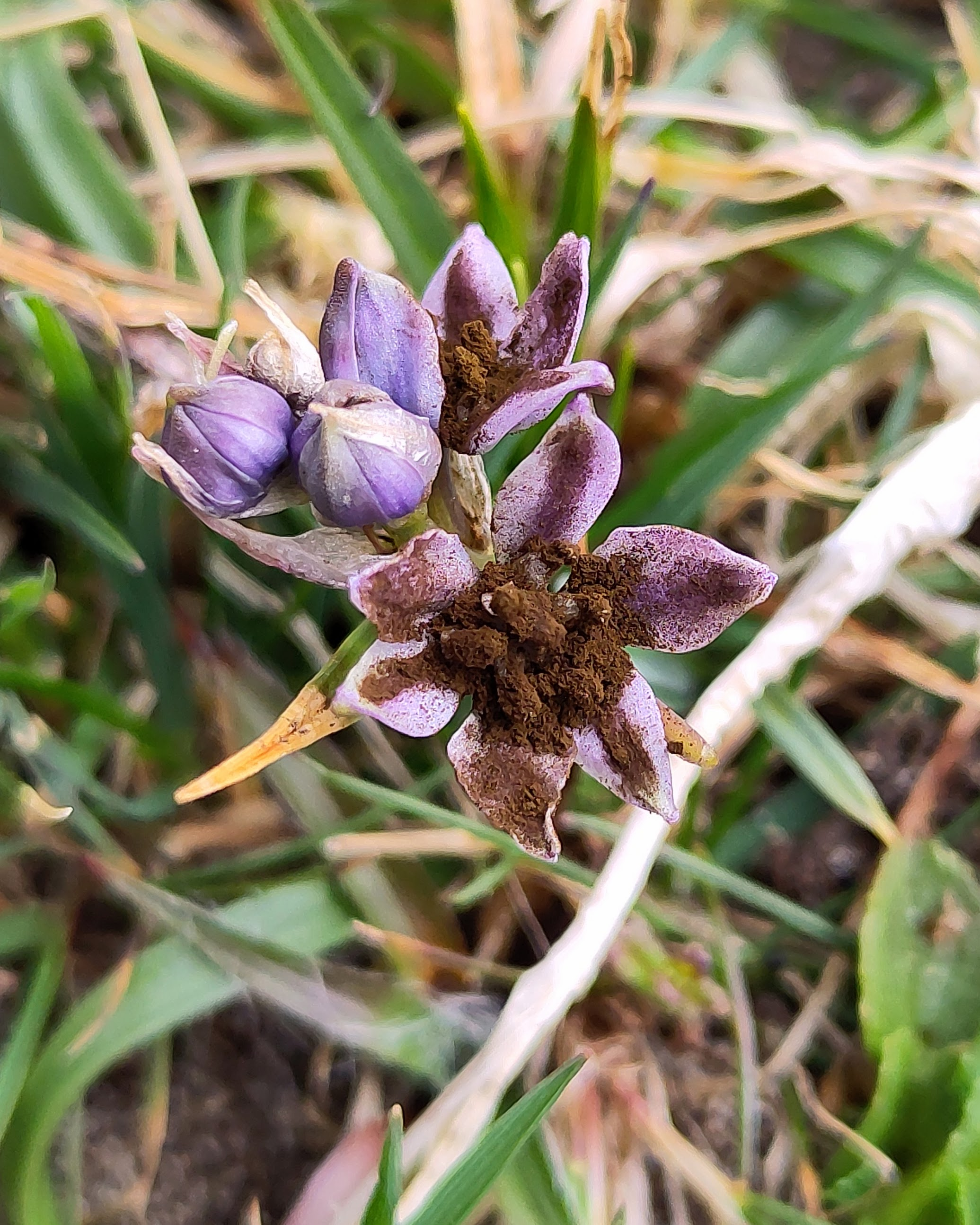
Spores of Antherospora tractemae on flowers of Scilla verna

A smut fungus, Antherospora tractemae, infects the flowers. It is named after a synonym of the hostplant, Tractema verna. The phylogeny of the smut fungus supports the alternative taxonomy placing the hostplant in the genus Tractema.

The leaves are infected by the rust fungi Uromyces scillinus and Uromyces scillarum.

== See also ==
- List of Scilla species
