= Hoary rock-rose =

Hoary rock-rose is a common name for several plants and may refer to:

- Cistus × incanus
- Cistus creticus
- Helianthemum canum
- Helianthemum oelandicum
