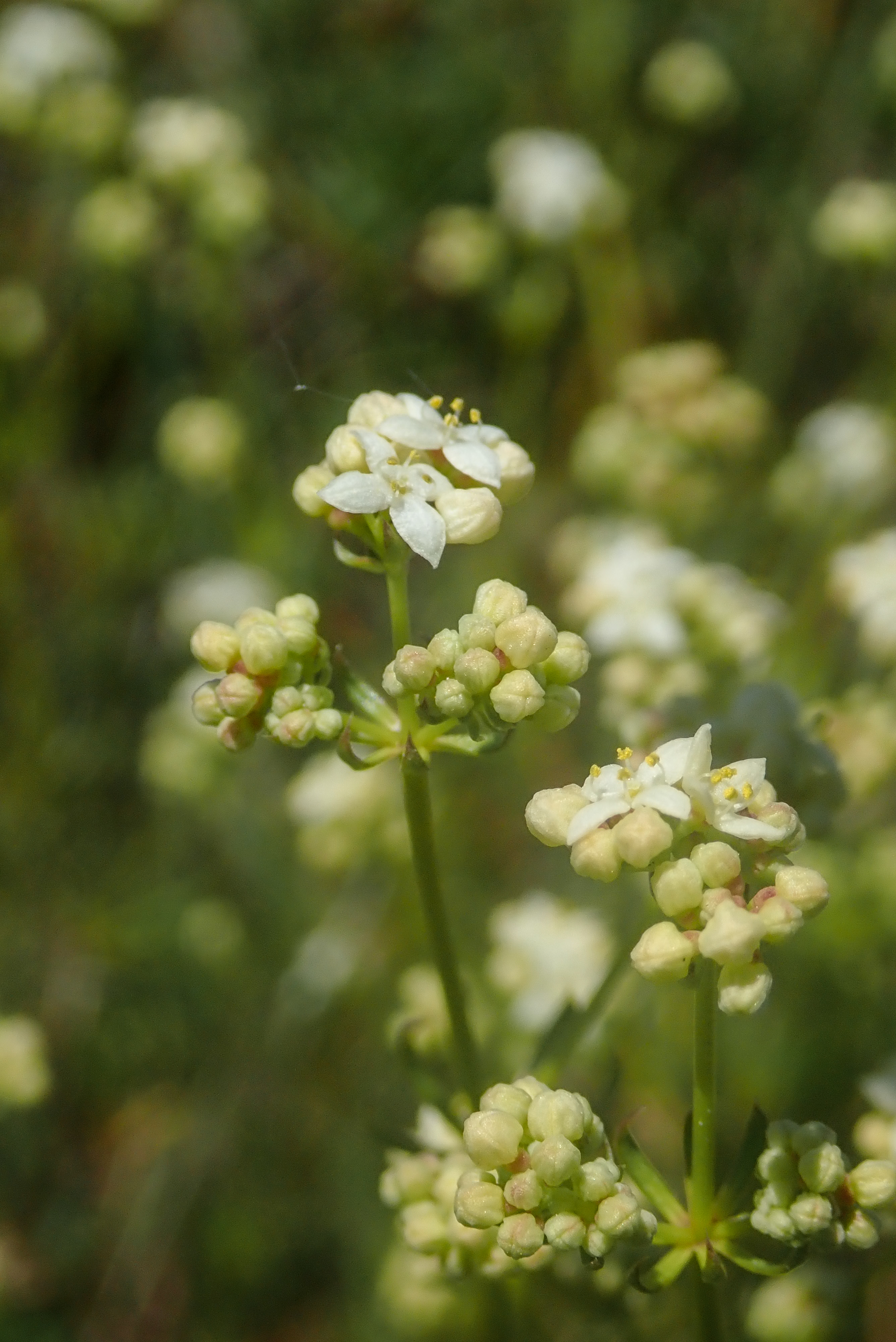

Scientific classification
- Kingdom: Plantae
- Clade: Tracheophytes
- Clade: Angiosperms
- Clade: Eudicots
- Clade: Asterids
- Order: Gentianales
- Family: Rubiaceae
- Genus: Galium
- Species: G. sterneri

Binomial name
- Galium sterneri Ehrend.

Synonyms
- Galium pumilum subsp. septentrionale

= Galium sterneri =

Limestone bedstraw

Plant species in the coffee family

Galium sterneri or limestone bedstraw is a plant species of bedstraw in the coffee family. It is native to northern Europe in countries that border the North Sea and Ireland but not further south than northern Germany. It tends to be found in grassy or rocky areas and is often associated with limestone. The species was only scientifically described in 1960.

== Description ==
Galium sterneri is perennial plant with many flowerless stems that grow along the ground and branch to form a dense mat. The flowering stems can reach up to 30 centimeters in length and are ascending to erect. The cross section of the stems is quadrangular, having four distinct sides. They are hairless and are 1 to 2 millimeters thick. All parts of the plant will turn greenish-black when dried.

The leaves are oblanceolate, shaped like a reversed spear head, and are attached in whorls of seven to eight leaves around the stem. They measure 7 to 11 mm long with many backwards pointing rough hairs along the edges of the leaves.

The flowers are in a small pyramid shaped panicles, a very branched inflorescence. Its flowers are creamy-white or rarely greenish-white and about 3 mm in diameter. The anthers, the tips of the stamens with the pollen, are yellow. Flowering can occur during May, June, or July. Its fruits are somewhat green to brown and covered in sharp warty shapes, but not hairy, measuring 1 to 1.4 mm.

== Taxonomy ==
Galium sterneri was scientifically described and named by Friedrich Ehrendorfer in 1960. It is classified in the genus Galium, a part of the family Rubiaceae. A description that does not match the description of the species named Galium pumilum subsp. septentrionale that is a homotypic synonym was published in 1945 by Nils Hylander and credited to Karl Rikard Sterner.

=== Names ===
Galium sterneri is known by the common name limestone bedstraw.

== Range and habitat ==
Galium sterneri is native to northern Europe in the countries of Norway, Denmark including the Faroe Islands, Germany, Ireland, and the United Kingdom. In Norway it grows in just a small area in the southwest facing the North Sea. It is widespread in Denmark, but is only reported from a small area of northern Germany in Schleswig-Holstein. In Ireland the species is most often reported in an area in the central western part of the island, but with widely scattered reports from the north. On Great Britain it grows in more rugged areas such as in Wales, the northwest of England, Scotland, and Orkney. In the UK it has been found growing at elevations as high as 975 meters on Creag Mhor.

It grows in dry to moist habitats that are grassy or rocky, especially alkaline areas such as on limestone, mica-schist, and basic igneous rocks.
