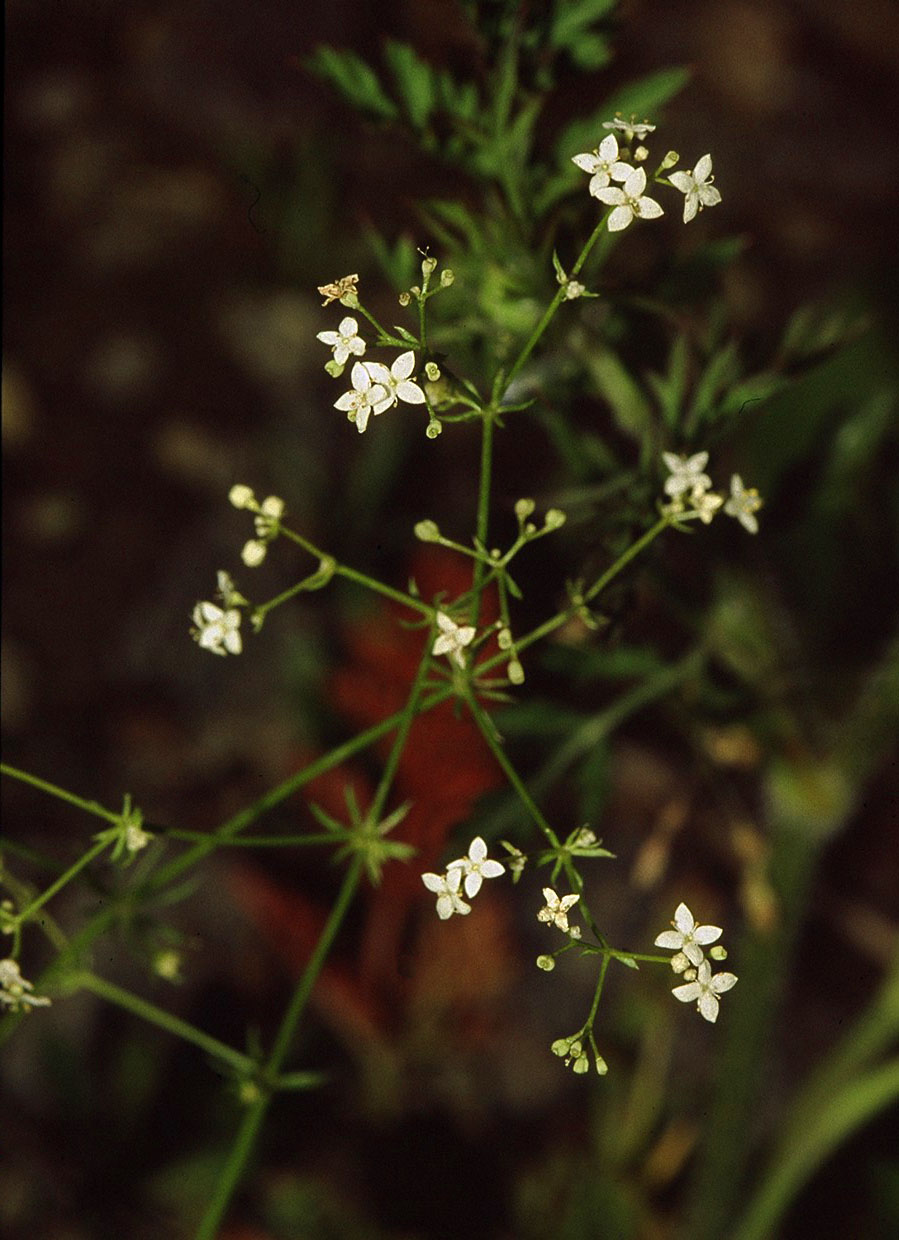

Scientific classification
- Kingdom: Plantae
- Clade: Tracheophytes
- Clade: Angiosperms
- Clade: Eudicots
- Clade: Asterids
- Order: Gentianales
- Family: Rubiaceae
- Genus: Galium
- Species: G. pumilum

Binomial name
- Galium pumilum Murray

= Galium pumilum =

Species of plant

Galium pumilum, the slender bedstraw or small bedstraw, is a plant species of the genus Galium.
