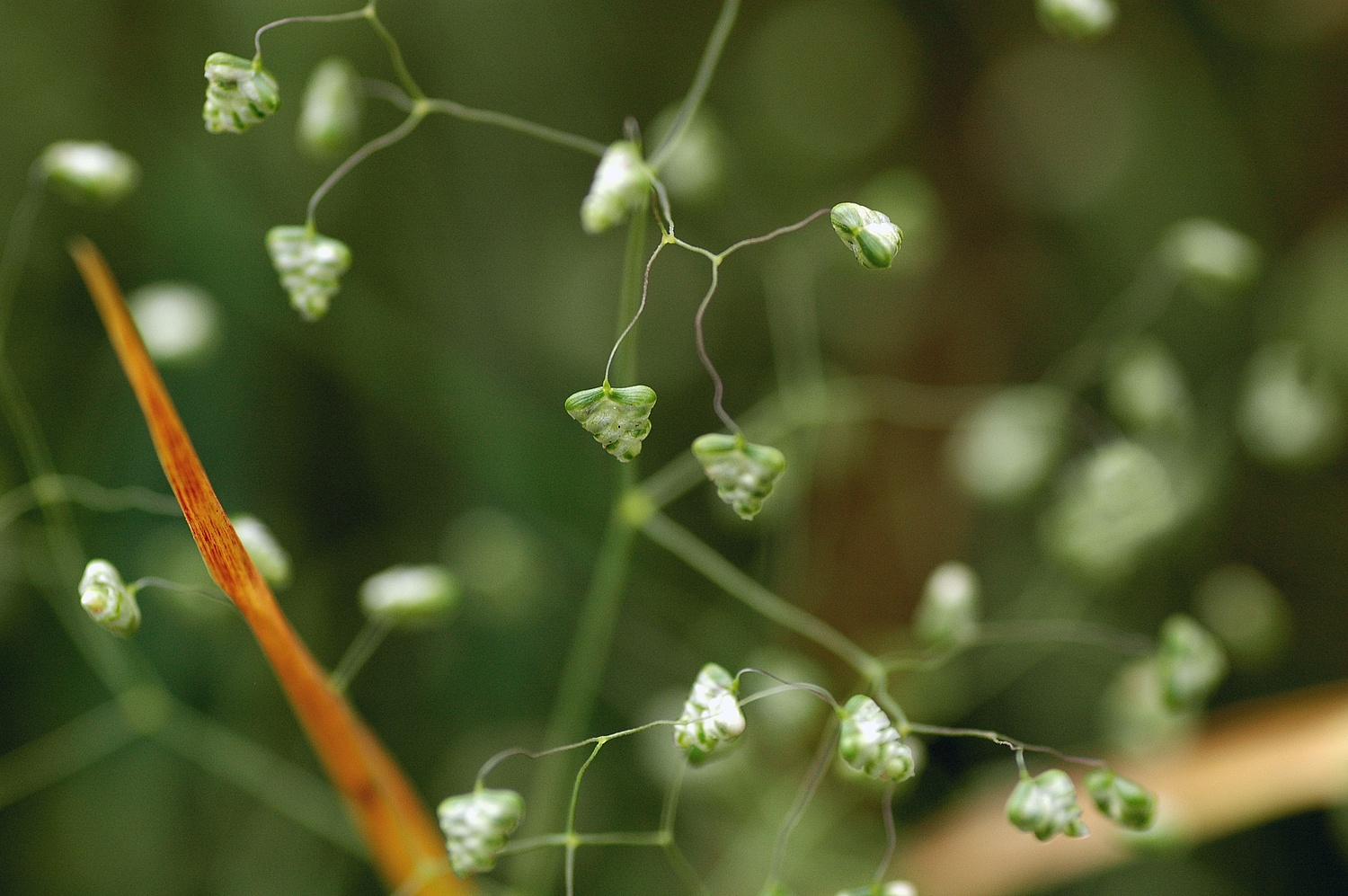

Scientific classification
- Kingdom: Plantae
- Clade: Tracheophytes
- Clade: Angiosperms
- Clade: Monocots
- Clade: Commelinids
- Order: Poales
- Family: Poaceae
- Subfamily: Pooideae
- Genus: Briza
- Species: B. minor

Binomial name
- Briza minor L.

= Briza minor =

Species of plant

Briza minor is a species of grass known by the common names lesser quaking-grass or little quakinggrass. It is native to the Mediterranean Basin, and it is known elsewhere, including much of North America, as an introduced species. It is an annual grass producing narrow clumps of erect stems up to 50 centimeters tall. The inflorescence bears several small cone-shaped spikelets, each hanging on a pedicel.
