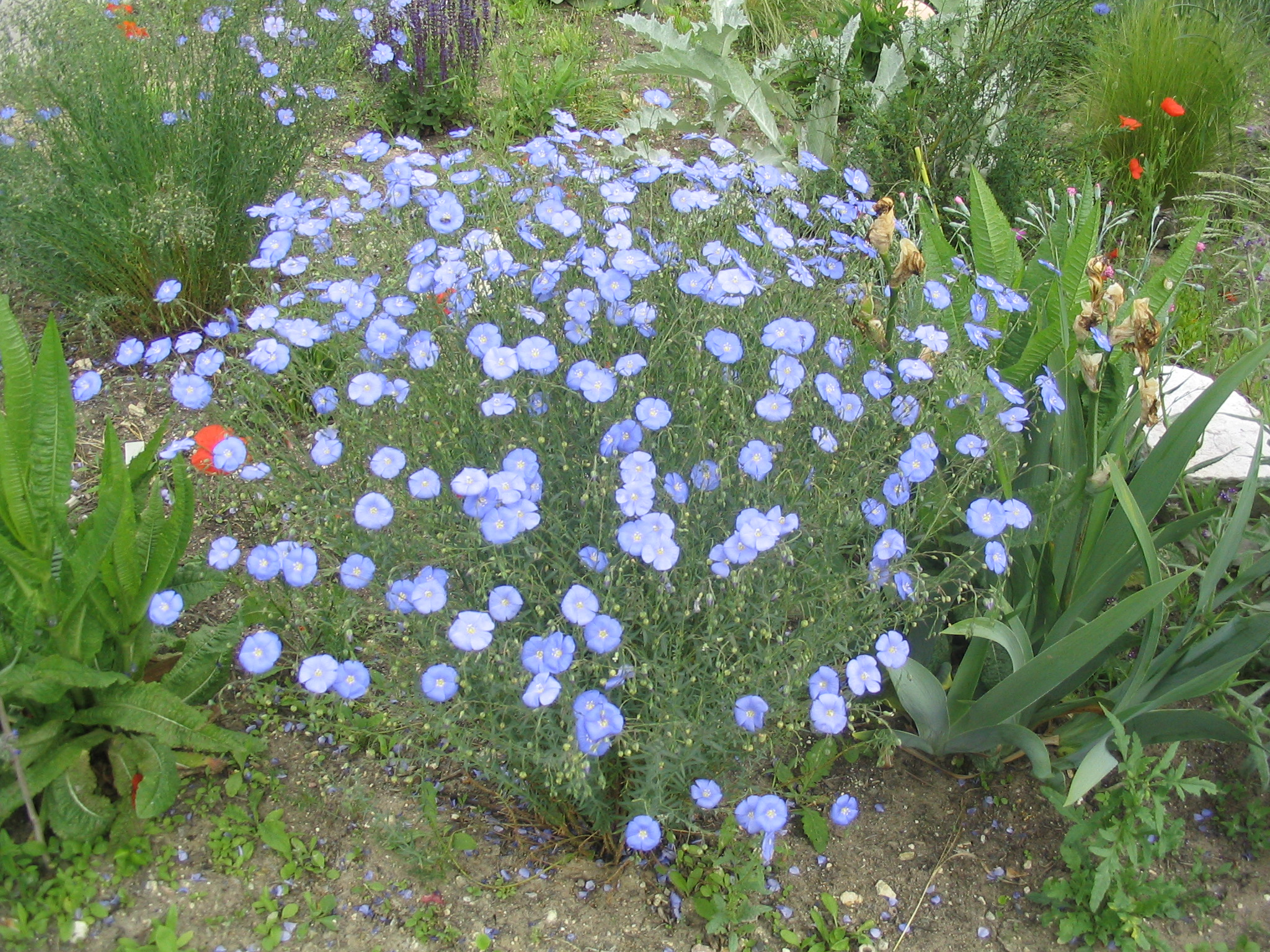

Scientific classification
- Kingdom: Plantae
- Clade: Tracheophytes
- Clade: Angiosperms
- Clade: Eudicots
- Clade: Rosids
- Order: Malpighiales
- Family: Linaceae
- Genus: Linum
- Species: L. perenne

Binomial name
- Linum perenne L.

Synonyms
- List: Adenolinum perenne (L.) Rchb.; Adenolinum sibiricum Rchb.; Linum alpestre Bubani; Linum alpinum Schangin; Linum brevisepalum Juz.; Linum darmstadinum Alef.; Linum decurrens Kellogg; Linum elatum Salisb.; Linum perenne roseum Barr & Sugden; Linum sibiricum DC.

= Linum perenne =

Plant species in the flax family

Linum perenne, the perennial flax, blue flax or lint, is a flowering plant in the family Linaceae, native to Europe, primarily in the Alps and locally in England. It has been introduced into North America, where it can be found on mountain ridges, wooded areas, and in sandy plain habitats of the sagebrush steppe, growing near sagebrush and rabbitbrush (Chrysothamnus).

It is a slender herbaceous perennial plant growing to 90 centimetres (3 ft) tall from a fairly woody root crown, with tough, unbranched stems, and many spirally arranged narrow lanceolate leaves 1–2.5 cm long. The flowers are blue, 2.5–5 cm (1–2 in) in diameter, and have five petals. The flowers will fall off if the stems are broken.

The English populations are sometimes distinguished as Linum perenne subsp. anglicum and high altitude populations in the Alps as Linum perenne subsp. alpinum. The similar western North American species Linum lewisii is sometimes treated as a subspecies of L. perenne.

Native Americans used the stems to make fishing line and nets.

== Cultivation ==
Cultivars for garden use include 'Blue Sapphire'.
