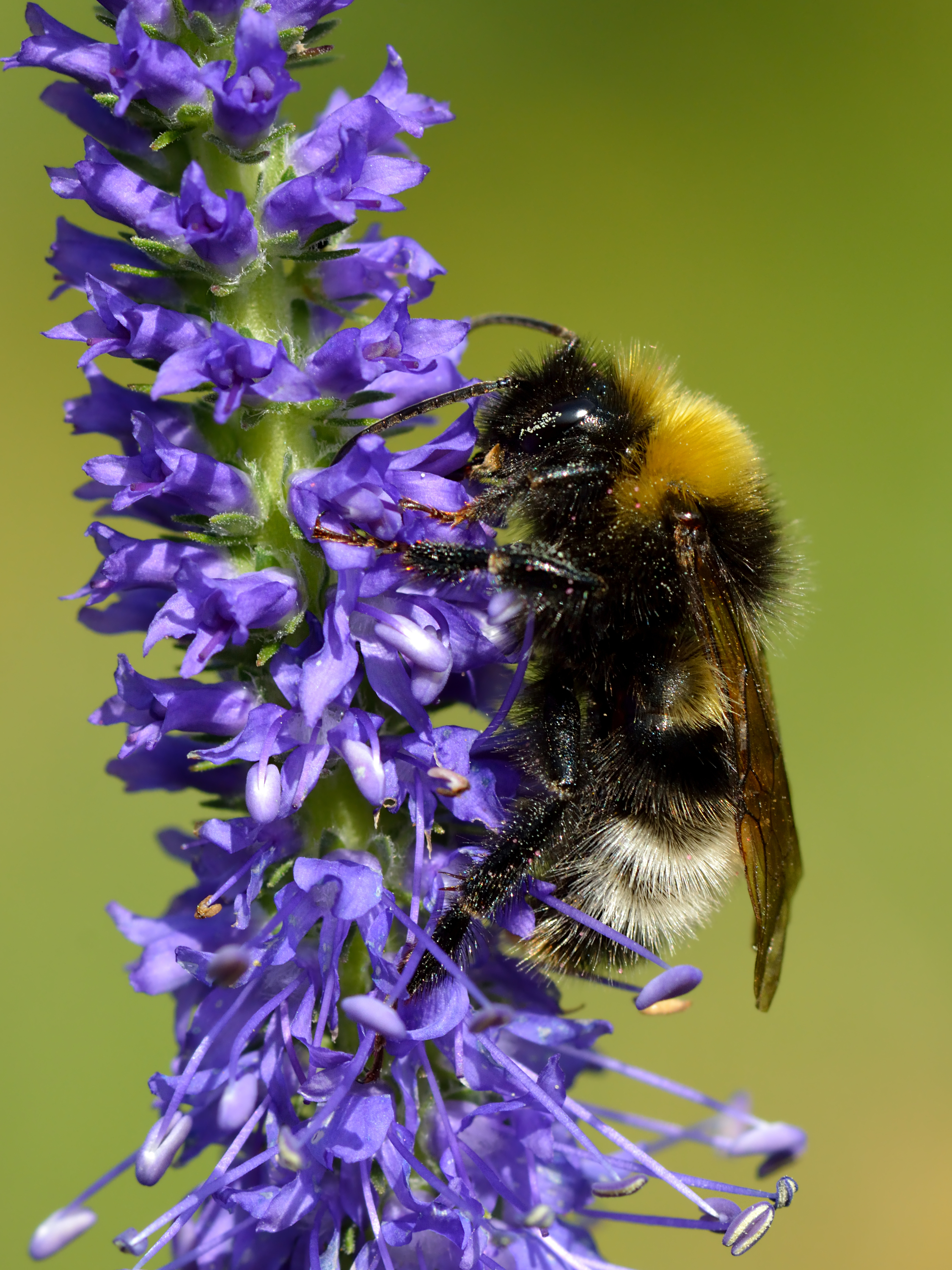

Scientific classification
- Kingdom: Plantae
- Clade: Embryophytes
- Clade: Tracheophytes
- Clade: Spermatophytes
- Clade: Angiosperms
- Clade: Eudicots
- Clade: Asterids
- Order: Lamiales
- Family: Plantaginaceae
- Genus: Veronica
- Species: V. spicata

Binomial name
- Veronica spicata L.

= Veronica spicata =

Species of flowering plant

Veronica spicata (spiked speedwell; syn. Pseudolysimachion spicatum) is a species of flowering plant in the family Plantaginaceae. It is 1–3 feet (0.30–0.91 m) tall and bears 1 foot long spikes with blue, pink, purple and white flowers.

It is the county flower of Montgomeryshire in the United Kingdom. Cultivated varieties include blue ('Royal Candles'), red ('Red Fox') and white ('Noah Williams').

It became a protected species in the UK in 1975 under the Conservation of Wild Creatures and Wild Plants Act.

== Cultivars ==
Varieties artificially obtained for cultivation from Veronica spicata:

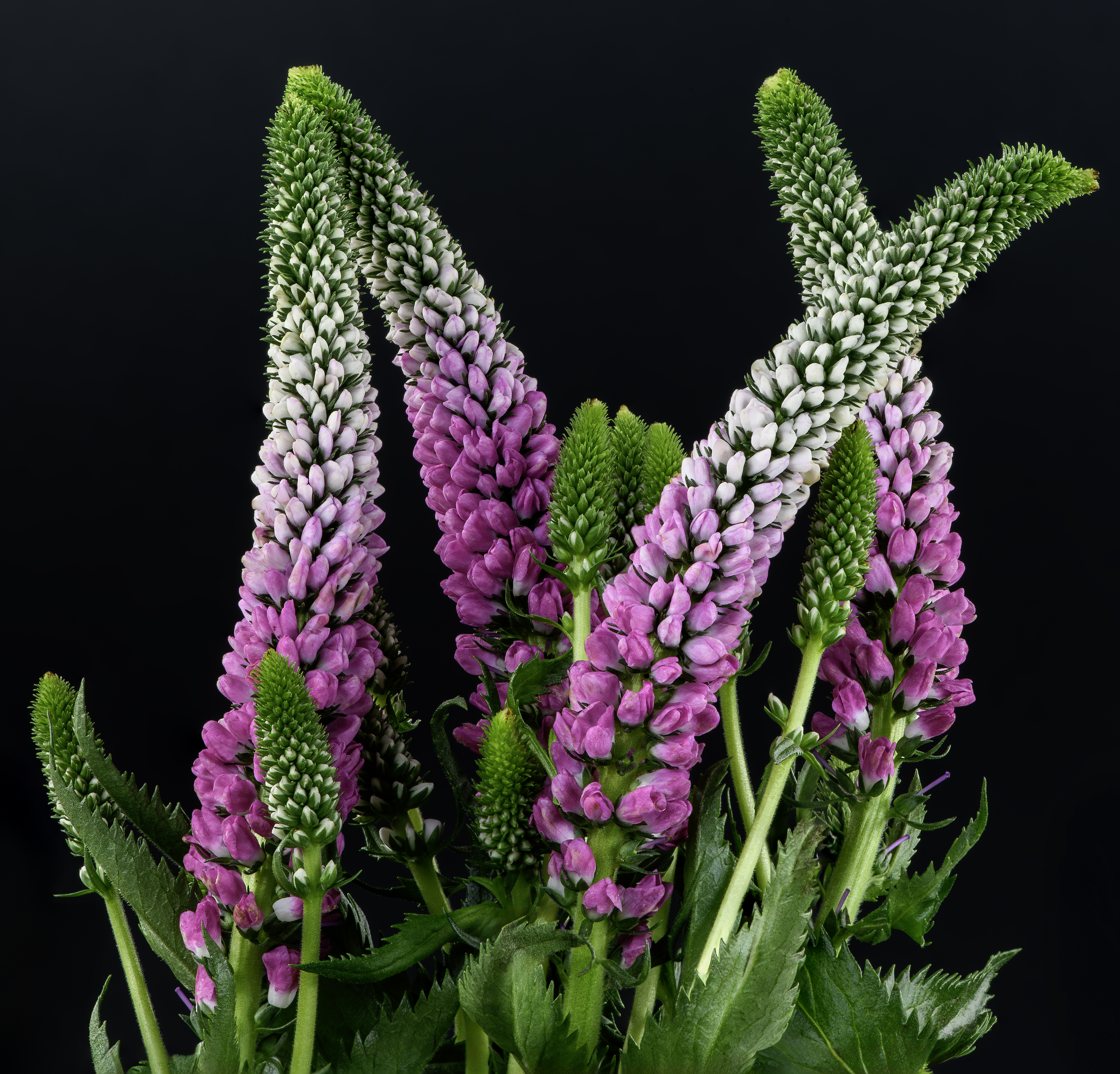
Veronica spicata 'Bubblegum Candeles'

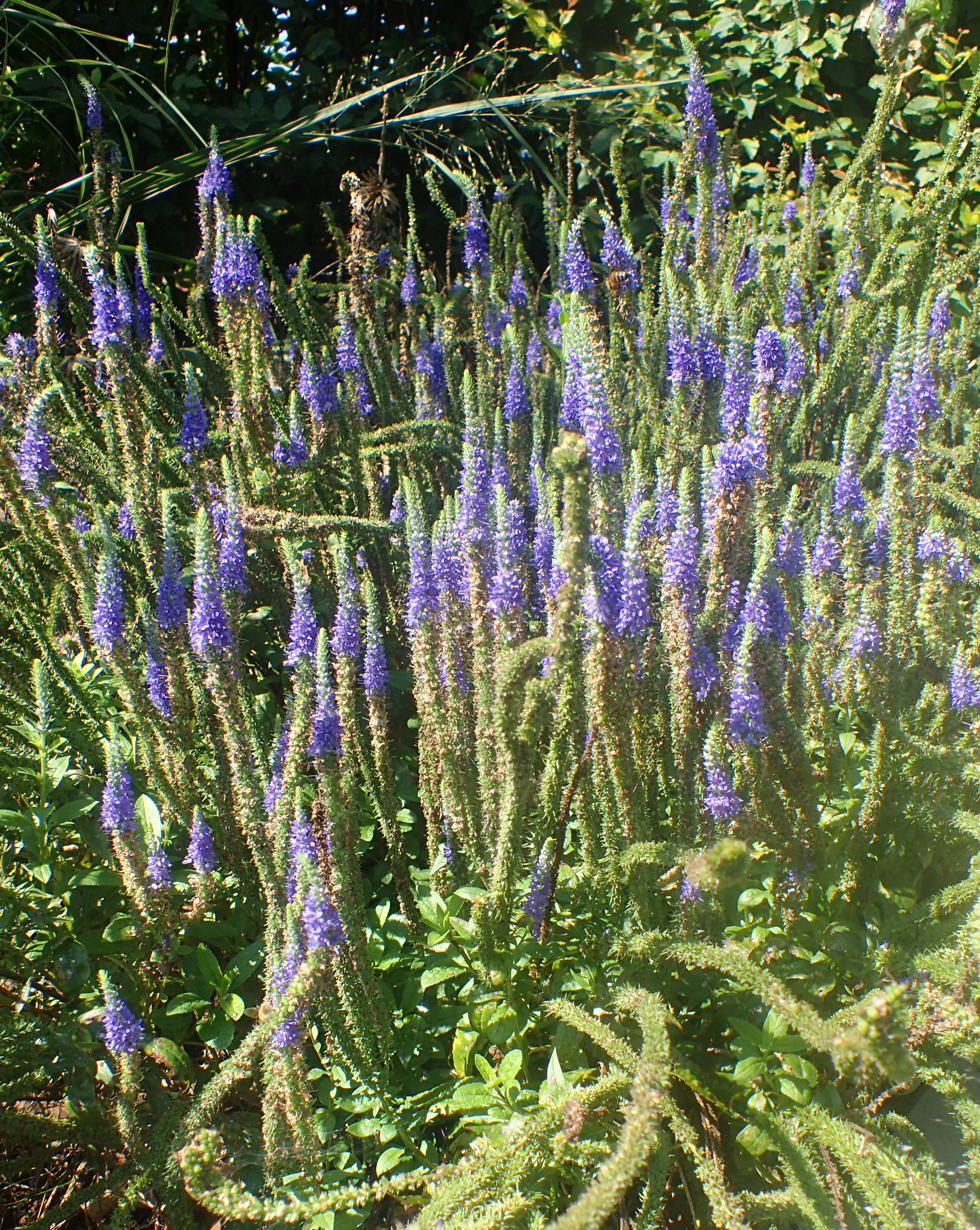
Veronica spicata 'Glory'
