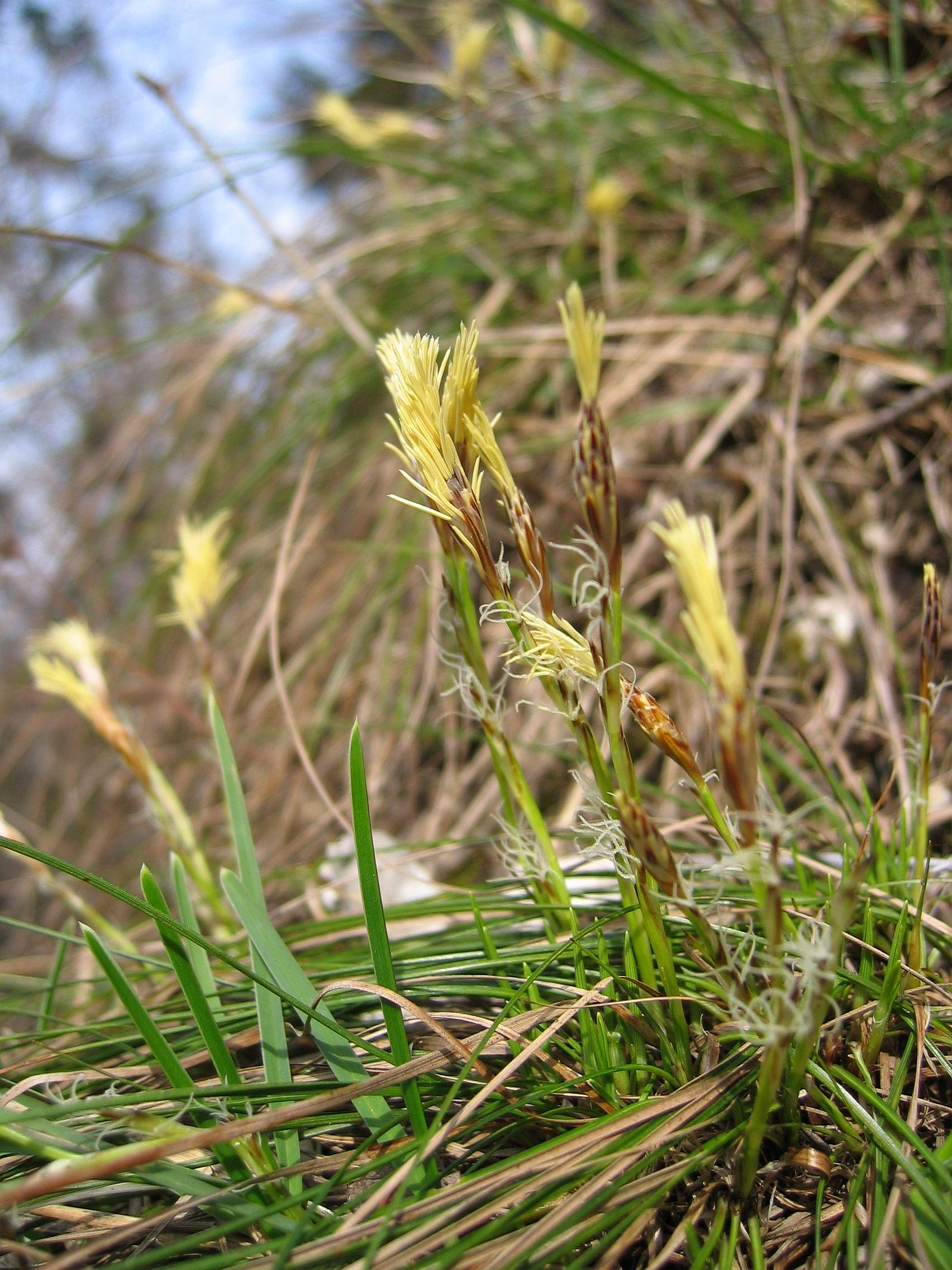

Scientific classification
- Kingdom: Plantae
- Clade: Tracheophytes
- Clade: Angiosperms
- Clade: Monocots
- Clade: Commelinids
- Order: Poales
- Family: Cyperaceae
- Genus: Carex
- Species: C. humilis

Binomial name
- Carex humilis Leyss.

= Carex humilis =

Species of grass-like plant

Carex humilis (also known as dwarf sedge) is a species of sedge that can be found in Western Europe.
