= Purple milkvetch =

Purple milkvetch or purple milk-vetch is a common name for several plants and may refer to:

- Astragalus agrestis, native to North America
- Astragalus danicus, native to Eurasia
- Astragalus hypoglottis, native to southern Europe
