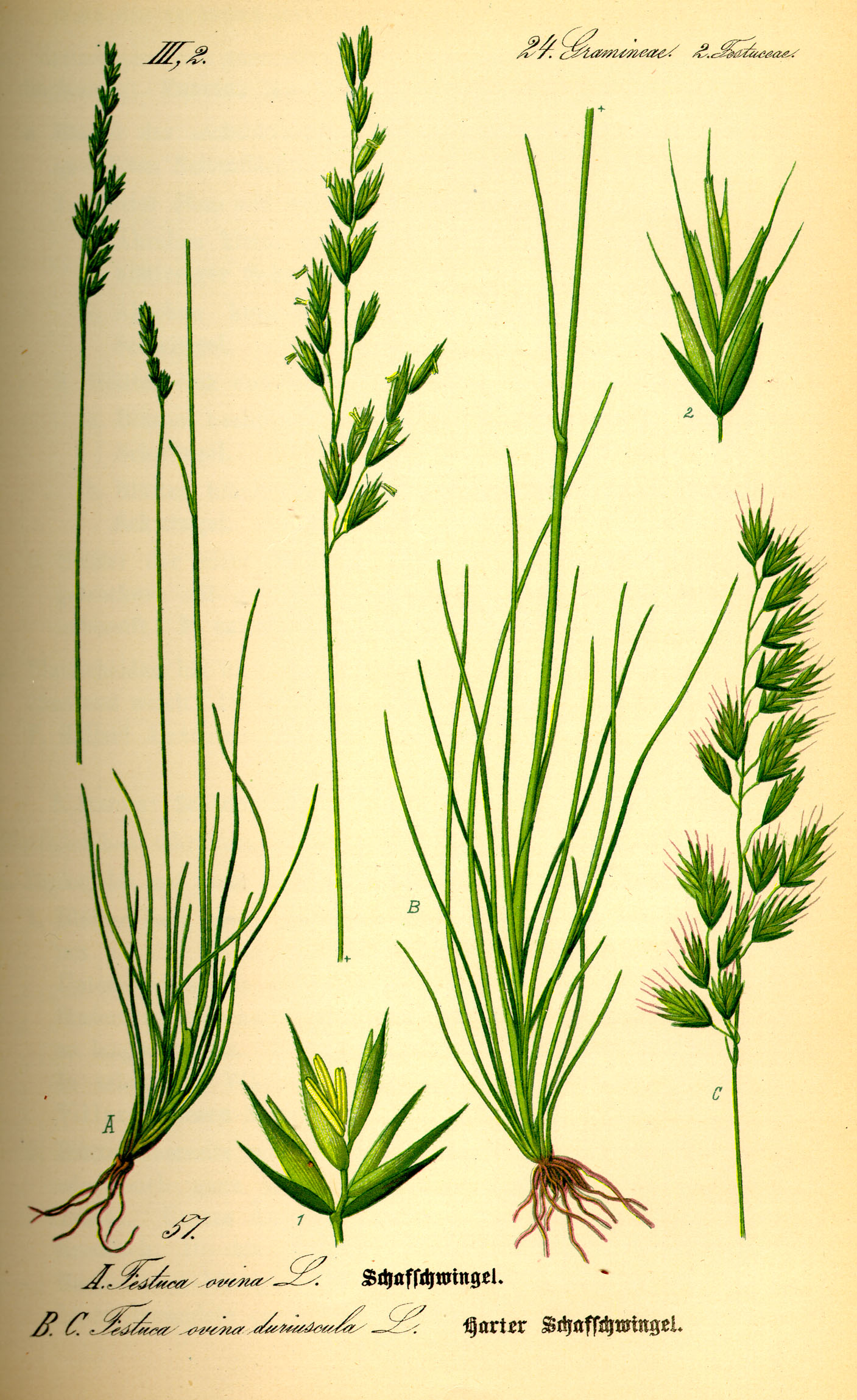
- Festuca ovina on left

Conservation status
- Unranked (NatureServe)

Scientific classification
- Kingdom: Plantae
- Clade: Embryophytes
- Clade: Tracheophytes
- Clade: Spermatophytes
- Clade: Angiosperms
- Clade: Monocots
- Clade: Commelinids
- Order: Poales
- Family: Poaceae
- Subfamily: Pooideae
- Genus: Festuca
- Species: F. ovina

Binomial name
- Festuca ovina L.

Synonyms
- List: Bromus ovinus (L.) Scop.; Gnomonia ovina (L.) Lunell; Avena ovina Salisb.; Festuca agrestis Wulfen ex Steud.; Festuca baumgarteniana Schur; Festuca capillaris Wulfen; Festuca centroapenninica (Markgr.-Dann.) Foggi, F.Conti & Pignatti; Festuca chiisanensis (Ohwi) E.B.Alexeev; Festuca cinerea var. scabrifolia (Hack.) M.Toman; Festuca diffusa V.N.Vassil.; Festuca eskia Lej.; Festuca filifolia Link; Festuca fontqueriana (St.-Yves) Romo; Festuca glauca var. scabrifolia Hack.; Festuca glaucantha Blocki; Festuca glaucoidea (J.Vetter) E.B.Alexeev; Festuca guestphalica Boenn. ex Rchb.; Festuca guinochetii (Bidault) S.Arndt; Festuca hallerioides Schur; Festuca heterophylla Wahlenb.; Festuca jumpeiana (Ohwi) Kitag.; Festuca lasiantha Schur; Festuca leucantha Schur; Festuca livida Schur; Festuca malzevii (Litv.) Reverd.; Festuca mariettana E.B.Alexeev; Festuca maskerensis (Litard.) Romo; Festuca multiflora Suter; Festuca nigra Gilib.; Festuca oligosantha Schur; Festuca pallens subsp. scabrifolia (Hack.) Zielonk.; Festuca pauciflora Schleich.; Festuca pietrosii Zapal.; Festuca pratensis Honck.; Festuca pumila Willk.; Festuca purpusiana (St.-Yves) Tzvelev; Festuca rupicola var. sulcatiformis (Markgr.-Dann.) Markgr.-Dann. ex Stohr; Festuca ruprechtii (Boiss.) V.I.Krecz. & Bobrov; Festuca sauvagei Romo; Festuca saximontana subsp. purpusiana (St.-Yves) Tzvelev; Festuca scabrifolia (Hack.) Patzke & G.H.Loos; Festuca sciaphila Schur; Festuca serpentinica (Krajina) M.Toman; Festuca sphagnicola B.Keller; Festuca sulcatiformis (Markgr.-Dann.) Patzke & G.H.Loos; Festuca trachyphylla var. pubescens (Hack.) Tzvelev; Festuca verguinii Sennen; Festuca vorobievii Prob.; Festuca vulgaris (Wallr.) Hayek; Festuca vylzaniae (Vylzan ex E.B.Alexeev) Tzvelev; Festuca weilleri (Litard.) Romo; Festuca yarochenkoi (St.-Yves) E.B.Alexeev; Poa setacea Koeler

= Festuca ovina =

Species of flowering plant

Festuca ovina, sheep's fescue or sheep fescue, is a species of grass. It is sometimes confused with hard fescue (Festuca trachyphylla).

== General description ==
It is a perennial plant sometimes found in acidic ground, and in mountain pasture, throughout Europe (with the exception of some Mediterranean areas) and eastwards across much of Asia; it has also been introduced to North America.

It is one of the defining species of the British NVC community CG2, i.e. Festuca ovina – Avenula pratensis grassland, one of the alkaline grassland communities. However, the species has a wide ecological tolerance in the UK, occurring on both basic and acid soils, as well as old mining sites and spoil heaps that are contaminated with heavy metals.

Sheep's fescue is a densely tufted perennial grass. Its greyish-green leaves are short and bristle-like. The panicles are both slightly feathery and a bit one-sided. It flowers from May until June, and is wind-pollinated. It has no rhizomes.

Sheep's fescue is a drought-resistant grass, commonly found on poor, well-drained mineral soil. It is sometimes used as a drought-tolerant lawn grass.

The great ability to adapt to poor soils is due to mycorrhizal fungi, which increase the absorption of water and nutrients and also are potential determinants of plant community structure. The symbiosis with fungi increases mineral, nitrogen and phosphate absorption, thanks to fungal hyphae that expand deeply in the soil and cover plant roots, increasing the exchange surface. The symbiosis also makes every plant interconnected with the surrounding plants, making possible the exchange of nutrients between plants far from each other.

More colourful garden varieties with blue-grey foliage are available.

== Wildlife value ==
This is one of the food plants for the caterpillars of several butterflies and moths, including the gatekeeper and the meadow brown, the small heath, Hesperia comma, Grayling and the grass moth Agriphila inquinatella.

== Photos ==
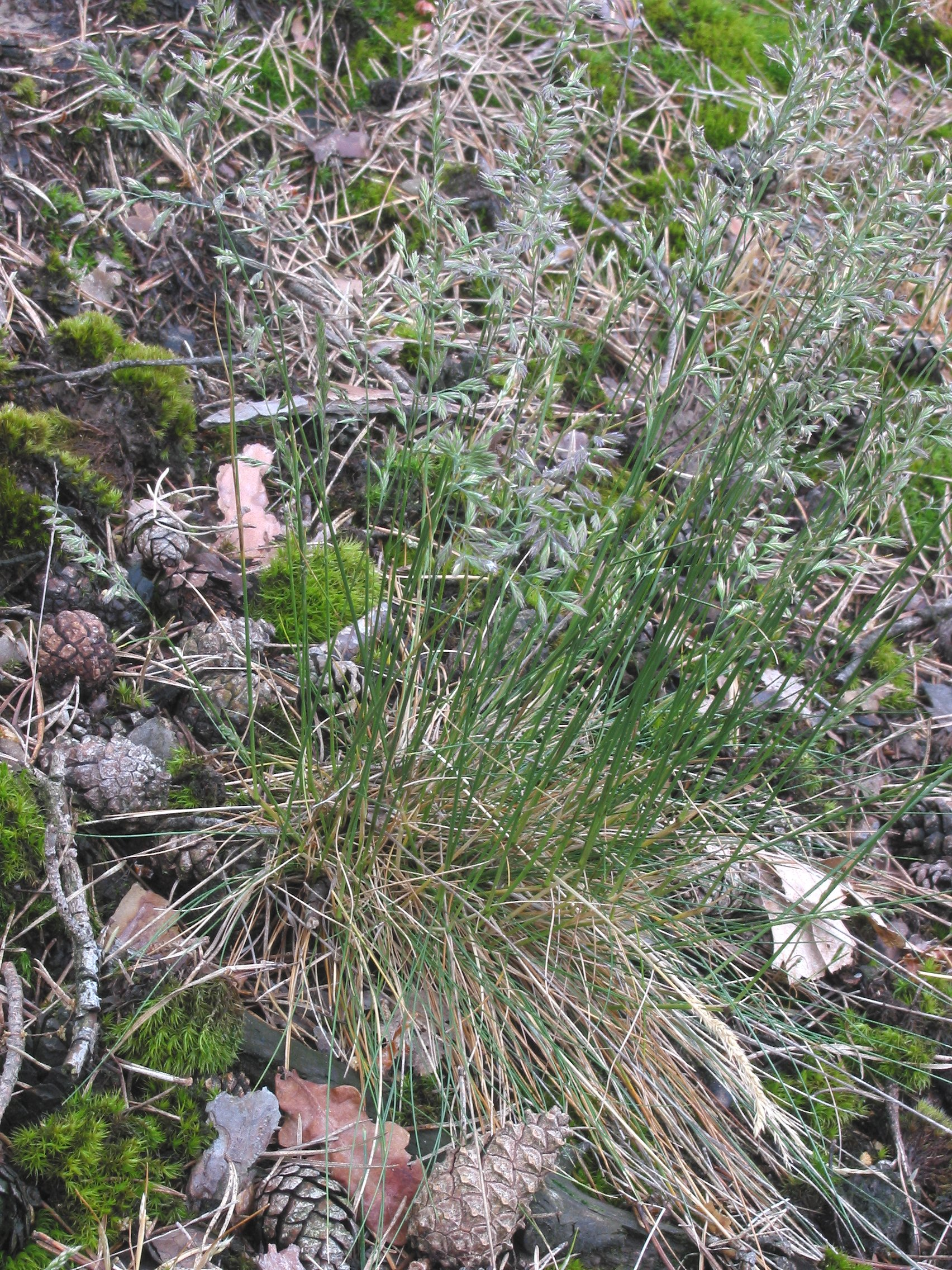
Festuca ovina subsp. hirtula plants

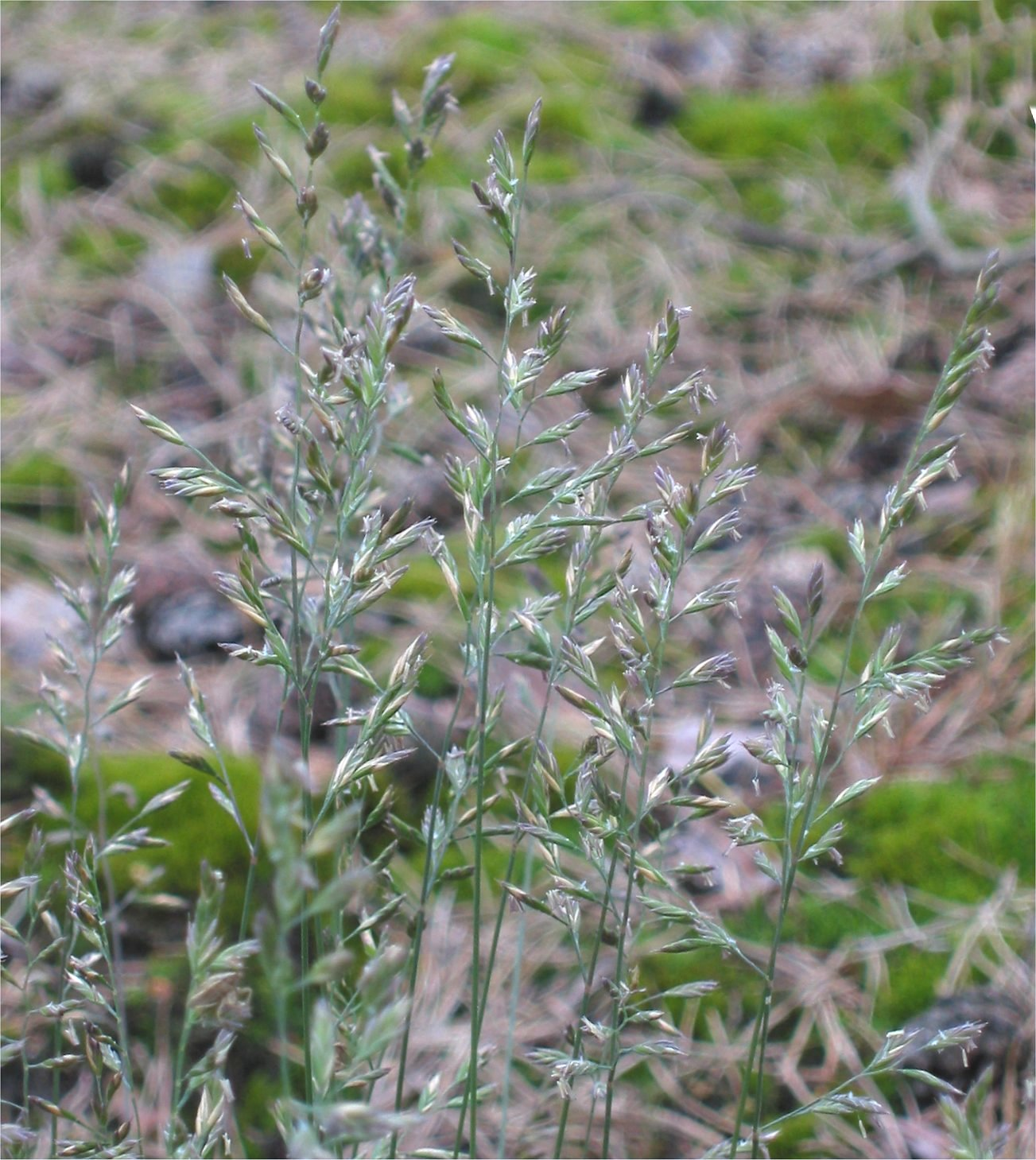
Festuca ovina subsp. hirtula inflorescens

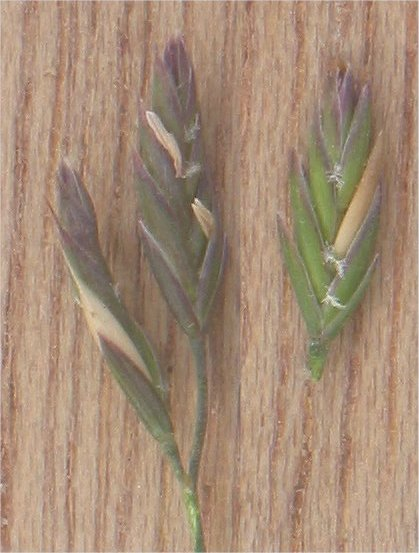
Festuca ovina subsp. hirtula spikelets

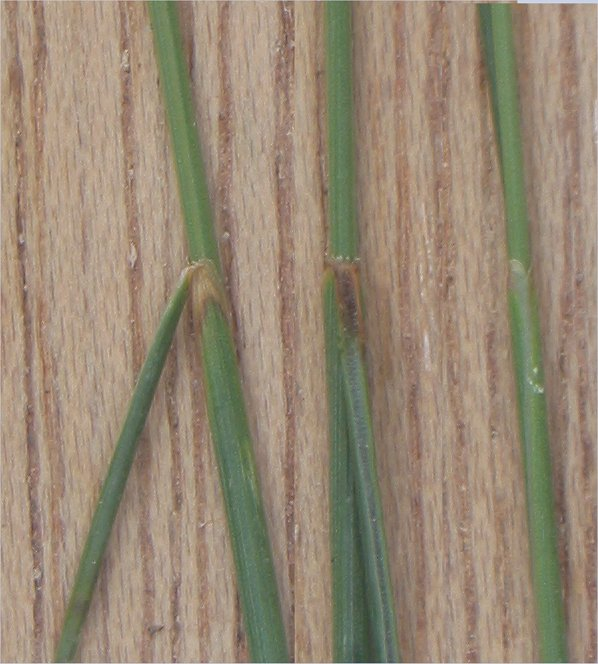
Festuca ovina subsp. hirtula ligula

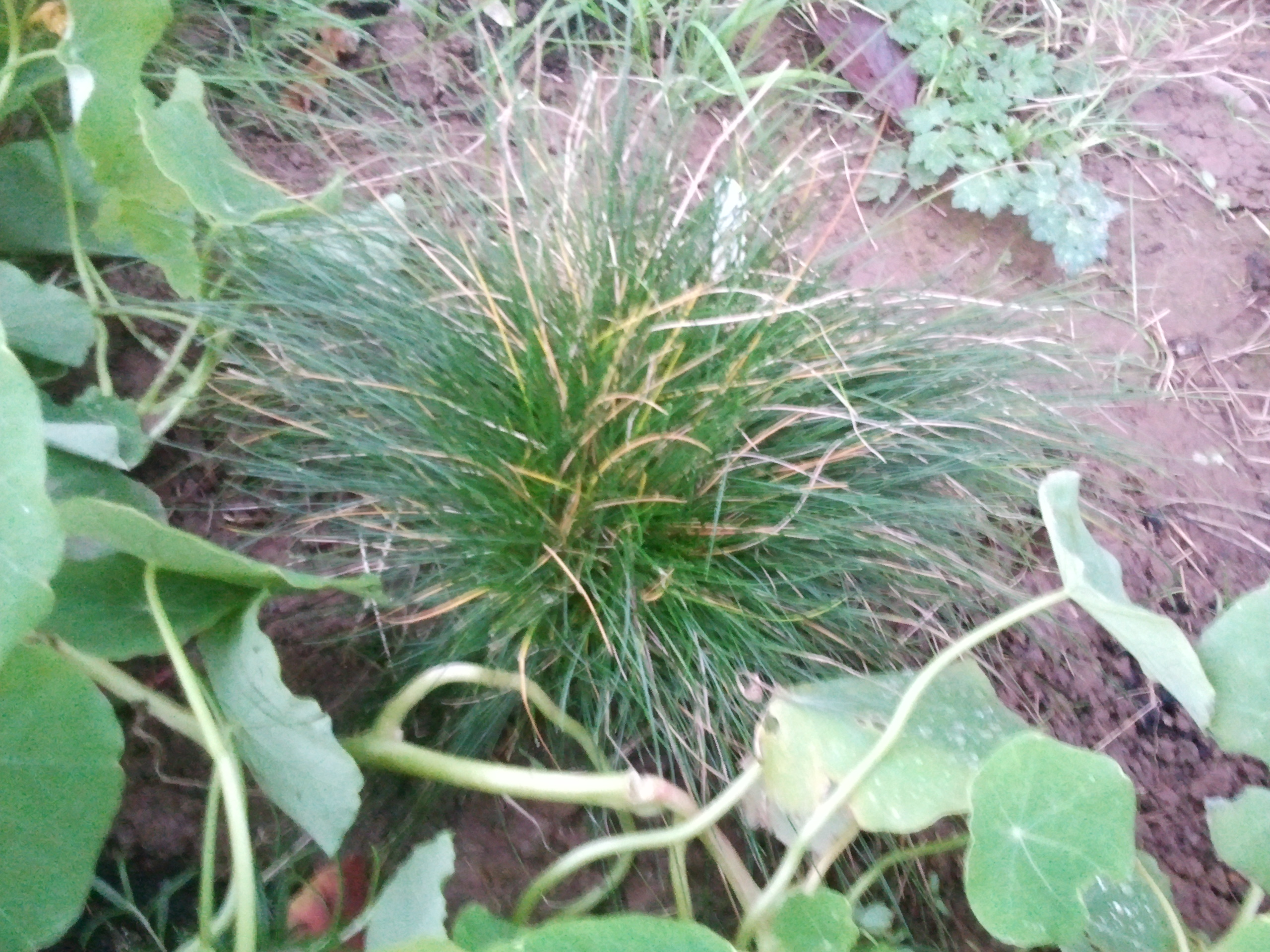
Showing its tufted nature

== Illustrations ==
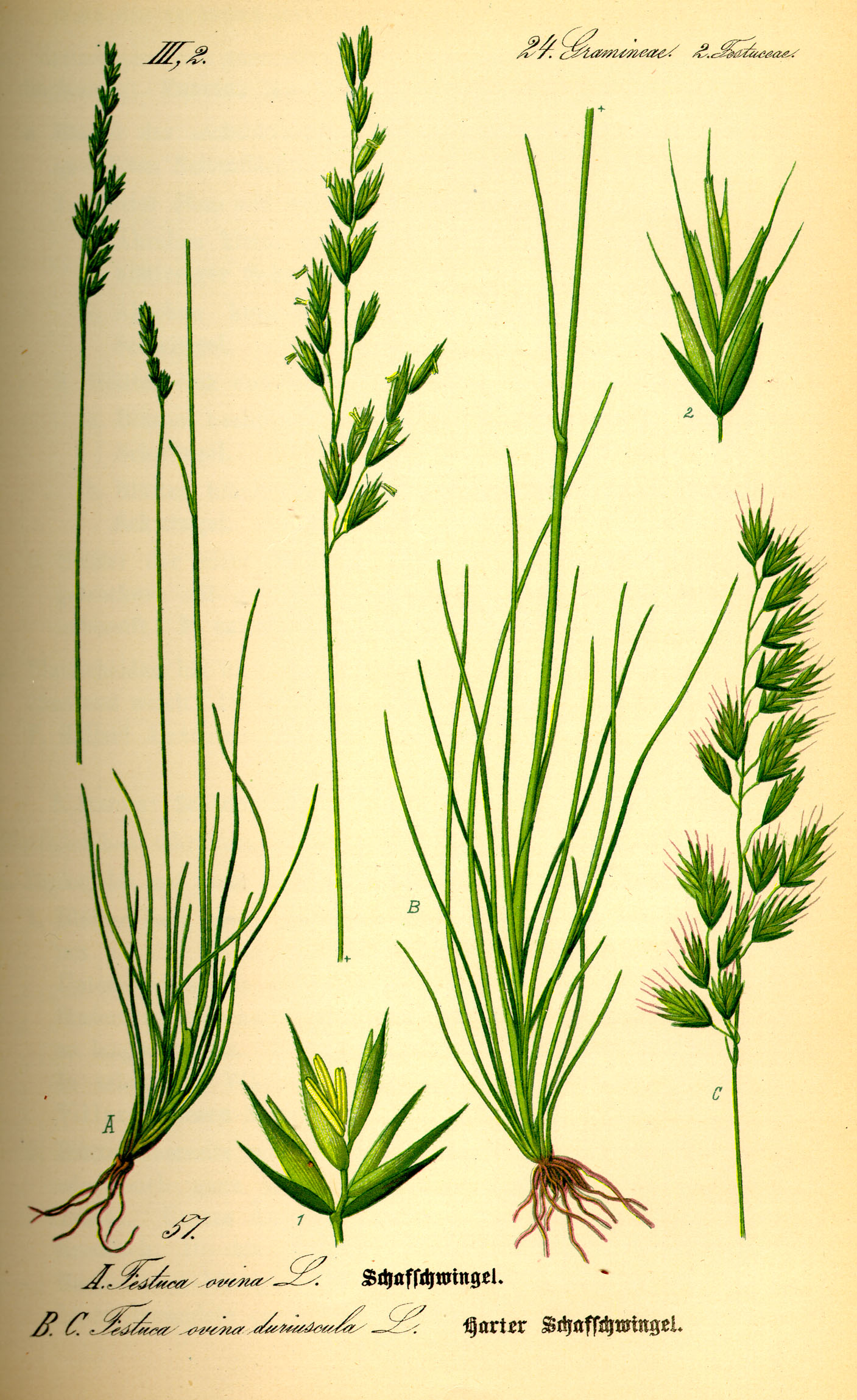

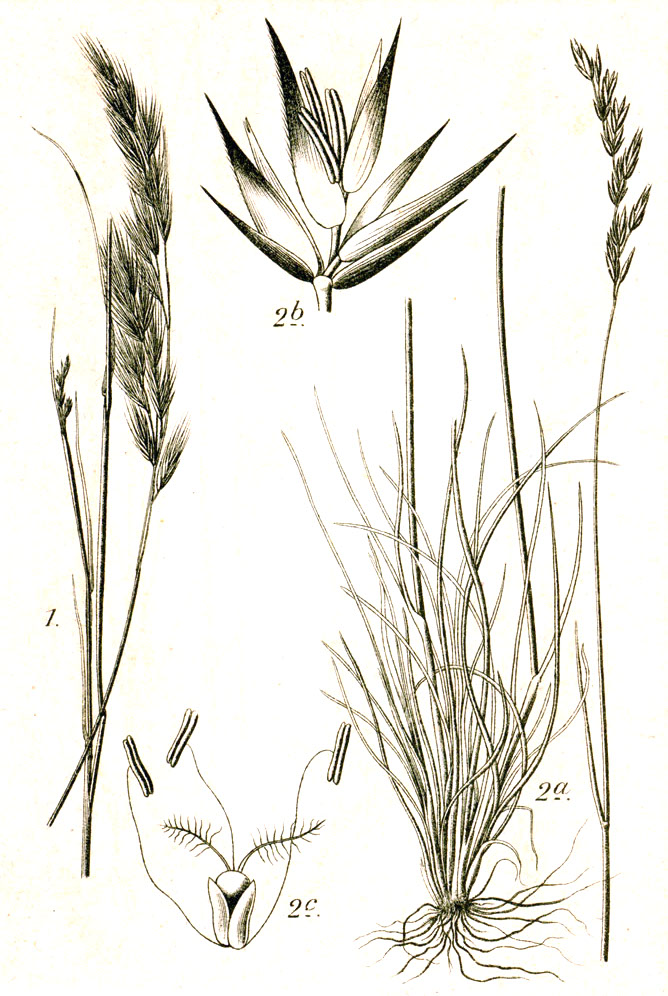
