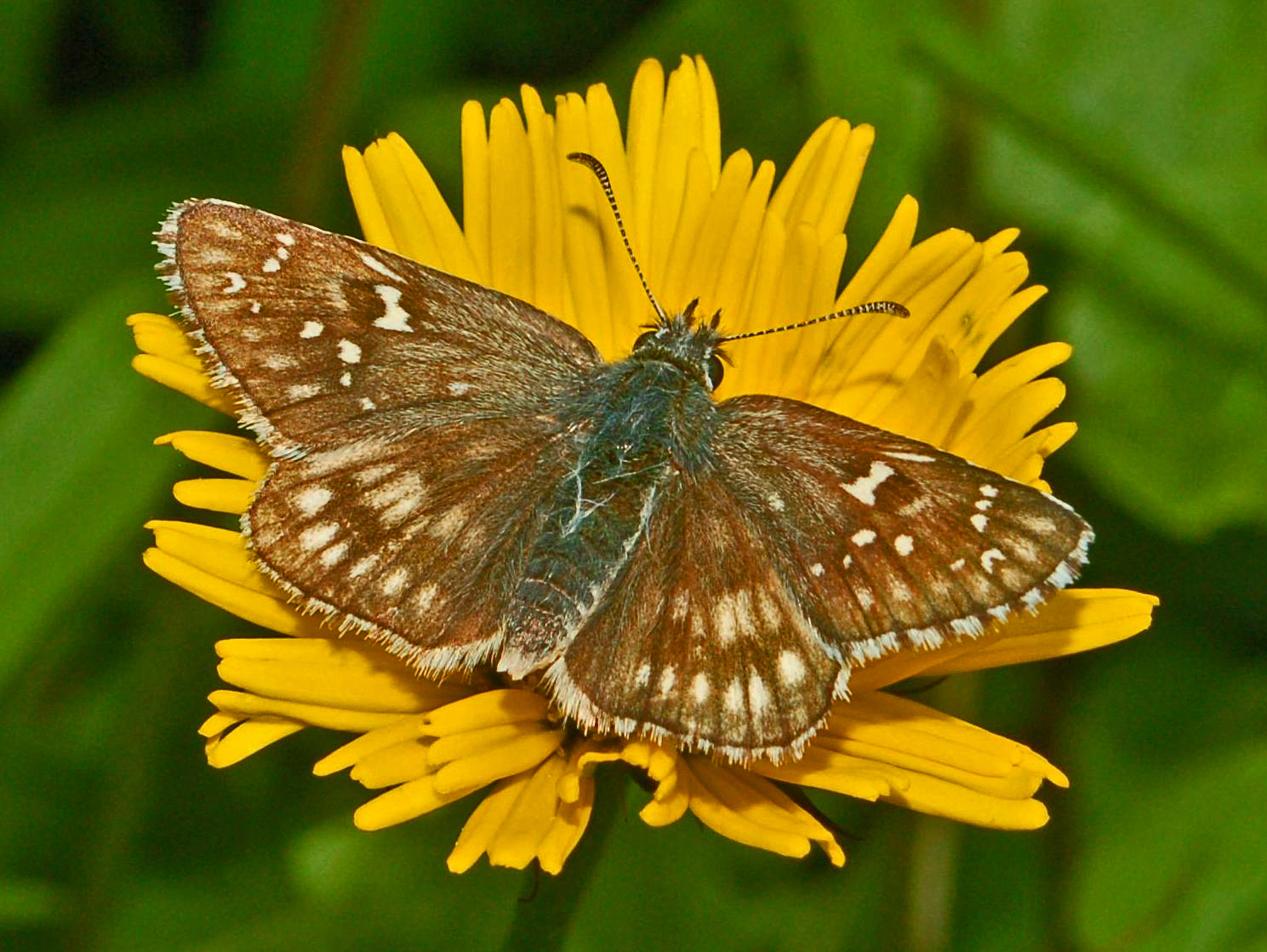
- Pyrgus carthami, upperside
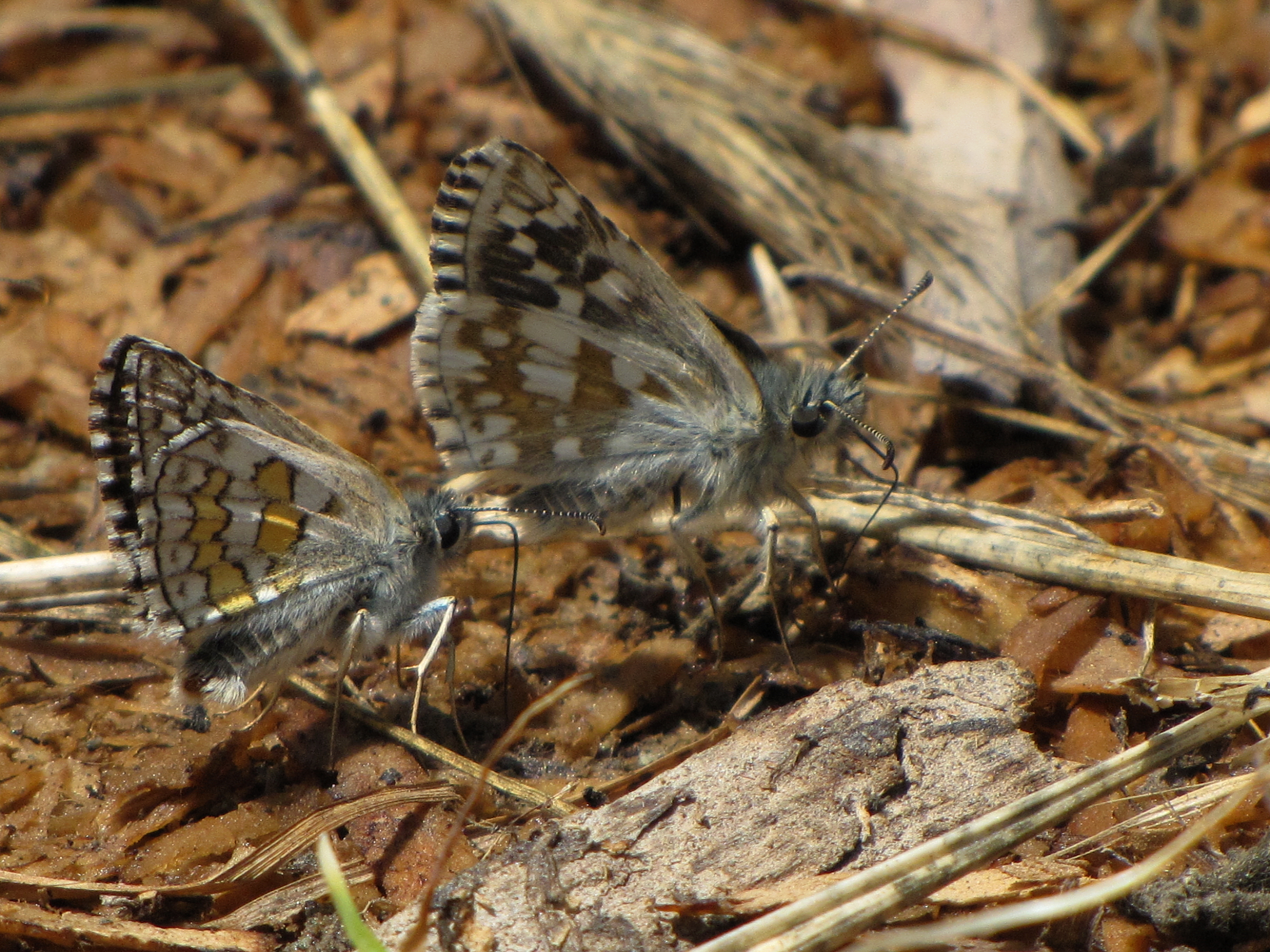
- Pyrgus sidae and Pyrgus carthami, underside

Scientific classification
- Kingdom: Animalia
- Phylum: Arthropoda
- Class: Insecta
- Order: Lepidoptera
- Family: Hesperiidae
- Genus: Pyrgus
- Species: P. carthami

Binomial name
- Pyrgus carthami (Hübner, 1813)

Synonyms
- List: Hesperia carthami (Hübner, 1813); Papilio carthami Hübner, 1813; Papilio fritillarius Poda, 1761; Pyrgus fritillarius (Poda, 1761); Syrichthus carthami (Hübner, 1813); Syrichtus carthami (Hübner, 1813)

= Safflower skipper =

Species of skipper butterfly

The safflower skipper (Pyrgus carthami) is a species of skipper butterfly (family Hesperiidae).

== Description ==
The wingspan is 30–34 mm. The female being on average slightly larger than the male. This species is typical of the genus and it is the largest European Pyrgus. The upperside of the wings is greyish-brown. On the upperside of the forewing there are a basal grey and white fringe of hair and variable quadrangular white patches, with a cell spot in the form of a Greek capital sigma (Σ). The upperside hindwing shows a submarginal line of white spots and a postdiscal line of oval whitish spots. The underside of the forewings is lighter, greenish-brown with white markings, while in the hindwings there are large brown and white patches bordered with dark grey and a white submarginal area. The caterpillar is mainly olive-brown to beige with a blackish chest.

This species is rather similar to Pyrgus alveus, Pyrgus armoricanus, Pyrgus serratulae and Pyrgus malvae. It can be difficult to separate this species from its congeners. It is most often confused with the large grizzled skipper (P. alveus) as the two species are often found in similar habitats. P. carthami can usually be separated from this species by the more closely grouped white spots on the forewing and a band of evenly sized pale spots in the postdiscal area of the hindwing.

== Range ==
Pyrgus carthami is distributed from the Iberian Peninsula to the Balkans and Central Europe (here up to a maximum of 54 degrees of latitude). In the east, the distribution extends to the southern Urals and the northwestern Caucasus. This species is absent from North Africa, peninsular Italy, northern France, the British Isles, and Scandinavia.

== Habitat ==
It frequents dry, sunny slopes, clearings, meadows, and other grassy places. However, the main habitats of Pyrgus carthami are mostly dry grasslands. On the Mainfränkische Platten (Bavaria) these are in particular Carex humilis-dominated dry grasslands. In many cases, these are also locations with open rocks and gravel heaps on former shell limestone mining areas. In this natural area there are rocky locations, especially on corrugated limestone, in the Franconian Jura on Malm or along dolomite rocks. The imagos stay largely in the larval habitat or in its immediate vicinity.

== Ecology ==
A single generation is produced each year. It overwinters in the caterpillar stage. The adult is on the wing from May until September. However, in central Europe the flight period extends from the beginning of May to mid-July, rarely until the beginning of August. The annual flight period of a population is, however, much shorter and extends usually over a period of four weeks. Most of the butterfly observations are in June. The reports decrease towards the end of June.

Typical egg-laying sites and caterpillar sites are exposed to strong sunlight, but are not only found on slopes facing south or west, but can also be on flat surfaces. They have little plant cover with high proportions of raw soil, rocks or weathered gravel. The sparse vegetation sometimes consists only of individual cinquefoil cushions. Also, newly created embankments, for example, in the course of road construction work from lime shards, are used as larval habitat after the host plant has settled. Even in the best of habitats, multiple butterflies are rarely seen. This is due on the one hand to the fast flight and the good camouflage of the butterflies when sitting, which makes them difficult to find, but on the other hand also to the low densities even in optimal habitats. Although in some parts of its range, Pyrgus carthami is fairly common, the males show a sitting behavior when looking for a partner and after disturbance occupy their territories again, even if not always at the same seat guard. In their surroundings, they regularly fly over sparsely vegetated areas.

So far, only Potentilla incana has been documented as a larval food plant from Bavaria. In addition, oviposition observations have also been made of Potentilla verna agg. and Potentilla heptaphylla, which should also be used as food plants. Within the range of the species, the larvae also feed on Alcea, Malva sylvestris, Potentilla pedata, Potentilla neumanniana, Potentilla argentea, Althaea officinalis, Althea hirsuta, and Centaurea species.

The egg-laying takes place preferentially on the underside of the leaf of Potentilla incana, which is proven in Bavaria from both main distribution areas in Main Franconia as well as the Middle Franconian Alb. While in Main Franconia pre-imaginal stadiums have so far only been obtained on this cinquefoil, which occurs here in larger populations, in the Middle Franconian Jura evidently Potentilla neumanniana and Potentilla heptaphylla are also used sporadically. In the latter region, Potentilla incana also occurs much less frequently and locally. In the Palatinate, eggs and caterpillars were also detected in an extremely xerothermic location on Potentilla neumanniana. The overwintering usually takes place in the fourth and penultimate caterpillar stage, but this can vary depending on the altitude. It pupates in rolled leaves of host plants or on the ground. The pupal stage last up to 14 days.

The caterpillars can easily be found in suitable places, so that this species can be easily detected by means of a targeted larval search in late summer. Typical is a bag-shaped dwelling, which the caterpillars first build from a leaflet and later from several leaves. This is where the food intake takes place and at the same time it offers good protection against solar radiation and predators. The imagos are regular visitors to flowers and prefer to suckle on yellow-flowering plants such as Hippocrepis comosa and Lotus corniculatus agg.

The altitude distribution in Bavaria extends from approx. 170 m in Main Franconia to around 560 m in the Franconian Jura and should correspond to the height range in which the species also has reproduction habitats. A clear core distribution lies between 200 m and 400 m. Pyrgus carthami thus has a narrow height distribution and is limited to lower altitudes. However it can be found from sea level to 1900 m in the south of its range.

== Conservation ==
The most important protective measure consists in the preservation and promotion of the dry grassland populated by P. carthami. It is also important to ensure that no nutrients are introduced from adjacent areas. In addition, de-bushing in rocky areas and the withdrawal of afforestation can lead to an enlargement of the habitats. Artificial embankments made of stony excavation material, which are created e.g. as part of road construction measures, should not be planted and can then offer a new habitat.

== Etymology ==
Carthamus, distaff thistles.

== Taxonomy ==
Subspecies

- Pyrgus carhami carthami (central and northern Germany)
- Pyrgus carthami nevadensis (western Germany, France, the Iberian Peninsula)
- Pyrgus carthami moeschleri (southern and eastern Europe)

Synonyms:

Papilio fritillarius Poda, 1761

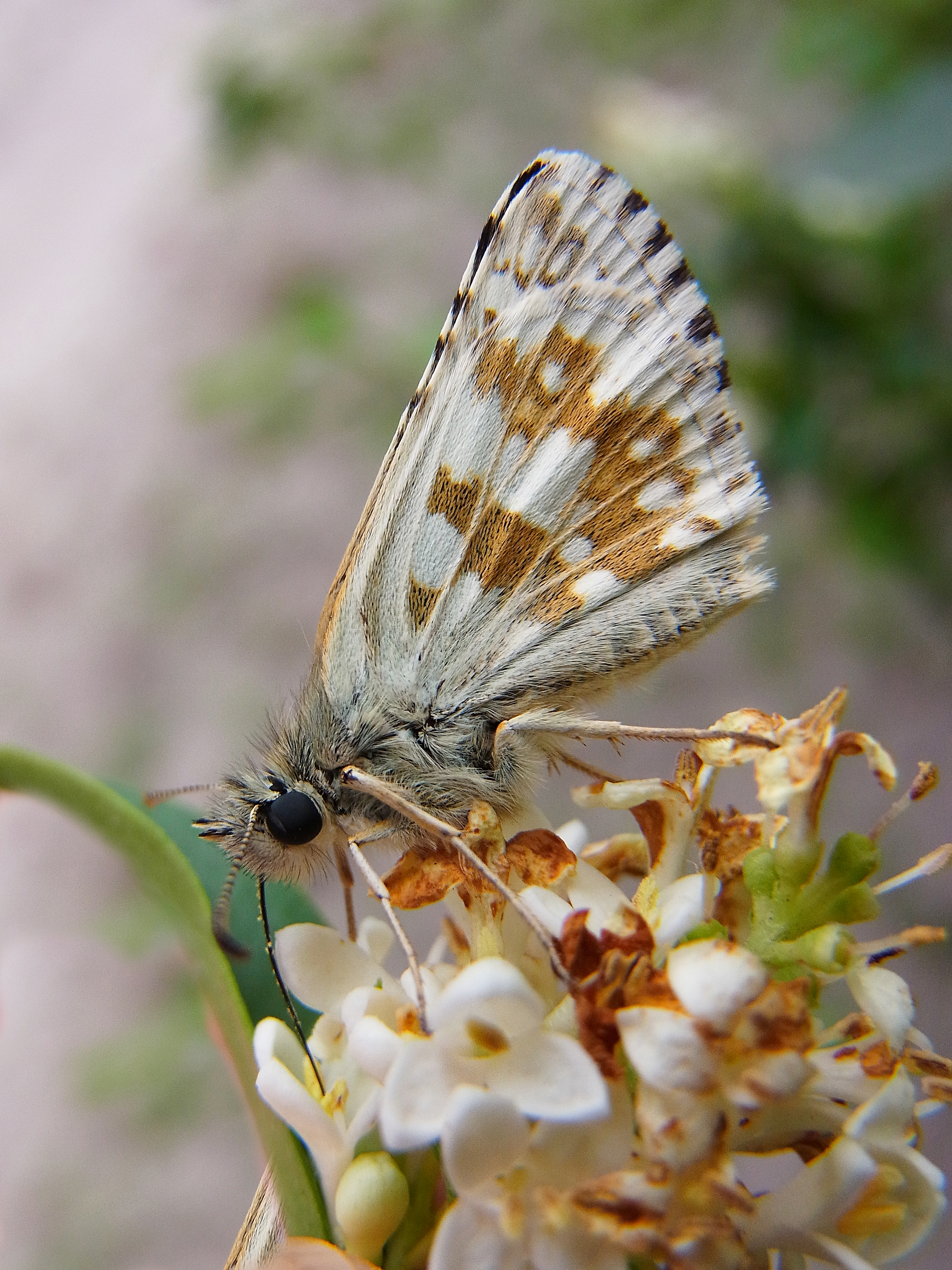
Safflower skipper

== Bibliography ==
- Whalley, Paul - Mitchell Beazley Guide to Butterflies (1981, reprinted 1992) ISBN 0-85533-348-0
- Tom Tolman & Richard Lewington, Guide des papillons d'Europe et d'Afrique du Nord, Delachaux et Niestlé, 1997 (ISBN 978-2-603-01649-7)
- De Jong, R. 1972. "Systematics and geographic history of the genus Pyrgus in the palearctic region (Lep., Hesp.)". Tijdschrift voor Entomologie, 115 (1): 1-120.
