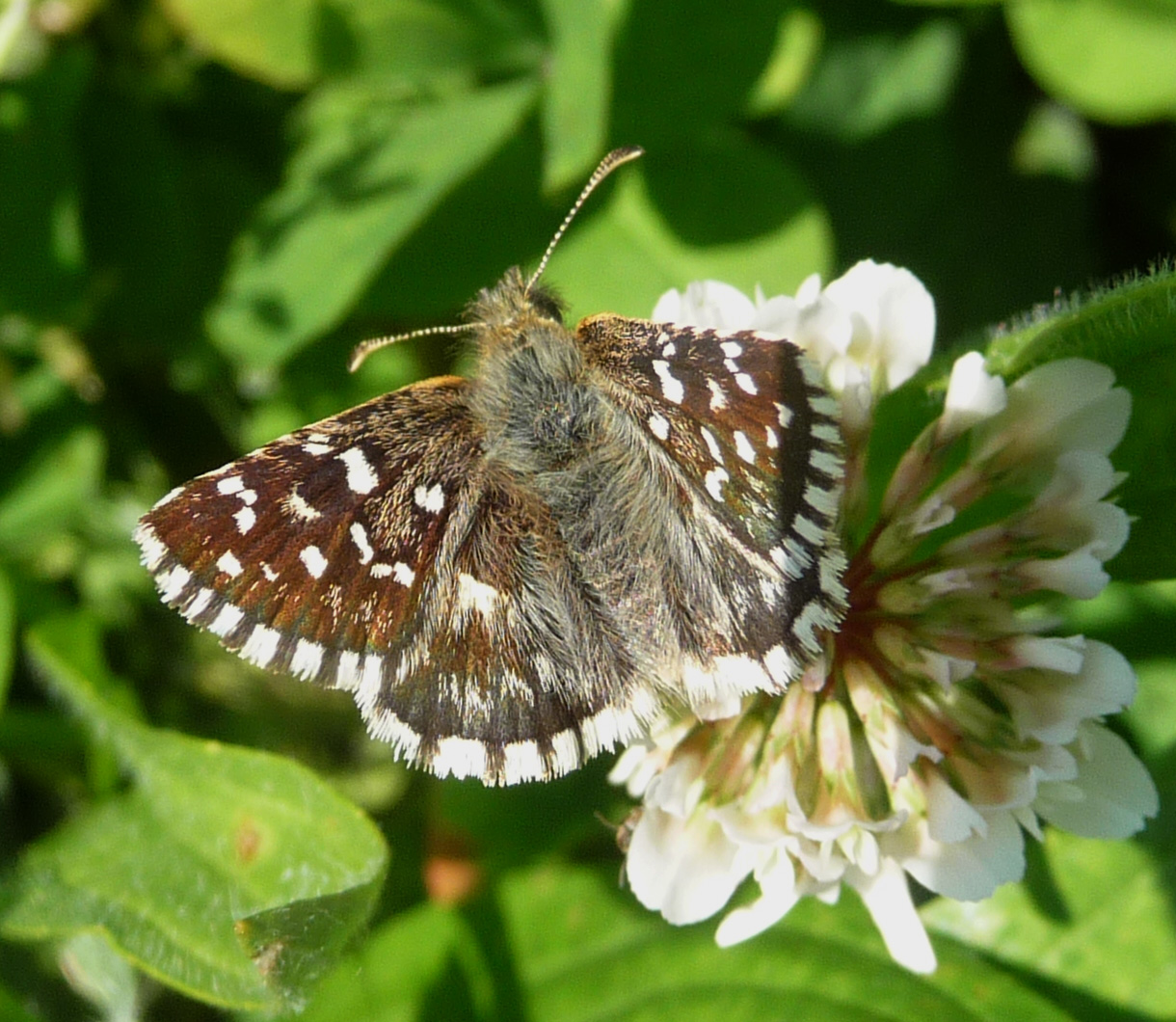
- Male

Conservation status
- Near Threatened (IUCN 3.1)

Scientific classification
- Kingdom: Animalia
- Phylum: Arthropoda
- Clade: Pancrustacea
- Class: Insecta
- Order: Lepidoptera
- Family: Hesperiidae
- Genus: Pyrgus
- Species: P. malvoides

Binomial name
- Pyrgus malvoides (Elwes & Edwards, 1897)

Synonyms
- Hesperia malvoides Elwes & Edwards, 1897

= Pyrgus malvoides =

Southern grizzled skipper

Species of skipper butterfly genus Pyrgus

Pyrgus malvoides, the southern grizzled skipper, is a species of skipper (family Hesperiidae).

== Description ==
The wingspan of this butterfly is 24–26 mm. Pyrgus malvoides cannot be distinguished from Pyrgus malvae by external characteristics, but this is quite possible on the basis of the genital structures (H. malvoides Elw. Markings as in malvae; tergite of anal segment (male) with a tooth on each side).

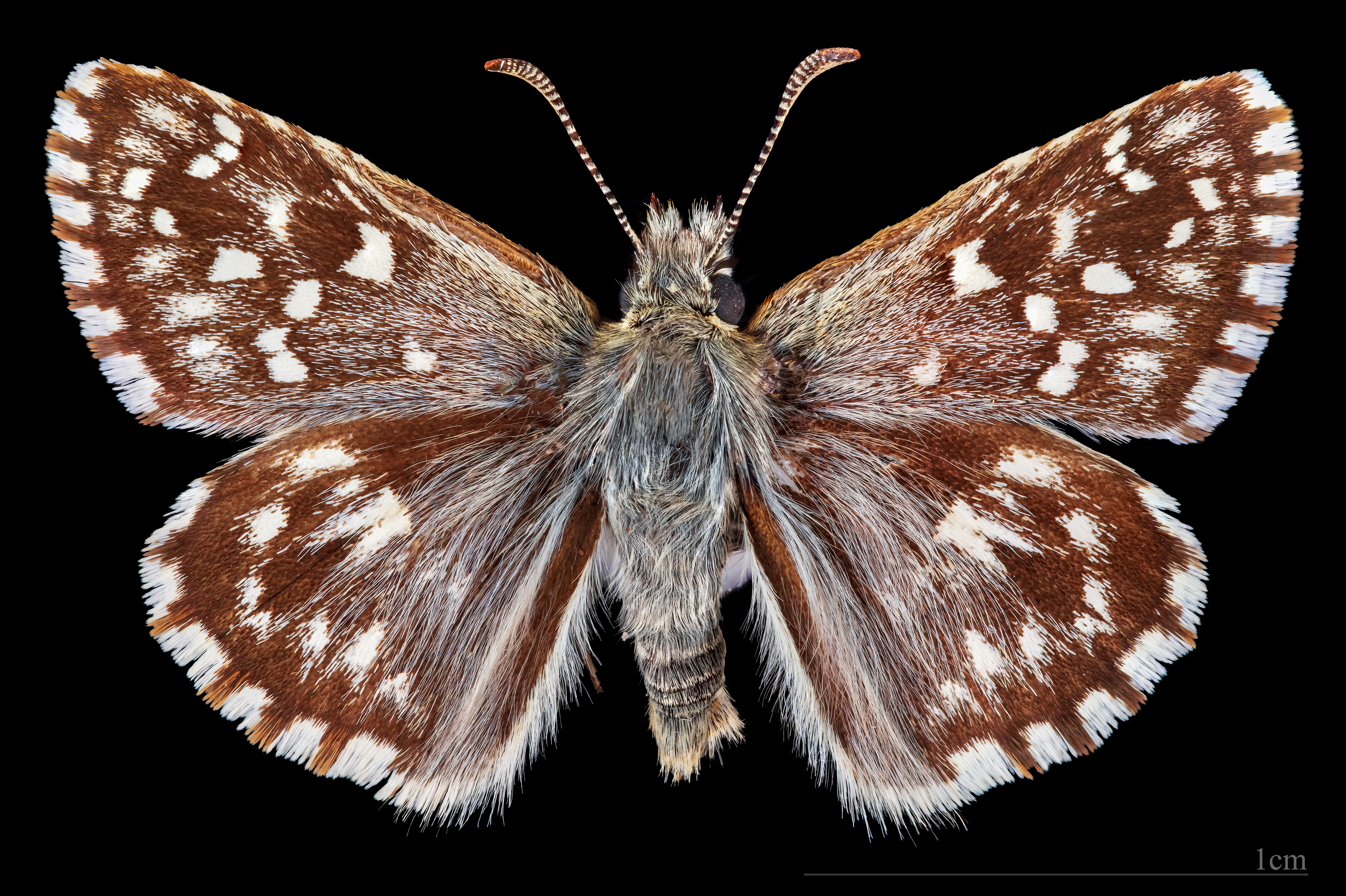
Pyrgus malvoide ♂

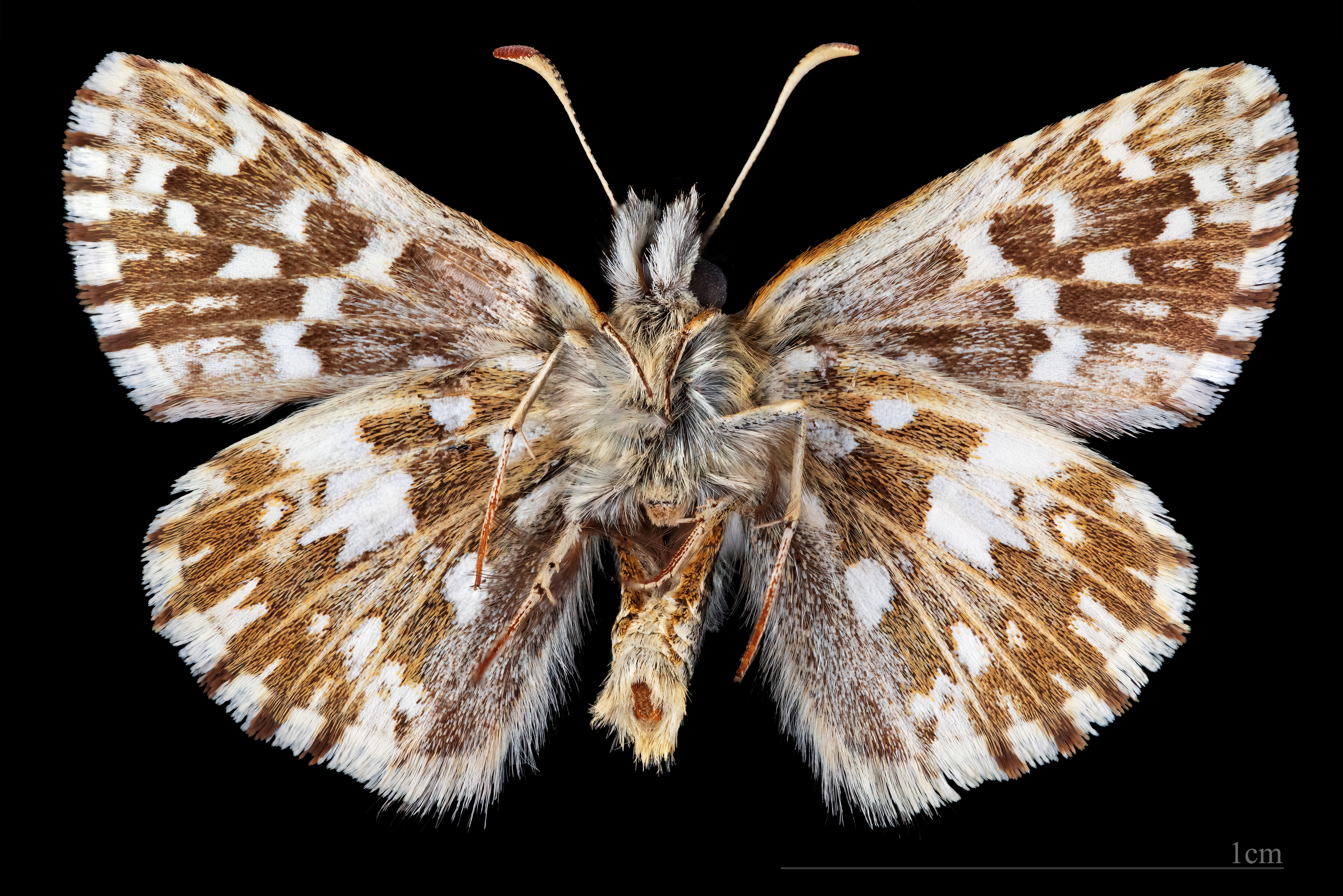
Pyrgus malvoide ♂ △

From the other species of the genus Pyrgus, both species can be clearly differentiated by the presence of the mostly clear submarginal points on the upper side of the wing.

== Range ==
Pyrgus malvoides is distributed from Portugal and Spain via southern and central France, southern Switzerland (south of the main Alpine ridge) and Austria (Vorarlberg, Tyrol) to Italy and Istria.

== Habitat ==
According to previous knowledge, Pyrgus malvoides colonizes various fresh and above all moist habitats in the Alps if these have structures that are favorable to the microclimate, such as open ground on gravel, rocks, obstructions from cattle kicking or erosion, etc. A syntopic occurrence with Pyrgus malvae could not be determined so far. Because of the identification problems in the field, no sucking plants were noted. It is assumed that there are no essential differences to Pyrgus malvae here.

The known altitudinal distribution extends from 800 m to about 2000 m in Bavaria. It is found up to heights of 2500 m in the central Alps.

== Ecology ==
Adults are on wing from April to September. In Bavaria Pyrgus malvoides flies in one generation from around mid-May to mid-July. A second or even third generation per year, as described e.g. in Italy, was not observed in Bavaria.

The larvae feed on Potentilla, Agrimonia and Fragaria species, but primarily Potentilla erecta. It is reported from Switzerland that the caterpillars have been found on various cinquefoil species (Potentilla neumanniana [= tabernaemontani], Potentilla pusilla, Potentilla erecta) and have eaten Fragaria vesca during breeding.

Proven forage plants of the caterpillars are:

Potentilla tabernaemontani (= Potentilla neumanniana, Potentilla verna) [Switzerland, France], Potentilla pusilla [Switzerland, France, Italy], Potentilla erecta [Switzerland, Spain], Potentilla aurea [Austria], Potentilla reptans [France, Italy, Spain], Potentilla rupestris [Switzerland], Potentilla argentea [France], Potentilla grandiflora [Switzerland], Potentilla hirta [France], Potentilla pensylvanica [Spain], Potentilla recta [Spain], Fragaria vesca [Spain, Switzerland], Alchemilla hybrida [Switzerland], Agrimonia eupatoria [France, Spain], Filipendula vulgaris [Spain], Geum montanum [Spain], Rubus caesius [Spain], Rubus idaeus [Switzerland, France, Italy], Rubus ulmifolius [Spain], Sanguisorba minor [Switzerland, Spain]. The information in the above list comes mainly from the combination of Hernández-Roldán et al. (2012). The range of food plants is very similar to that of the sister species Pyrgus malvae. Only Rosaceae and, above all, various Potentilla species are used.

The caterpillars develop quite slowly and can therefore still be found on their food plants in midsummer, often several on one plant.

== Conservation ==
In Switzerland, Pyrgus malvoides is called a typical representative of the rough meadows and pastures. In Bavaria, too, the species was found in wet meadows, extensive pastures and wet grasslands. A threat can only be assumed if traditional extensive cultivation gives way to intensive use or if the meadows are left without use.

== Taxonomy ==
The southern grizzled skipper is also very closely related to the grizzled skipper and has not been separated by significant isolation reproductive barriers. These two species cannot be differentiated according to external characteristics. Regarding their genitalia, however, they differ significantly. And while P. malvoides usually develops two generations per year, the second generation of P. malvae is a very rare exception. The two species can be crossed with each other, but in nature there is only a very narrow band with hybrid finds - otherwise the taxa are spatially clearly separated. P. malvoides is therefore often listed as a (southwestern) subspecies of P. malvae - but mostly as an independent species because of the narrow and constant band of hybrids. Imagos of the species pair from Portugal, Spain, southern France and Italy, but also southern Switzerland and the parts of Austria mentioned, always belong to P. malvoides, those from Germany (with very few exceptions in the border area), from Scandinavia or Poland and northern Switzerland, as well but from Greece to European Russia (and further through Asia) always to Pyrgus malvae. A genital examination is only necessary in the narrow contact belt of the two species.
