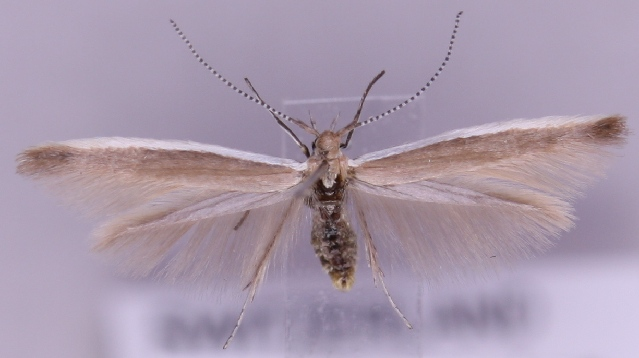

Scientific classification
- Kingdom: Animalia
- Phylum: Arthropoda
- Class: Insecta
- Order: Lepidoptera
- Family: Coleophoridae
- Genus: Coleophora
- Species: C. albicostella

Binomial name
- Coleophora albicostella (Duponchel, 1842)

Synonyms
- Ornix albicostella Duponchel, 1842; Coleophora approximata Gozmany, 1956

= Coleophora albicostella =

Species of moth

Coleophora albicostella is a moth of the family Coleophoridae. It is found from Latvia to the Iberian Peninsula, Italy, Greece and Cyprus.

The larvae feed on Fragaria vesca, Potentilla cinerea, Potentilla palustris and Potentilla tabaernaemontani. Larvae can be found from autumn to May.
