= P. incana =

P. incana may refer to:

- Pineda incana, a flowering plant species native to the Andes of Ecuador and Peru
- Potentilla incana, a synonym for Potentilla arenaria, a plant species

== See also ==
- Incana (disambiguation)
