= Leonard Doncaster =

English geneticist (1877–1920)

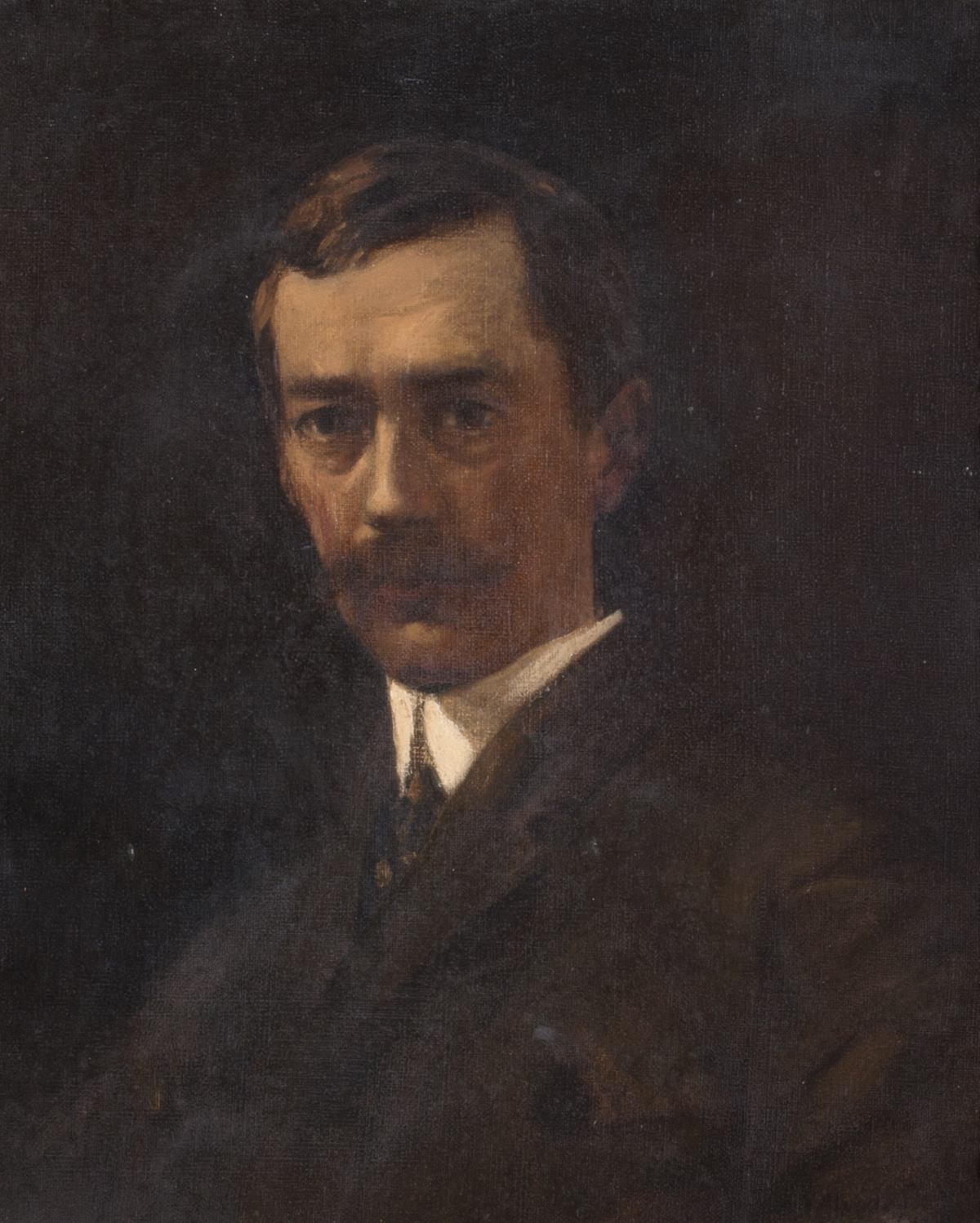
- Doncaster in 1920
- Born: 31 December 1877; Sheffield, England
- Died: 28 May 1920 (aged 42)
- Education: University of Cambridge
- Known for: Discovery of sex linkage
- Awards: Elected as Fellow of the Royal Society of London, 1915
- Scientific career
- Fields: Genetics, lepidopterology, animal breeding
- Workplaces: King's College, Birmingham University, University of Liverpool

Leonard Doncaster (31 December 1877 – 28 May 1920) was an English geneticist and a lecturer on zoology at both Birmingham University and the University of Liverpool whose research work was largely based on insects.

== Early life ==
Doncaster was born on 31 December 1877 in Abbeydale, Sheffield. His father was Samuel Doncaster, an iron merchant, of Abbeydale, Sheffield, Yorkshire.

== Career ==
After education at Leighton Park School in Reading South England he studied at King's College, Cambridge, from 1896 onward. He was Scholar of natural sciences in 1898, and Walsingham Medallist in 1902. In June 1902 he was appointed assistant to the Superintendent of the Cambridge University Museum of Zoology, From 1906-10 he was a Lecturer in Zoology at Birmingham University.

He was an early Mendelian geneticist who discovered sex linkage, while writing up breeding experiment results of the Reverend G.H. Raynor on the magpie moth Abraxas grossulariata published in 1906. He wrote a number of books on Mendelian genetics and on sex determination. His book Heredity in the Light of Recent Research (1910), is notable for explicitly dismissing Lamarckian inheritance. In 1909 he returned to Cambridge University and acted as Superintendent of the Museum of Zoology from 1909 to 1914. He became University Lecturer in Zoology in 1914 and won the Trail Medal of Linneaean Society in 1915. In 1915, he was also elected to the Royal Society of London.

During the First World War he served as a bacteriologist to the First Eastern General Hospital, Cambridge, and later in the Friends' Ambulance Unit at Dunkirk, as he was a Quaker.

After WWI he was Professor of Zoology at Liverpool University from 1919 until his death in 1920. He died at age 42 of sarcoma in Liverpool. William Bateson wrote his obituary in Nature.

== Publications ==
- Heredity in the Light of Recent Research (1910)
- A review of Heredity and Memory by James Ward (1912)
- The Determination of Sex (1914)
- Some Scientific Difficulties in the Way of Religious Belief (1916)
- An Introduction to the Study of Cytology (1920)

== See also ==
- Sex linkage
- Reciprocal cross
- Sex-limited genes
- Parthenogenesis
- Sex-determination system
- Sexual selection in insects

== Some publications ==
- Doncaster L., Raynor G.H. (1906). "Breeding experiments with Lepidoptera". Proceedings of the Zoological Society of London. 1 (1–2): 125–133. doi:10.1111/j.1469-7998.1906.tb08425.x.
