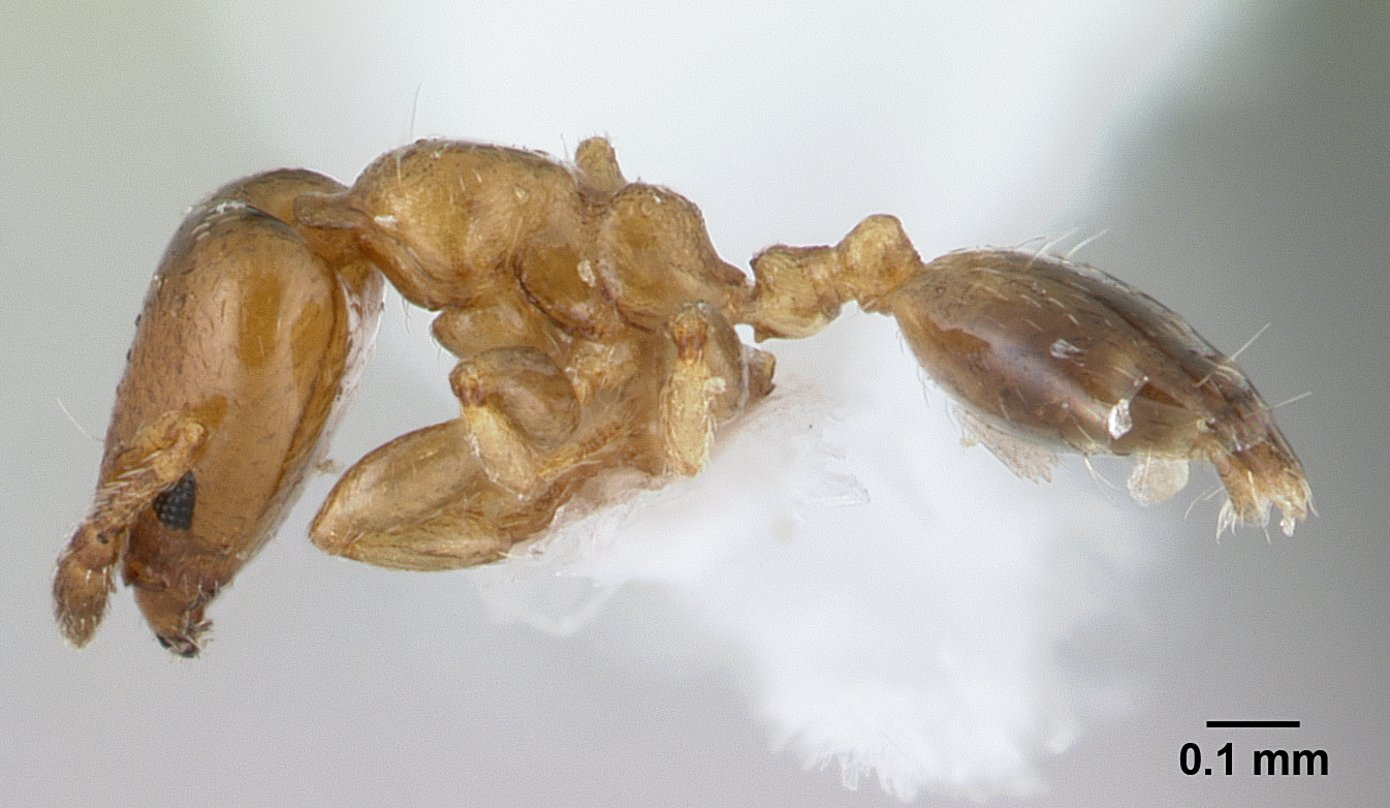
- Xenomyrmex stollii worker from Brazil

Scientific classification
- Kingdom: Animalia
- Phylum: Arthropoda
- Class: Insecta
- Order: Hymenoptera
- Family: Formicidae
- Subfamily: Myrmicinae
- Tribe: Crematogastrini
- Alliance: Cataulacus genus group
- Genus: Xenomyrmex; Forel, 1885

Type species
- Xenomyrmex stollii Forel, 1885

Diversity
- 4 species

Synonyms
- Myrmecinella Wheeler, W.M., 1922

= Xenomyrmex =

Genus of ants

Xenomyrmex is a genus of small ants in the subfamily Myrmicinae. The genus is known from Florida (United States), the West Indies, and from Mexico to at least Panama. They nest in cavities of living or dead plants.

== Species ==
- Xenomyrmex floridanus Emery, 1895
- Xenomyrmex panamanus (Wheeler, 1922)
- Xenomyrmex picquarti (Forel, 1899)
- Xenomyrmex stollii Forel, 1885
