= Sexual selection in insects =

Topic in biology

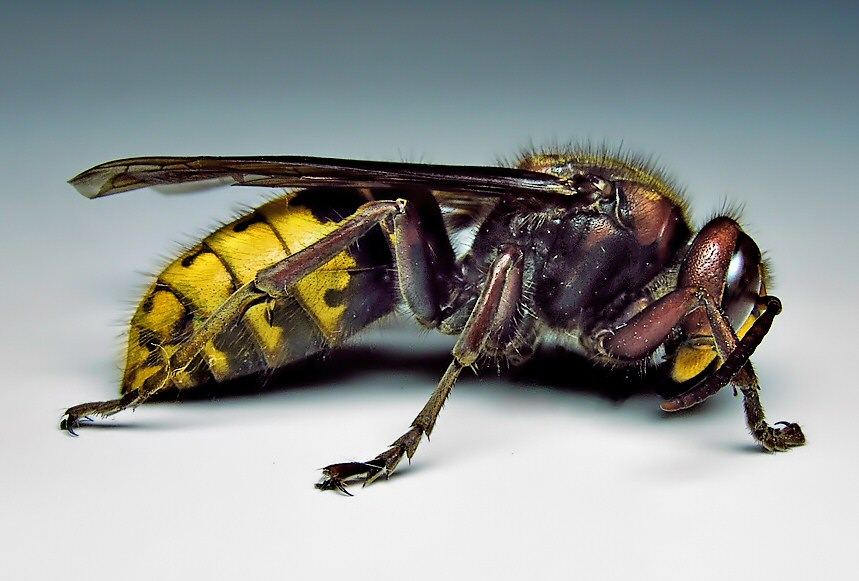
Vespa crabro A social hornet

Sexual selection in insects is about how sexual selection functions in insects. The males of some species have evolved exaggerated adornments and mechanisms for self-defense. These traits play a role in increasing male reproductive expectations by triggering male-male competition or influencing the female mate choice, and can be thought of as functioning on three different levels: individuals, colonies, and populations within an area.

== Male mating tactics ==
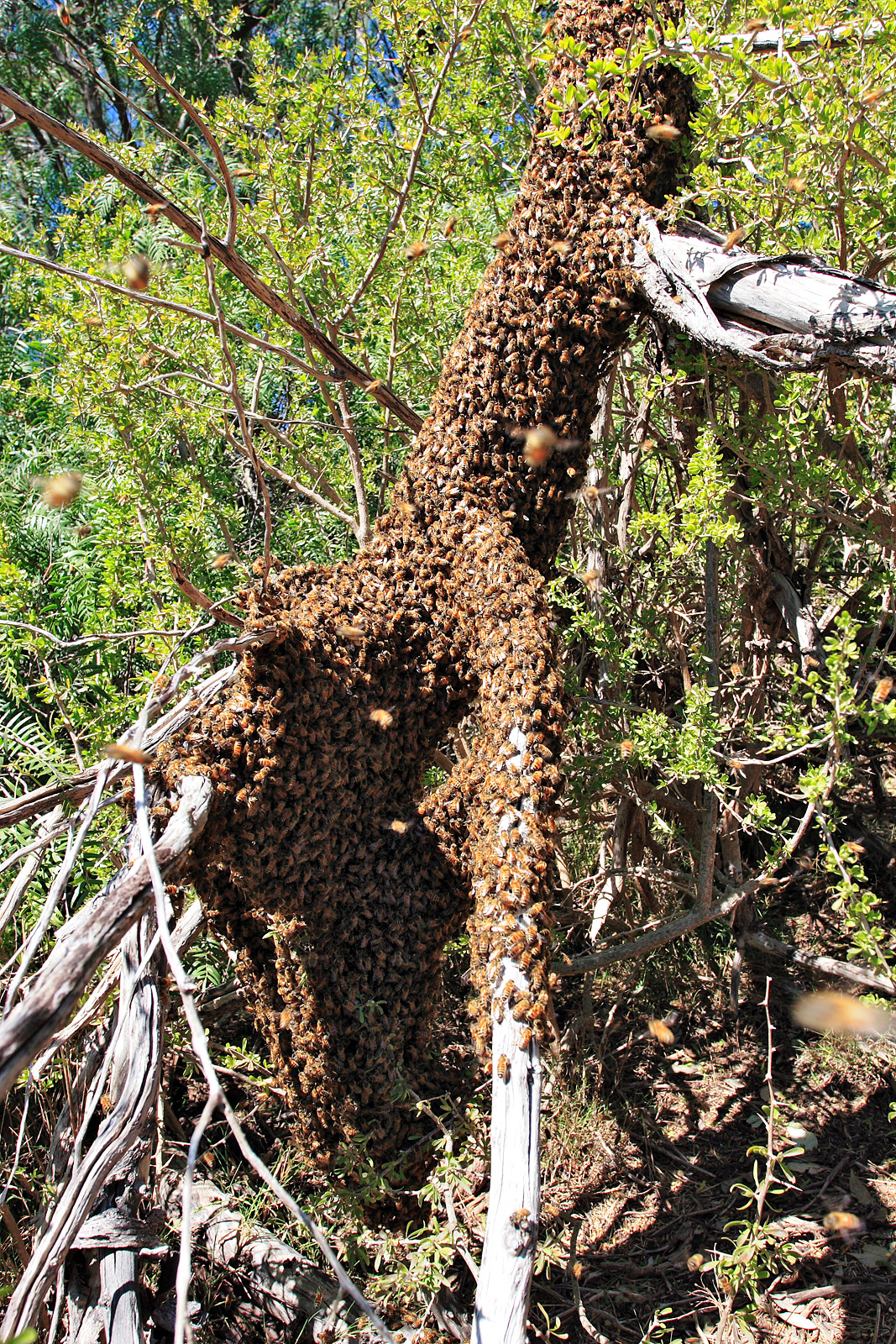
Bee swarm

The amount of space accessible and the time both male and female usually determines the site of copulation. Many hymenopteran males constantly fly around specific sites, usually the tops of tall trees, summits, or along hedges, where approachable females are found as they can also be resources visited by females for the purpose of feeding. In honey bees the queens join the mating area alone and are then pursued by a dynamic swarm of males. Those located in the front of the line usually achieve reproduction success. A queen usually mates with twelve males on an average of two mating flights and stores the sperm throughout her entire lifetime. Colonies sustain many males but only a few queens, so only very few males are able to successfully mate with the queen.

Onthophagus taurus is a species of dung beetle. Competition for fertilisation of females occurs when males engage in trials of strength over the possession of breeding tunnels. This competition is a prominent feature of the mating system of these beetles. When ionizing radiation is applied to males, mutations are induced that reduce the expression of strength-related precopulatory sexual traits such as competition for breeding tunnels. However, sexual selection by females proved sufficient to remove such mutations from progeny after two generations.

== Roles ==
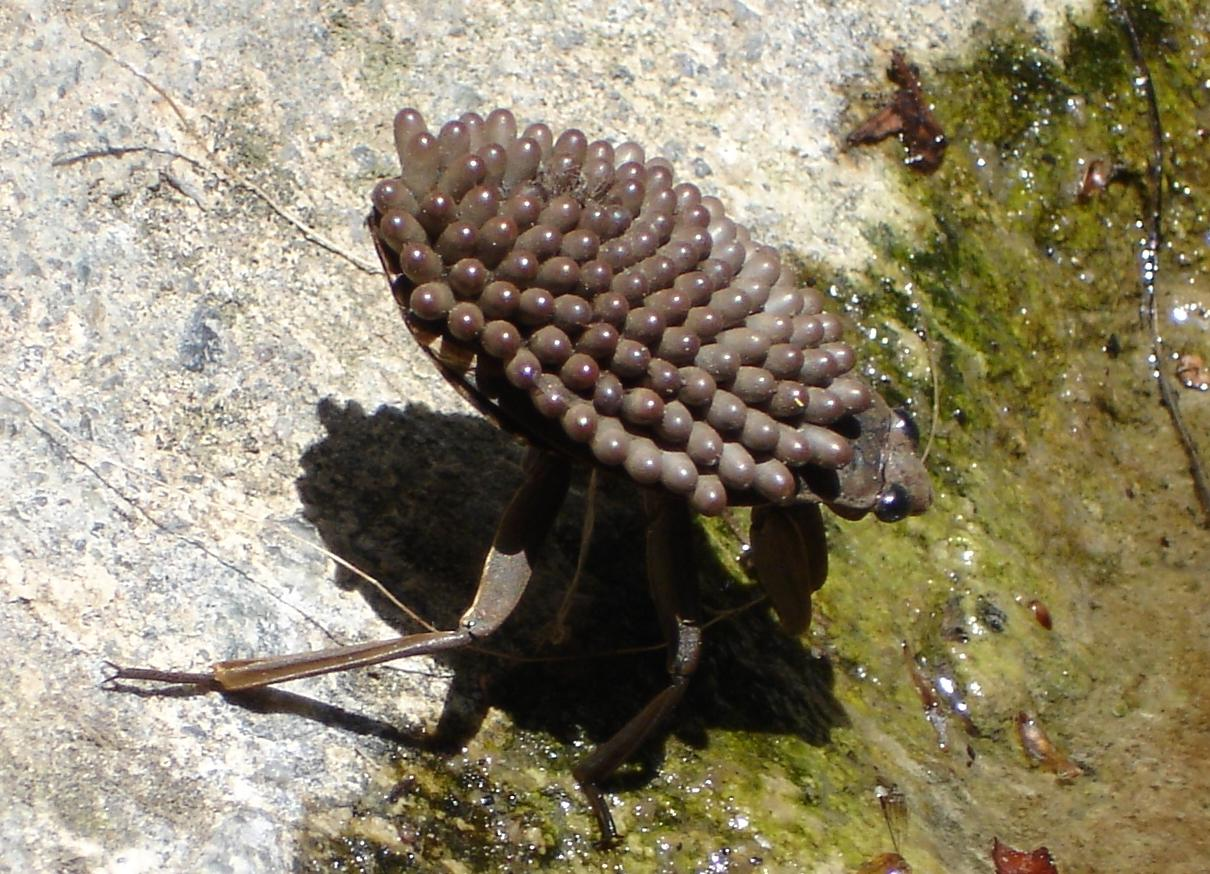
Abedus indentatus belostomatid male with eggs on its back

Males can be choosier than females. As an offering, males are capable of providing nuptial gifts secretions, which can be more expensive than female reproductive investment, parental care, where the reproductive costs in males are higher than in females because they invest large quantities of resources and time after egg fertilization, and foraging and nesting sites to the females. Moreover, these factors decrease their subsequent male reproductive opportunities, and the availability of males. An example of male parental care can be found in belostomatid water bugs, where the male, after fertilizing the eggs, allows the female to glue her eggs onto his back. He broods them until the nymphs hatch 2–4 weeks later. The eggs are large and reduce the ability of the male to fertilize other females and catch prey, and increases its predation risk.

Females are usually in conflict over the acquisition of resources and also tend to compete for male provided resources, thus generating a sex role reversal. Females compete to monopolize parental care, and displace rivals with claspers that appear to be specialized in keeping their hold on males, avoiding takeover attempts by other females.

== Characteristics ==
Male-to-male competition for access to females and for resources that the females require for themselves and their offspring is common and can explain the morphological phenotypic traits and behaviors, such as large body size, weapons, territoriality, and early sexual maturation that increase their possibilities of gaining access to the females. In many social insects, larger males are more competitive and tend to monopolize females or the resources that they need. In bees, females may choose males who are faster, more agile, or more persistent fliers. Sequestering of females and forced copulation may also favor large male size. Males with longer horns and mandibles can use them to fight, or for take over attempts when rivals are copulating. In beetle species, the male horns can be as long as the male's body. Early sexually mature males can start their reproductive life before the rest of the male population. Under scramble competition to inseminate females, the early matured males are smaller but can be favored in some cases where courtship occurs on the ground and attain the highest reproductive success. Thus, in the fly Drosophila suboscura, smaller males are better than large males at tracking females during the courtship dance.

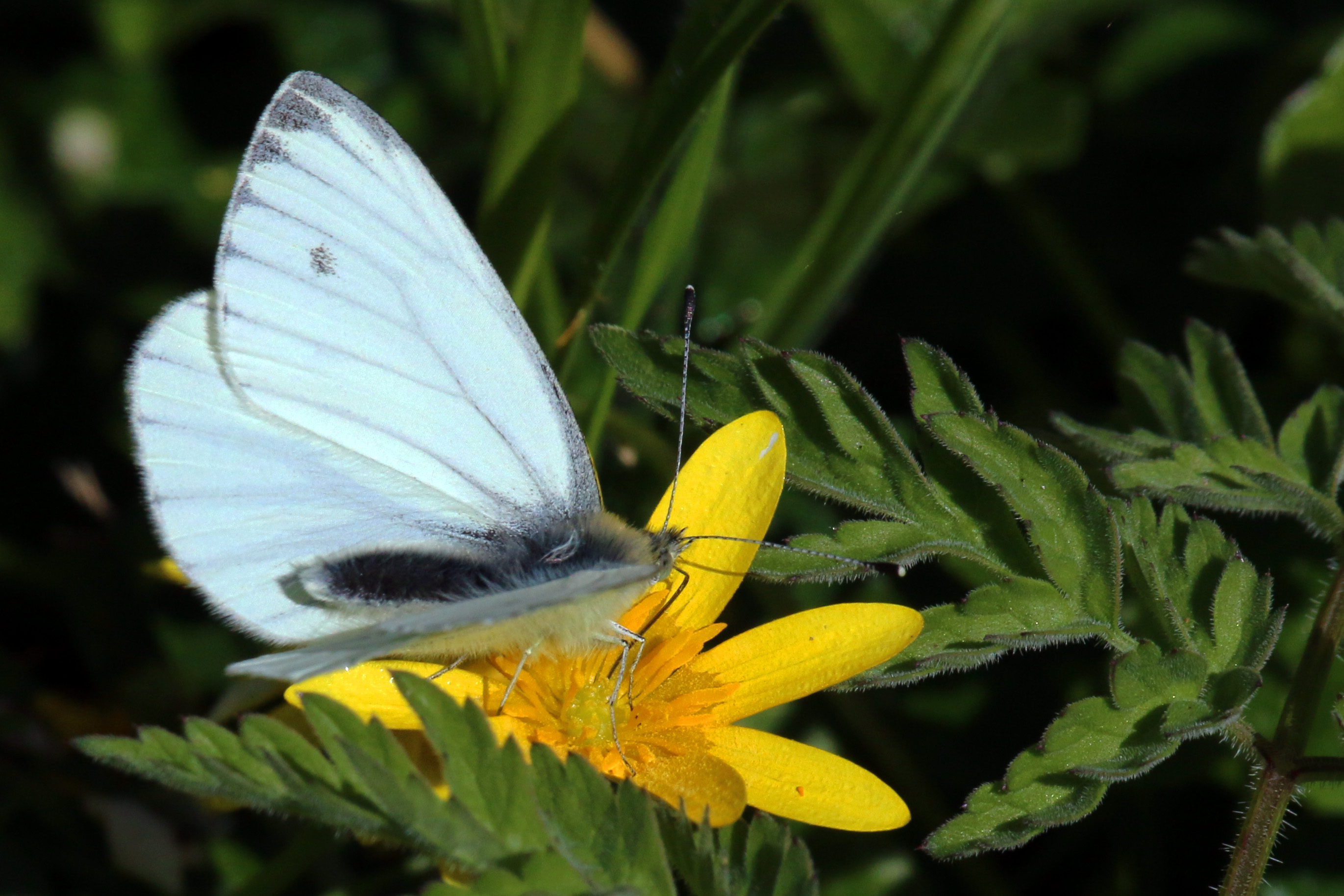
Green-veined white butterfly

Mantis

The effect of mating on female fitness may vary depending upon the kind of benefit that the females receive from males through of their choices. Direct benefits include nutritional resources to be used by females, donation of foods to mates, males offering prey to the female, seen in scorpion flies and dance flies. Several orthopteran species, butterflies, flies, and beetle males can donate secretions or nutritional substances to the females which are transferred in the ejaculate or produced by male glands which can contribute to increase female fecundity. In the green-veined white (Pieris napi), a virgin male can transfer an ejaculate containing 14% nitrogen by dry mass. Females utilize the nutrients transferred from the male in order to increase their nutrients. These nutrients essentially contribute to ensure successful egg production. A positive relationship between the amount of ejaculate material received and lifetime reproductive output, as male-transferred material increases female longevity. In some insect species, males can donate some body parts to females such as the leg spurs or the fleshy hindwings of jumped-winged crickets, or they may be completely cannibalized, as occurs in mantis and some dipterous, as well as in some Arachnida scorpions and spider species.

== Sexual pheromones ==
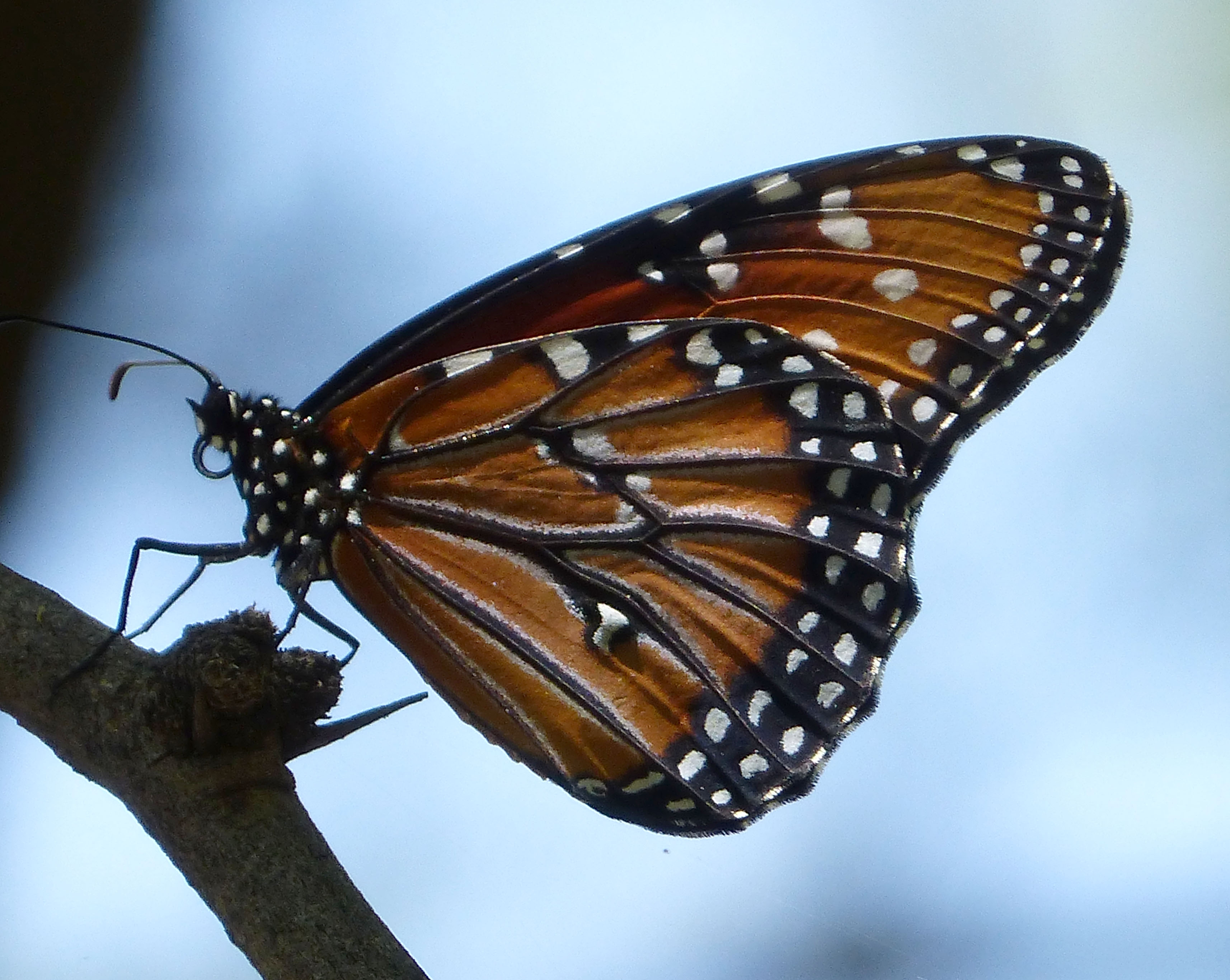
Queen butterfly

Sexual pheromones are defined as odors and are one of the prevalent ways in which social male insects find females to mate with. They can be produced in either males or females. The central roles of pheromones are to trigger behavioral interactions between the two sexes. Ultimately, this brings the sexes together for mating purposes. In addition, females discriminate against mates by the judgment of their sex pheromones. Courtship pheromones are issued in many cases by males. In the queen butterfly Danaus gilippus and the Arctic moth Utetheisa ornatrix, the chemical stimulation of the female is necessary for male mating success.

Mating in the Florida Queen (butterfly) Danaus gilippus is mediated by an alkaloid derived courting pheromone, danaidone, that a male can dust on the female. This mediates acceptance of the male by the female. Danaidone is a toxic alkaloid that the female incorporates into eggs as protection against predation.

Females of the Japanese scorpionfly, Panorpa japonica prefer the pheromone of males with low fluctuating asymmetry of the forewing. Low fluctuating asymmetry frequently correlates with individual fitness components such as growth, fecundity or survival. Thus female choice of mate should produce more fit offspring than random mating.

== Acoustic and visual signals ==
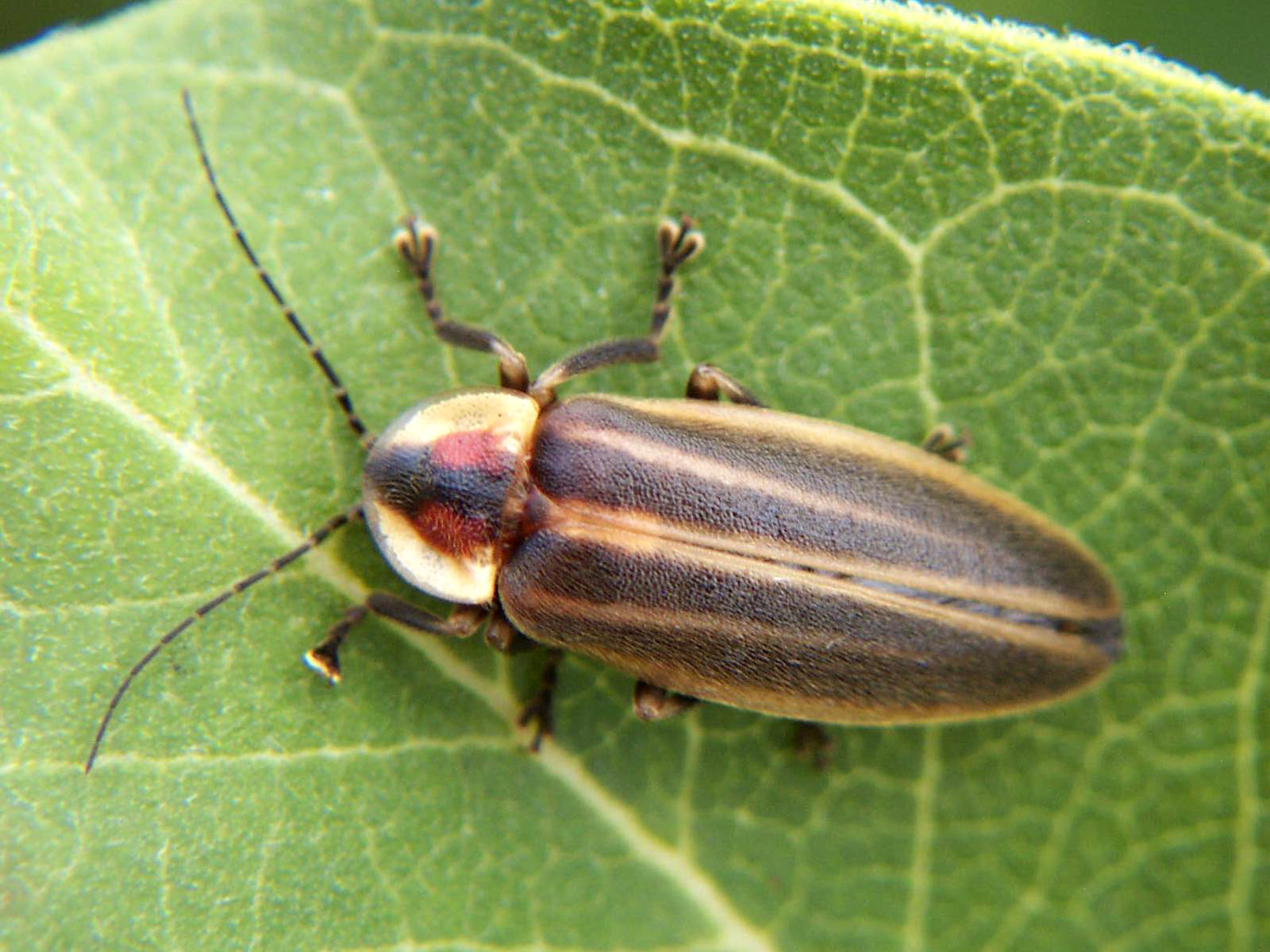
Firefly

In species such as the Coleopteran family Lampyridae, the males fly in the darkness and emit a species-specific pattern of light flashes, which are answered by perching receptive females. The color and temporal variation of the flash contribute to the success in attracting females. Acoustic signals are produced by many groups including several orthopteran species, neuropterida, cicadas, flies, cave planthroppers, leaf hoppers, and tree hoppers. In crickets and other Orthopeterans, loudness and/or uninterrupted songs often attract more females. In other insects, females may choose a mate in relation to aspects of his songs. In any case, it is possible that females compare the songs of several males before making a choice.

Female calling syndrome occurs when female social insects emit a typical call to the males in close proximity to their natal nests. Males that are attracted by the callings fly extensively in pursuit of potential mates. Their gasters raise and stings start to protrude. The venom glands are a basis of a chemical male attractant. In Xenomyrmex floridanus, the queen's venom glands and gasters both attracted males and prompted copulation.

Female grasshoppers of the species Chorthippus biguttulus can integrate information from calling songs of males. An unattractive song subunit has greater impact than an attractive song subunit, consistent with theories of sexual selection since it helps females avoid potentially costly interaction with unsuitable mating partners, particularly if the song belongs to another species or indicates a low-quality male.

== Removal of deleterious mutations ==
Callosobruchus maculatus is a species of beetle, also known as the cowpea seed beetle. Recessive deleterious mutations of this beetle are generally directly selected against in males but not in females. Mutations with deleterious effects on population growth due to their effects on females can be indirectly selected against and efficiently purged by way of their male siblings.

Tribolium castaneum is a species of beetle also known as the red flour beetle. When experimental populations of the red flour beetle were subjected to strong sexual selection for multiple years they became resilient to extinction. Furthermore when such beetles were subjected to inbreeding, they maintained fitness for up to 20 generations. However experimental lineages derived form populations that had either no or weak sexual selection experienced rapid fitness decline under inbreeding, and all of these populations became extinct within 10 generations. It was concluded from these findings that sexual selection reduces mutational load, and by doing so improves population viability.
