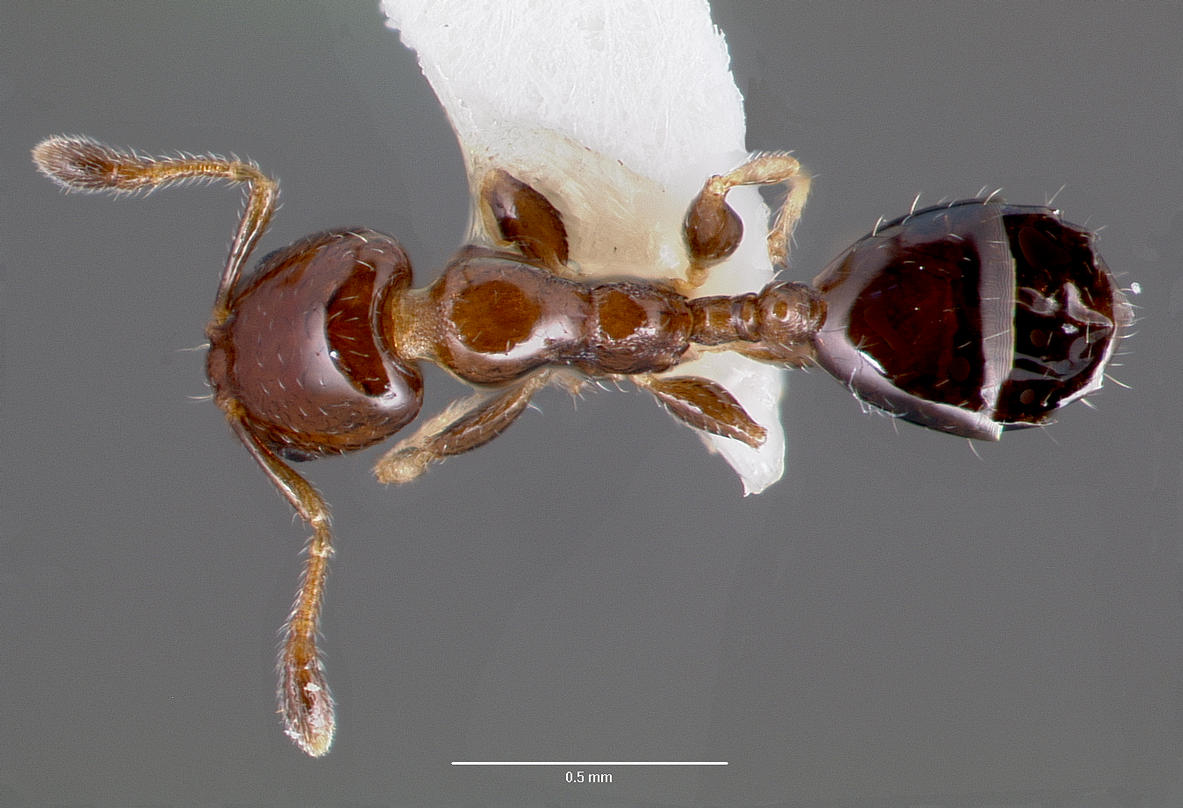

Scientific classification
- Kingdom: Animalia
- Phylum: Arthropoda
- Clade: Pancrustacea
- Class: Insecta
- Order: Hymenoptera
- Family: Formicidae
- Subfamily: Myrmicinae
- Genus: Xenomyrmex
- Species: X. floridanus

Binomial name
- Xenomyrmex floridanus Emery, 1895

Synonyms
- Xenomyrmex stollii floridanus Emery, 1895

= Xenomyrmex floridanus =

Species of ant

Xenomyrmex floridanus is a species of ant in the subfamily Myrmicinae.

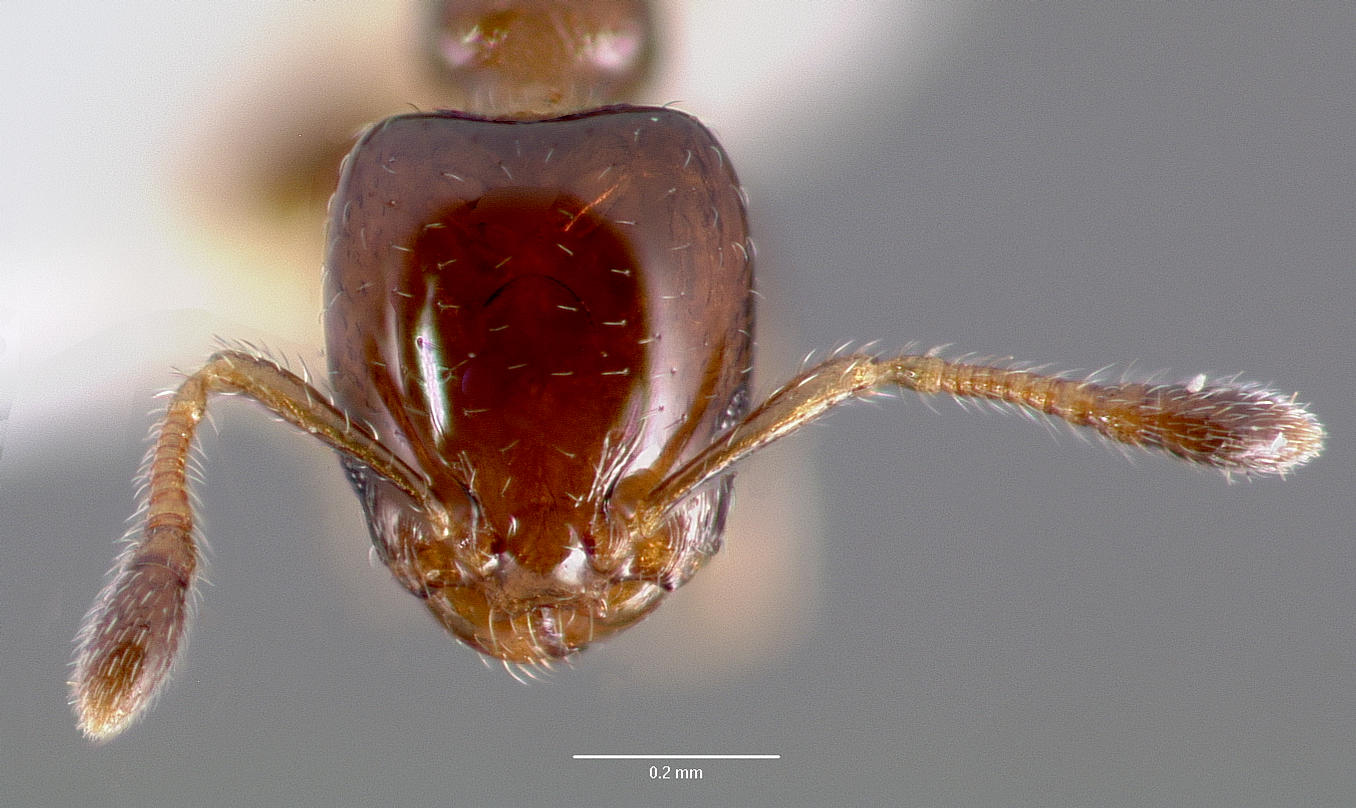

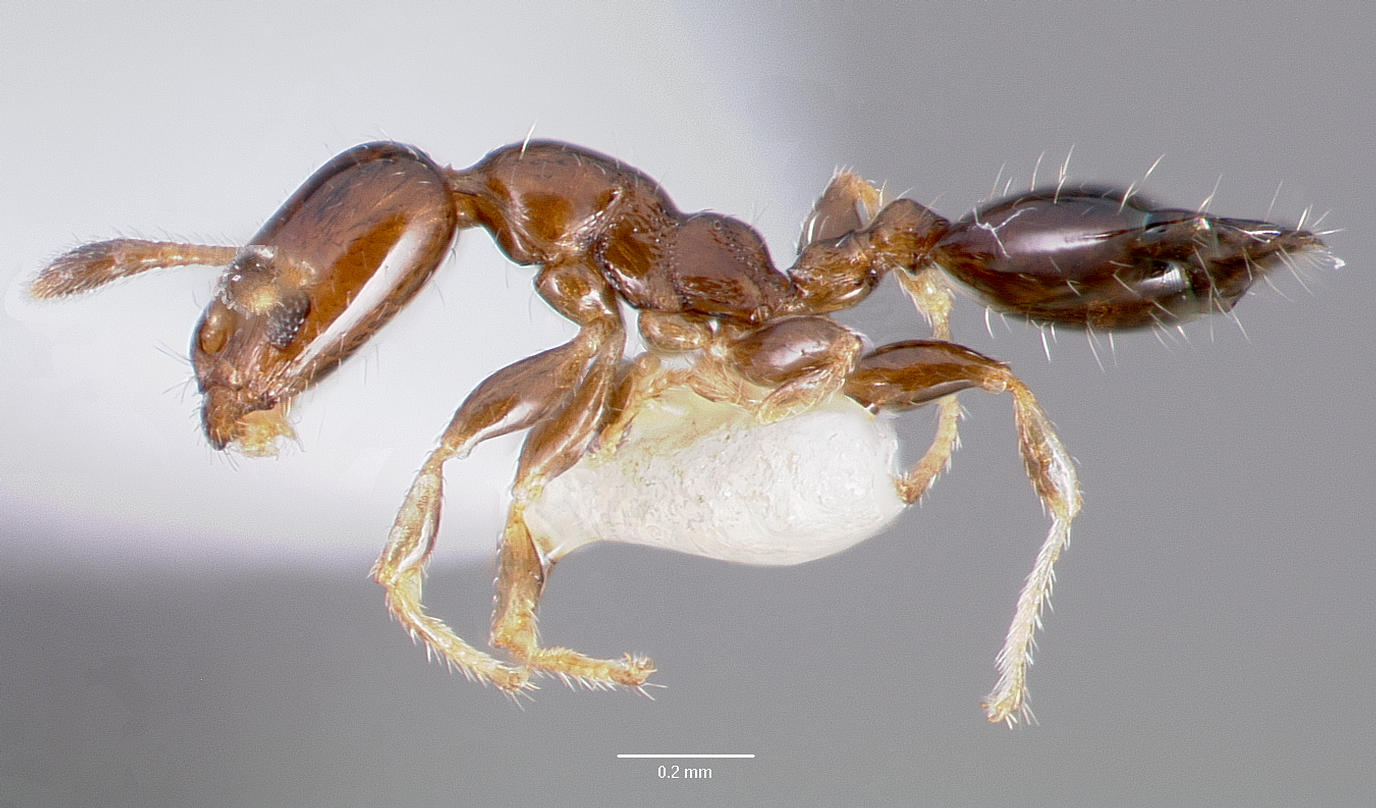

== Subspecies ==
These two subspecies belong to the species Xenomyrmex floridanus:

- Xenomyrmex floridanus floridanus Emery, 1895
- Xenomyrmex floridanus skwarrae Wheeler, 1931

== Distribution ==
It is found in the Southeast United States (Florida), in the Caribbean (Cuba, the Bahamas, Jamaica), and in Mexico and Guatemala.
