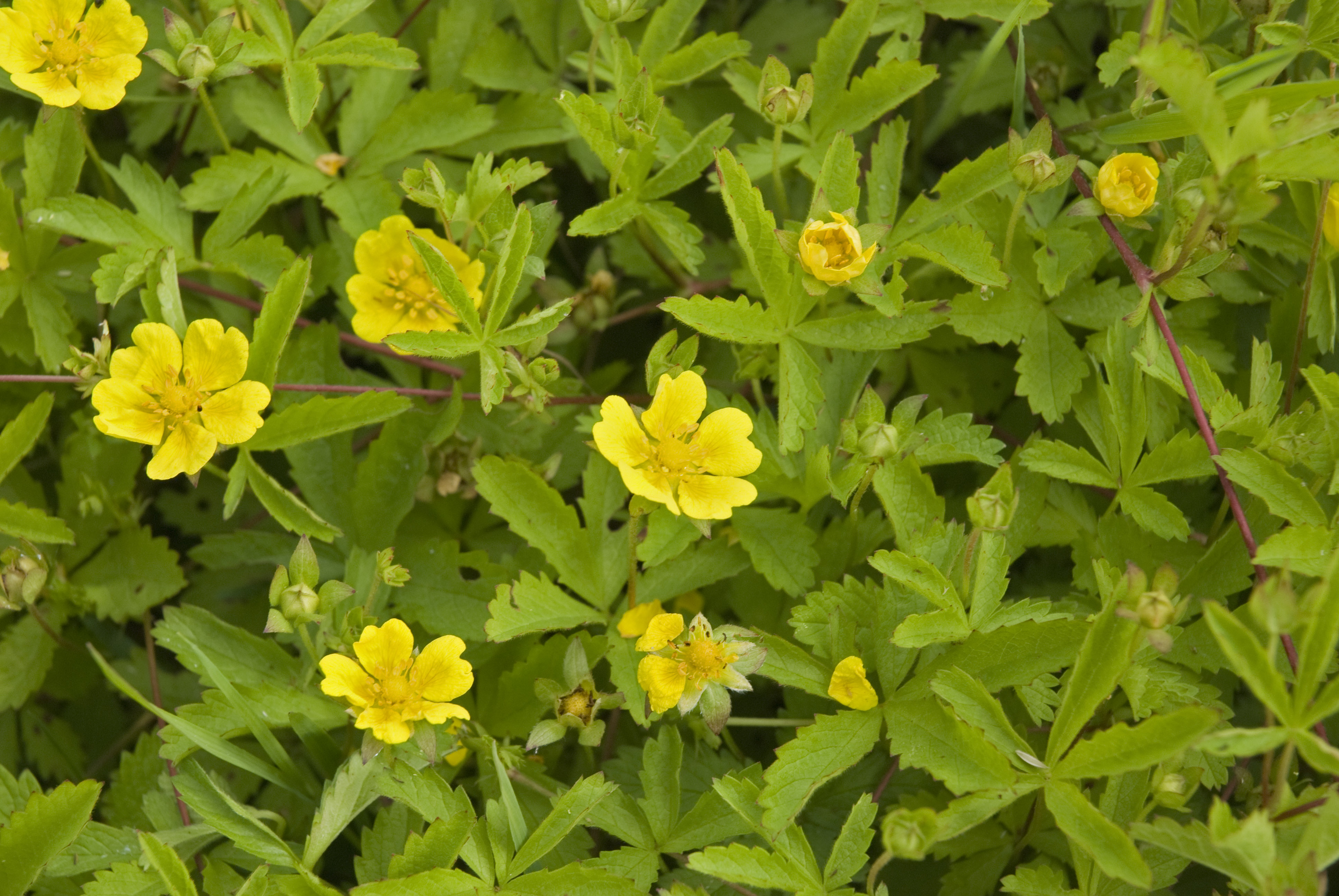

Scientific classification
- Kingdom: Plantae
- Clade: Embryophytes
- Clade: Tracheophytes
- Clade: Angiosperms
- Clade: Eudicots
- Clade: Rosids
- Order: Rosales
- Family: Rosaceae
- Genus: Potentilla
- Species: P. reptans

Binomial name
- Potentilla reptans L.

= Potentilla reptans =

Species of flowering plant in the rose family

Potentilla reptans, known as the creeping cinquefoil, European cinquefoil or creeping tormentil, is a flowering plant in the family Rosaceae.

== Description ==
A creeping perennial plant which can reach heights of up to 20 cm (7.9 in). Its trailing stems can root at the nodes, which allows the species to reproduce via vegetative reproduction. The palmate leaves are hairless, attached to long stalks and are divided into 5 to 7 leaflets, with small green leaf-like stipules at the base. The plant blooms between June and September in Europe with flowers that are about 7 mm to 11 mm in diameter with heart-shaped yellow petals. Long stalks support these solitary yellow flowers consisting of 5 petals and sepals with a large number of stamens and carpels at the centre. There are also 5 epicalyx segments, giving the appearance of 10 sepals.

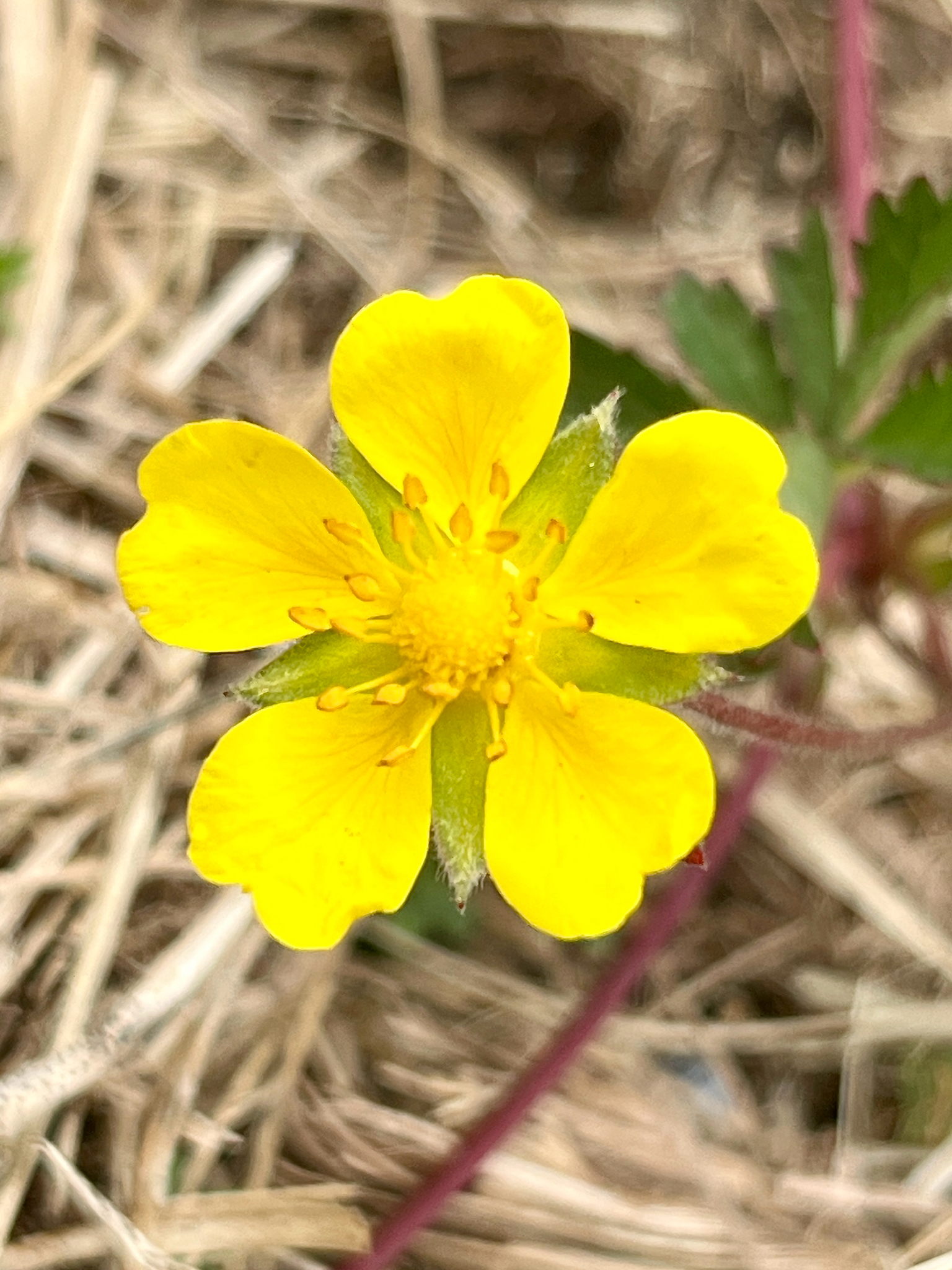
Flower of Potentilla reptans, Wales, UK

== Distribution ==
=== Native Range ===
Potentilla reptans has a large native distribution across the continents of Europe, Asia, and Africa. In Europe it is native throughout the continent, except Norway where it is introduced. In Asia it can be found in: Afghanistan, China, Cyprus, Mongolia, Iran, Iraq, Kazakhstan, Kirgizstan, Lebanon, Syria, Pakistan, Israel, Palestine, Tajikistan, Turkmenistan and Uzbekistan. In Africa it can be found in the countries of: Algeria, Eritrea, Ethiopia, Libya, Morocco and Tunisia.

=== Introduced Range ===
P. reptans has been introduced outside its native range into various countries across the globe. The species has been widely distributed across North America, where it can be found in the states and territories of: Bermuda, California, Colorado, Florida, Georgia, Illinois, Kentucky, Louisiana, Maryland, Massachusetts, Michigan, Minnesota, New Jersey, New York, Ohio, Oregon, Pennsylvania, Virginia, Washington and Wisconsin. It has also been introduced in Canada in the provinces of Ontario, Québec and Nova Scotia. In Oceania the species was also introduced into the countries of Australia and New Zealand.

== Habitat and ecology ==
P. reptans grows in neutral soils, where it utilizes both natural and manmade habitats such as grasslands, hedgerows, roadsides and arable land. The species can also grow in grass lawns and flowerbeds as an unwanted weed. The grizzled skipper butterfly (Pyrgus malvae) utilizes P. reptans as a foodplant for its caterpillars.

== Medicinal uses ==
Alcoholic extracts from roots of P. reptans showed a moderate antimicrobial activity against common wound pathogens.
