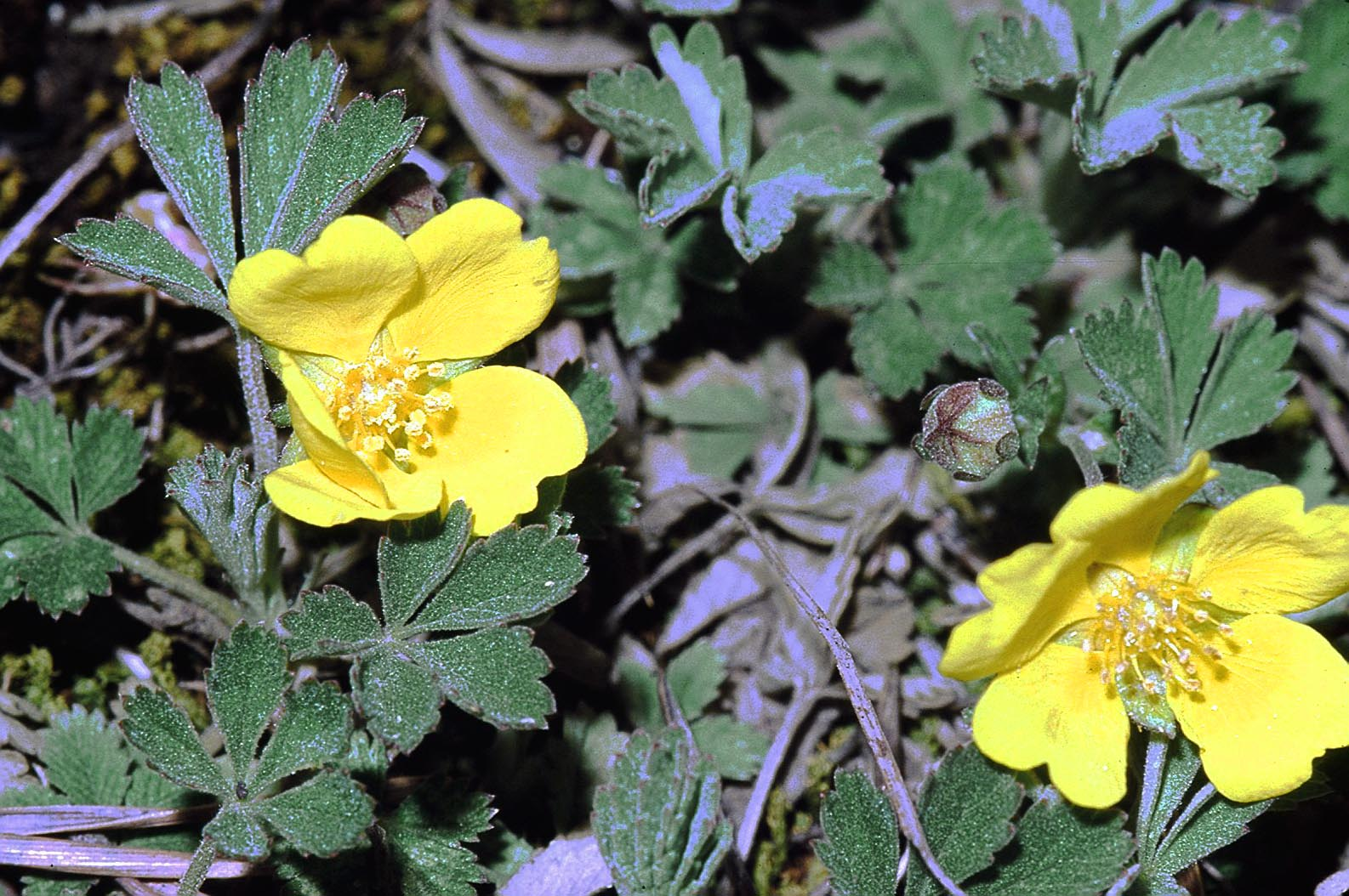
- Potentilla arenaria

Scientific classification
- Kingdom: Plantae
- Clade: Tracheophytes
- Clade: Angiosperms
- Clade: Eudicots
- Clade: Rosids
- Order: Rosales
- Family: Rosaceae
- Genus: Potentilla
- Species: P. incana

Binomial name
- Potentilla incana P.Gaertn., B.Mey. & Scherb.

Synonyms
- Potentilla acaulis subsp. arenaria (Borkh.) Soják; Potentilla arenaria Borkh. ex P.Gaertn., B.Mey. & Scherb.; Potentilla maculata Gilib.; Potentilla stellulata Rochel

= Potentilla incana =

Species of plant

Potentilla incana is a plant species in the genus Potentilla. It is native to Europe, with a range stretching from France to Russia.

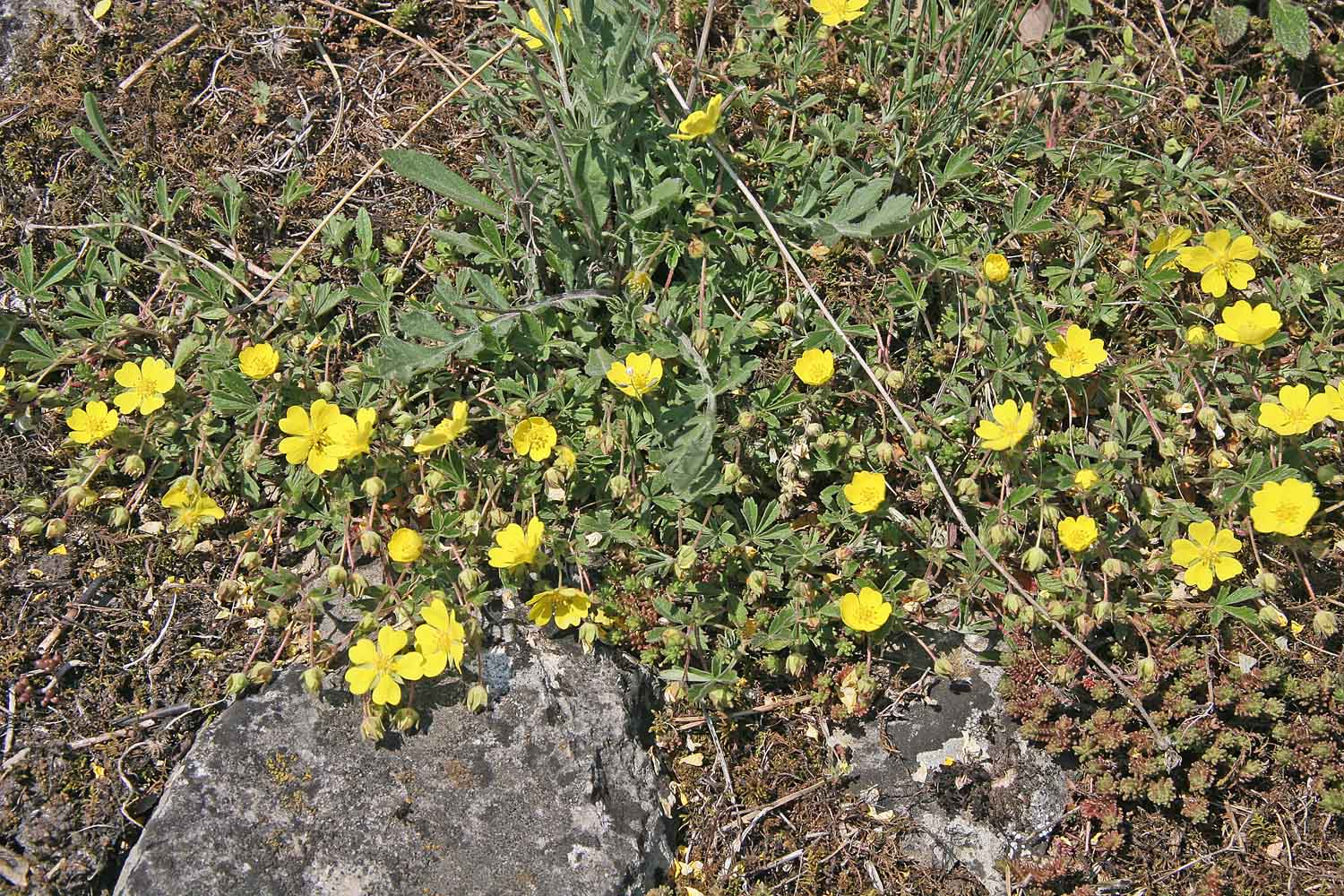
