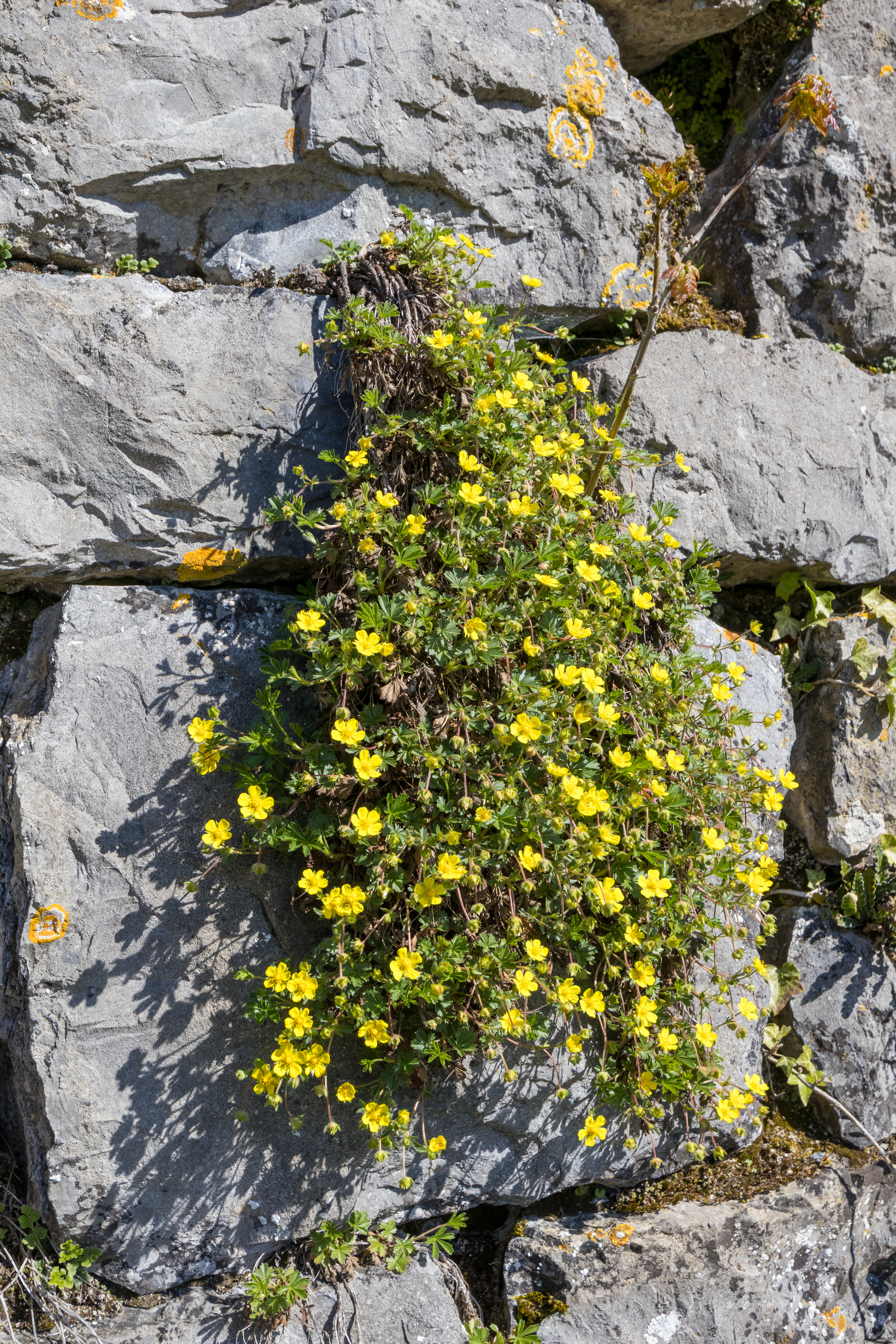

Scientific classification
- Kingdom: Plantae
- Clade: Embryophytes
- Clade: Tracheophytes
- Clade: Angiosperms
- Clade: Eudicots
- Clade: Rosids
- Order: Rosales
- Family: Rosaceae
- Genus: Potentilla
- Species: P. pusilla

Binomial name
- Potentilla pusilla Host

Synonyms
- List: Potentilla acaulis subsp. pusilla (Host) Guin.; Potentilla tabernaemontani subvar. pusilla (Host) Th.Wolf; Potentilla verna f. pusilla (Host) Th.Wolf; Potentilla verna var. pusilla (Host) W.D.J.Koch; Potentilla abbreviata Zimmeter; Potentilla albertii Zimmeter in; Potentilla bolzanensis var. astelligera F.Saut.; Potentilla bolzanensis var. latifolia F.Saut.; Potentilla bolzanensis var. prorepens F.Saut.; Potentilla bolzanensis var. umbrosa F.Saut.; Potentilla bondonis Evers; Potentilla bruginoensis Evers; Potentilla cinerea Gaudin; Potentilla cinerea subsp. gaudinii (Gremli) P.Fourn.; Potentilla cinerea var. gaudinii (Gremli) Rouy & E.G.Camus; Potentilla dubiosa Evers; Potentilla gaudinii Gremli; Potentilla gaudinii subvar. abbreviata (Zimmeter) Th.Wolf; Potentilla gaudinii subvar. aprica (Huter ex Th.Wolf) Th.Wolf; Potentilla gaudinii f. astelligera (F.Saut.) Th.Wolf; Potentilla gaudinii f. benacensis Zimmeter ex Th.Wolf; Potentilla gaudinii var. benacensis (Zimmeter ex Th.Wolf) Th.Wolf; Potentilla gaudinii var. boosiana (K.Malý) K.Malý; Potentilla gaudinii f. boosiana (K.Malý) K.Malý; Potentilla gaudinii f. eglandulosa Th.Wolf; Potentilla gaudinii f. eglandulosa Th.Wolf; Potentilla gaudinii subvar. eglandulosa (Th.Wolf) Th.Wolf; Potentilla gaudinii f. genuina Posp.; Potentilla gaudinii var. germadensis Posp.; Potentilla gaudinii f. glandulosa Th.Wolf; Potentilla gaudinii subvar. glandulosissima Th.Wolf; Potentilla gaudinii f. glandulosissima (Th.Wolf) Th.Wolf; Potentilla gaudinii f. grandiflora Th.Wolf; Potentilla gaudinii subvar. grandiflora (Th.Wolf) Th.Wolf; Potentilla gaudinii var. grisancensis Beyer; Potentilla gaudinii f. haematosticta (Goiran) Th.Wolf; Potentilla gaudinii f. incisa Posp.; Potentilla gaudinii f. latifolia (F.Saut.) Th.Wolf; Potentilla gaudinii proles longifolia (Th.Wolf) Th.Wolf; Potentilla gaudinii var. longifolia Th.Wolf; Potentilla gaudinii f. murriana Th.Wolf; Potentilla gaudinii subvar. murrii (Zimmeter) Th.Wolf; Potentilla gaudinii f. nana Th.Wolf; Potentilla gaudinii f. parceglandulosa Th.Wolf; Potentilla gaudinii f. parviflora Th.Wolf; Potentilla gaudinii subvar. parviflora (Th.Wolf) Th.Wolf; Potentilla gaudinii f. pilosior Th.Wolf; Potentilla gaudinii f. platypetala Th.Wolf; Potentilla gaudinii f. prorepens (F.Saut.) Th.Wolf; Potentilla gaudinii proles sarajevensis (K.Malý) K.Malý; Potentilla gaudinii f. stenopetala Th.Wolf; Potentilla gaudinii subvar. stenopetala (Th.Wolf) Th.Wolf; Potentilla gaudinii var. tirolensis (Zimmeter) Schinz & R.Keller; Potentilla gaudinii proles typica Th.Wolf; Potentilla gaudinii var. typica Posp.; Potentilla gaudinii f. umbrosa (F.Saut.) Th.Wolf; Potentilla gaudinii var. virescens Th.Wolf; Potentilla gaudinii proles virescens (Th.Wolf) Th.Wolf; Potentilla gelmiana Siegfr. ex Th.Wolf; Potentilla germadensis Evers ex Th.Wolf; Potentilla ginsiensis Woł. ex T.Durand & B.D.Jacks.; Potentilla ginsiensis Waisb.; Potentilla glandulifera Krašan ex A.Kern.; Potentilla glandulifera subsp. gaudinii (Gremli) Hayek; Potentilla glandulifera var. lancifolia (Waisb.) Hayek; Potentilla glandulifera var. longifolia (Borbás ex Zimmeter) Hayek; Potentilla glandulifera f. tiroliensis Hayek; Potentilla glandulifera var. virescens (Th.Wolf) Gajić; Potentilla glandulifera subsp. virescens (Th.Wolf) Hayek; Potentilla glandulifera var. viscidula Waisb.; Potentilla glandulosa Krašan; Potentilla haematosticta Goiran; Potentilla incana var. gaudinii (Gremli) Burnat & Briq.; Potentilla lancifolia Waisb.; Potentilla longifolia Borbás ex Zimmeter; Potentilla longifrons Borbás; Potentilla loppiensis Evers; Potentilla mezzocoronae Evers; Potentilla monticola Zimmeter; Potentilla murrii Zimmeter; Potentilla neumanniana Rchb.; Potentilla noarnae Evers; Potentilla oenipontana Murr ex Th.Wolf; Potentilla opaca f. longifrons (Borbás) Beck; Potentilla opaca neumanniana (Rchb.) Wünsche; Potentilla opaca var. neumanniana (Rchb.) Nyman; Potentilla opaca f. pusilla Vocke ex Zimmeter; Potentilla opaca var. vindobonensis (Zimmeter) Beck; Potentilla pari Evers; Potentilla ponale Evers; Potentilla puberula Krašan; Potentilla puberula var. viridis (Neilr.) Bech.; Potentilla pusilla var. lancifolia (Waisb.) Soó; Potentilla pusilla var. longifolia (Borbás ex Zimmeter) J.C.Mayer ex Soó; Potentilla pusilla var. viridis (Neilr.) J.C.Mayer ex Soó; Potentilla rivae Evers; Potentilla ronchii Evers; Potentilla rubens var. pusilla (Vocke ex Zimmeter) Th.Wolf; Potentilla tabernaemontani var. boosiana K.Malý; Potentilla tabernaemontani longifrons (Borbás) A.F.Schwarz; Potentilla tabernaemontani proles neumanniana (Rchb.) Th.Wolf; Potentilla tabernaemontani f. sarajevensis K.Malý; Potentilla tiroliensis Zimmeter; Potentilla tiroliensis f. aprica Huter ex Th.Wolf; Potentilla vasonis Evers; Potentilla verna var. astelligera (F.Saut.) Reiter; Potentilla verna var. gaudinii (Gremli) Fiori; Potentilla verna f. glandulifera (Krašan ex A.Kern.) Bolzon; Potentilla verna var. longifolia Borbás ex Zimmeter; Potentilla verna subsp. longifrons (Borbás) Focke; Potentilla verna var. neumanniana (Rchb.) Th.Wolf; Potentilla verna subsp. puberula (Krašan) Hegi; Potentilla verna var. viridis Neilr.; Potentilla vindobonensis Zimmeter; Potentilla viridis (Neilr.) Fritsch; Potentilla viscida Evers

= Potentilla pusilla =

Species of flowering plant in the rose family

Potentilla pusilla, the spring cinquefoil or spotted cinquefoil, is a perennial species of flowering plant in the rose family (Rosaceae). It may grow up to the height of 5–15 cm (2–6 in).

It was first scientifically described by H.G.L. Reichenbach in 1832. P.F.A. Ascherson later called it P. tabernaemontani, a name which is now invalid. The name P. verna was misapplied to this species; as originally described by Linnaeus, it actually refers to the alpine cinquefoil (P. crantzii). This is a fairly undistinguished species of cinquefoil. Its typical five-fingered leaves and—in early spring—five-petalled yellow flowers are borne on low-lying stems. As its common name implies, in most of its range, it is one of the first cinquefoils to bloom. It can grow in dry, marginal habitats, such as roadsides, meadows, and talus. Thus it can be used for rock gardens, providing bright bunches of yellow when few other plants are blooming.
