= County flowers of the United Kingdom =

Unofficial 2002 public survey

In 2002 Plantlife conducted a "County Flowers" public survey to assign flowers to each of the counties of the United Kingdom and the Isle of Man. The results of this campaign designated a single plant species to a "county or metropolitan area" in the UK and Isle of Man. Some English counties already had flowers traditionally associated with them before 2002, and which were different from those assigned to them by Plantlife, including the white rose for Yorkshire (assigned the harebell), the poppy for Norfolk (assigned the Alexanders), and the cowslip for Essex (assigned the poppy). Some flowers were assigned to multiple counties.

== England ==
County	Image	Common name	Scientific name	County status	Shared
Bedfordshire	Bee orchid	bee orchid	Ophrys apifera	native	
Berkshire	Summer snowflake	summer snowflake	Leucojum aestivum	native	
Bristol	Maltese-cross	Maltese-cross	Silene chalcedonica	casual	
Buckinghamshire	Chiltern gentian	Chiltern gentian	Gentianella germanica	native	
Cambridgeshire	Pasqueflower	pasqueflower	Pulsatilla vulgaris	native	Hertfordshire
Cheshire	Cuckooflower	cuckooflower	Cardamine pratensis	native	Brecknockshire
Cornwall	Cornish heath	Cornish heath	Erica vagans	native	
County Durham	Spring gentian	spring gentian	Gentiana verna	native	
Cumberland	Grass-of-Parnassus	grass-of-Parnassus	Parnassia palustris	native	Sutherland
Derbyshire		Jacob's-ladder	Polemonium caeruleum	native	
Devon	Primrose	primrose	Primula vulgaris	native	
Dorset	Dorset heath	Dorset heath	Erica ciliaris	native	
Essex	Common poppy	common poppy	Papaver rhoeas	native	Norfolk
Gloucestershire	Wild daffodil	wild daffodil	Narcissus pseudonarcissus	native	
Greater Manchester	Common cotton-grass	common cotton-grass	Eriophorum angustifolium	native	
Hampshire	Dog-rose	dog-rose	Rosa canina	native	
Herefordshire	Mistletoe	mistletoe	Viscum album	native	
Hertfordshire	Pasqueflower	pasqueflower	Pulsatilla vulgaris	native	Cambridgeshire
Huntingdonshire	Water-violet	water-violet	Hottonia palustris	native	
Isle of Wight	Pyramidal orchid	pyramidal orchid	Anacamptis pyramidalis	native	
Isles of Scilly	Thrift	thrift	Armeria maritima	native	Bute & Pembrokeshire
Kent	Hop	hop	Humulus lupulus	native	
Lancashire	Red rose	red rose	Rosa gallica officinalis	absent	
Leeds	Bilberry	bilberry	Vaccinium myrtillus	native	
Leicestershire	Foxglove	foxglove	Digitalis purpurea	native	Argyll, Monmouthshire & West Midlands
Lincolnshire	Viola riviniana	common dog-violet	Viola riviniana	native	
London	Rosebay willowherb	rosebay willowherb	Epilobium angustifolium	native	
Merseyside	Sea-holly	sea-holly	Eryngium maritimum	native	
Middlesex	Wood anemone	wood anemone	Anemone nemorosa	native	
Norfolk	Common poppy	common poppy (Note: Initially, Alexanders was selected for Norfolk, with poppy selected for Essex alone. Public pressure led to change,)	Papaver rhoeas	native	Essex
Northamptonshire	Cowslip	cowslip	Primula veris	native	Surrey & Worcestershire
Northumberland	Bloody crane's-bill	bloody crane's-bill	Geranium sanguineum	native	
Nottingham	Nottingham catchfly	Nottingham catchfly	Silene nutans	native	
Nottinghamshire	Autumn crocus	autumn crocus	Crocus nudiflorus	archaeophyte	
Oxfordshire	Snake's-head fritillary	snake's-head fritillary	Fritillaria meleagris	native	
Rutland	Clustered bellflower	clustered bellflower	Campanula glomerata	native	
Sheffield	Wood crane's-bill	wood crane's-bill	Geranium sylvaticum	native	
Shropshire	Round-leaved sundew	round-leaved sundew	Drosera rotundifolia	native	
Somerset	Cheddar pink	Cheddar pink	Dianthus gratianopolitanus	native	
Staffordshire	Heather	heather	Calluna vulgaris	native	
Suffolk	Oxlip	oxlip	Primula elatior	native	
Surrey	Cowslip	cowslip	Primula veris	native	Northamptonshire & Worcestershire
Sussex	Round-headed rampion	round-headed rampion	Phyteuma orbiculare	native	
Tyne and Wear	Monkeyflower	monkeyflower	Mimulus guttatus	neophyte	
Warwickshire	Honeysuckle	honeysuckle	Lonicera periclymenum	native	
West Midlands	Foxglove	foxglove	Digitalis purpurea	native	Argyll, Leicestershire & Monmouthshire
Westmorland	Alpine Forget-me-Not	alpine forget-me-not	Myosotis alpestris	native	
Wiltshire	Burnt-tip orchid	burnt-tip orchid	Neotinea ustulata	native	
Worcestershire	Cowslip	cowslip	Primula veris	native	Northamptonshire & Surrey
Yorkshire	Harebell	harebell	Campanula rotundifolia	native	Antrim & Dumfriesshire

== Isle of Man ==
County	Image	Common name	Scientific name	County status	Shared
Isle of Man (Note: The Isle of Man has a traditional national flower (it is not a county), the "Cushag" or ragwort.)	Fuchsia magellanica	fuchsia	Fuchsia magellanica	neophyte	

== Northern Ireland ==
County	Image	Common name	Scientific name	County status	Shared
Antrim	Harebell	harebell	Campanula rotundifolia	native	Dumfriesshire & Yorkshire
Armagh	Cowbane	cowbane	Cicuta virosa	native	
Belfast	Gorse	gorse	Ulex europaeus	native	
Derry	Purple saxifrage	purple saxifrage	Saxifraga oppositifolia	native	
Down	Spring squill	spring squill	Scilla verna	native	
Fermanagh	Globeflower	globeflower	Trollius europaeus	native	
Tyrone	Bog-rosemary	bog-rosemary	Andromeda polifolia	native	Ceredigion & Kirkcudbright

== Scotland ==
County	Image	Common name	Scientific name	County status	Shared
Aberdeenshire	Bearberry	bearberry	Arctostaphylos uva-ursi	native	
Angus	Alpine catchfly	Alpine catchfly	Silene suecica	native	
Argyll	Foxglove	foxglove	Digitalis purpurea	native	Leicestershire, Monmouthshire & West Midlands
Ayrshire	Green-winged orchid	green-winged orchid	Anacamptis morio	native	
Banffshire	Dark red helleborine	dark-red helleborine	Epipactis atrorubens	native	
Berwickshire	Common Rock-rose	rock-rose	Helianthemum nummularium	native	
Bute	Thrift	thrift	Armeria maritima	native	Isles of Scilly & Pembrokeshire
Caithness	Scottish primrose	Scottish primrose	Primula scotica	native	
Clackmannanshire	Opposite-leaved golden-saxifrage	opposite-leaved golden-saxifrage	Chrysosplenium oppositifolium	native	
Cromarty	Spring cinquefoil	spring cinquefoil	Potentilla neumanniana	native	
Dumfriesshire	Harebell	harebell	Campanula rotundifolia	native	Antrim & Yorkshire
Dunbartonshire	Lesser water-plantain	lesser water-plantain	Baldellia ranunculoides	native	
East Lothian	Viper's-bugloss	viper's-bugloss	Echium vulgare	native	
Fife	Coralroot orchid	coralroot orchid	Corallorrhiza trifida	native	
Glasgow	Broom	broom	Cytisus scoparius	native	
Inverness-shire	Twinflower	twinflower	Linnaea borealis	native	
Kinross	Holy-grass	holy-grass	Hierochloe odorata	native	
Kirkcudbright	Bog-rosemary	bog-rosemary	Andromeda polifolia	native	Ceredigion & Tyrone
Lanarkshire	Dune helleborine	dune helleborine	Epipactis leptochila	native	
Midlothian	Sticky catchfly	sticky catchfly	Silene viscaria	native	
Moray	One-flowered wintergreen	one-flowered wintergreen	Moneses uniflora	native	
Nairn	Chickweed wintergreen	chickweed wintergreen	Trientalis europaea	native	
Orkney	Alpine bearberry	Alpine bearberry	Arctostaphylos alpina	native	
Peeblesshire	Cloudberry	cloudberry	Rubus chamaemorus	native	
Perthshire	Alpine gentian	Alpine gentian	Gentiana nivalis	native	
Renfrewshire	Bogbean	bogbean	Menyanthes trifoliata	native	
Ross	Bog asphodel	bog asphodel	Narthecium ossifragum	native	
Roxburghshire	Maiden pink	maiden pink	Dianthus deltoides	native	
Selkirkshire	Mountain pansy	mountain pansy	Viola lutea	native	
Shetland	Shetland mouse-ear	Shetland mouse-ear	Cerastium nigrescens	native	
Stirlingshire	Scottish dock	Scottish dock	Rumex aquaticus	native	
Sutherland	Grass-of-Parnassus	grass-of-Parnassus	Parnassia palustris	native	Cumbria
West Lothian	Common spotted-orchid	common spotted-orchid	Dactylorhiza fuchsii	native	
Western Isles	Hebridean spotted-orchid	Hebridean spotted-orchid	Dactylorhiza fuchsii subsp. hebridensis	native	
Wigtownshire	Yellow iris	yellow iris	Iris pseudacorus	native	

== Wales ==
County	Image	Common name	Scientific name	County status	Shared
Anglesey	Spotted rock-rose	spotted rock-rose	Tuberaria guttata	native	
Brecknockshire	Cuckooflower	cuckooflower	Cardamine pratensis	native	Cheshire
Caernarfonshire	Snowdon lily	Snowdon lily	Gagea serotina, syn. Lloydia serotina	native	
Cardiff	Wild leek	wild leek	Allium ampeloprasum	native	
Carmarthenshire	Whorled caraway	whorled caraway	Carum verticillatum	native	
Ceredigion	Bog-rosemary	bog-rosemary	Andromeda polifolia	native	Kirkcudbright & Tyrone
Denbighshire	Limestone woundwort	limestone woundwort	Stachys alpina	native	
Flintshire	Bell heather	bell heather	Erica cinerea	native	
Glamorgan	Draba aizoides	yellow whitlow-grass	Draba aizoides	native	
Merioneth	Welsh poppy	Welsh poppy	Papaver cambricum	native	
Monmouthshire	Foxglove	foxglove	Digitalis purpurea	native	Argyll, Leicestershire & West Midlands
Montgomeryshire	Spiked speedwell	spiked speedwell	Veronica spicata	native	
Pembrokeshire	Thrift	thrift	Armeria maritima	native	Bute & Isles of Scilly
Radnorshire	Radnor lily	Radnor lily	Gagea bohemica	native	
