= Barnsley Warren =

Biological Site of Special Scientific Interest in Gloucestershire, England

- Site of Special Scientific Interest
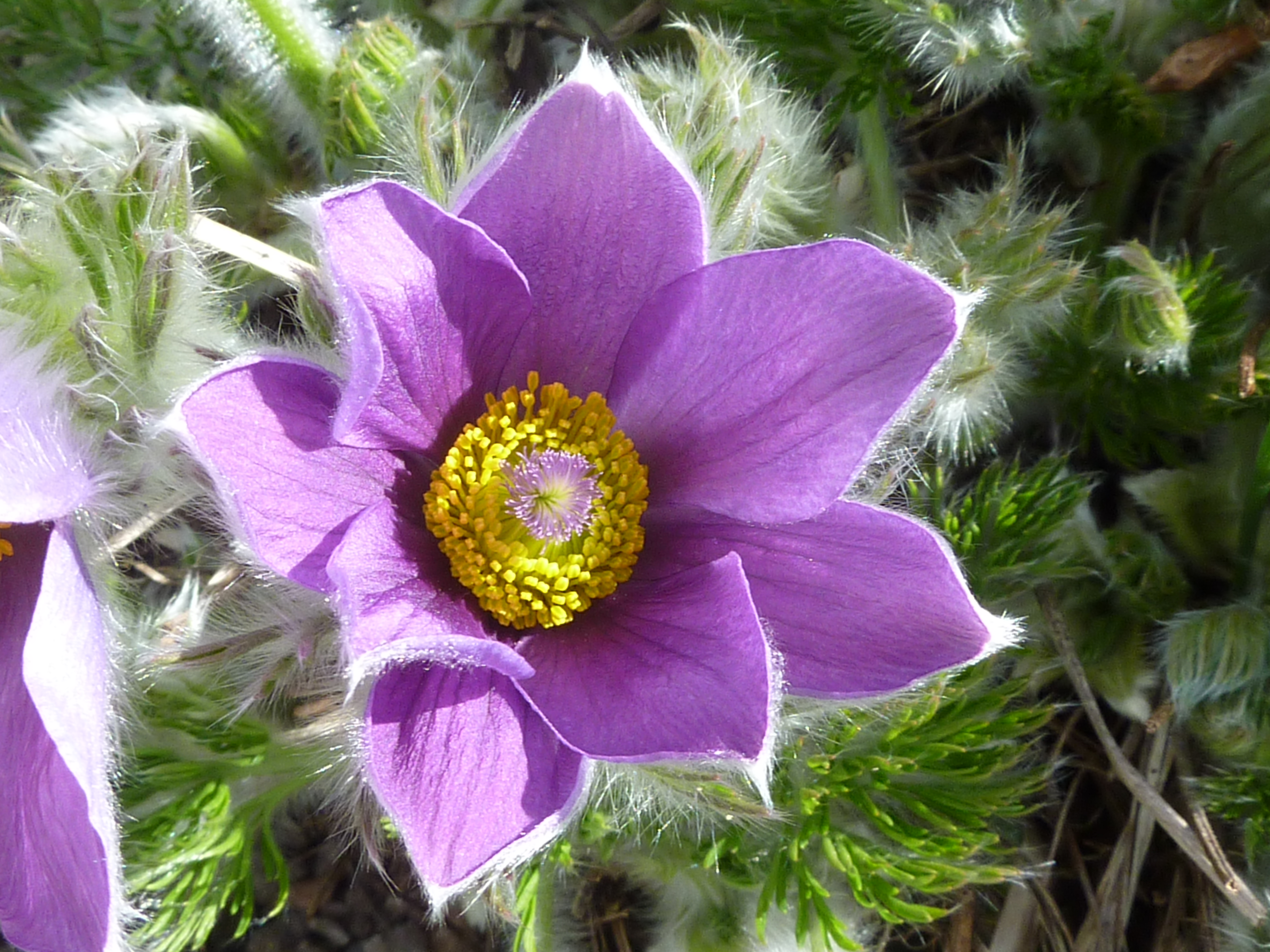
- Example - pasqueflower (Pulsatilla vulgaris)
- Location of Barnsley Warren.
- Area of search: Gloucestershire
- Grid reference: SP055064
- Coordinates: 51.7562°N 1.9217°W
- Interest: Biological
- Area: 61.3 ha (151 acres)
- Notification date: 1954

Barnsley Warren (grid reference SP055064) is a 61.3-hectare (151-acre) biological Site of Special Scientific Interest in Gloucestershire, notified in 1954 and renotified in 1984. The site is also included in A Nature Conservation Review. It lies in a steep-sided dry valley, east of the A429, northeast of Cirencester in the Cotswolds. The site is listed in the 'Cotswold District' Local Plan 2001-2011 (on line) as a Key Wildlife Site (KWS).

Following the introduction of the Countryside and Rights of Way Act, the whole of the site was designated "access land" and is therefore open to public access.

There are seven units of assessment and the Gloucestershire Pasqueflower Reserve is unit 4.

== Gloucestershire Pasqueflower Reserve ==
- Natural England SSSI information on Barnsley Warren

Within the boundary of the Warren, at grid reference SP052071, is the Gloucestershire Wildlife Trust's Gloucestershire Pasqueflower Reserve which is a 5.3-hectare (13-acre) site. Detailed information is published in the Gloucestershire Wildlife Trust nature reserves handbook.

Pasqueflower (Pulsatilla vulgaris) is found in larger quantities here than anywhere else in the Cotswolds, which are at the western limit of this species' European range. The flowers bloom in late April or early May. The population has been estimated at over twenty thousand plants.

This is a south-west facing slope of Oolitic limestone slope. The thin rendzina soils become richer colluvial deposits in the valley floor. There is a typical Cotswold winterwell in the south-east corner. When this floods in winter it becomes the source of the Ampney Brook.

== Other notable plants and species ==
The Gloucestershire Wildlife Trust reserves handbook lists species. Other notable plants found at the site include man orchid (Aceras anthropophorum), musk orchid (Herminimum monorchis), slender bedstraw (Galium pumilum), chalk milkwort (Polgala calcarea), round-headed rampion (Phyteuma tenerum) and bastard-toadflax (Thesium humifusum).

The diverse range of flowers and grasses is ideal for many downland insects and the reserve has particular good butterfly and bug populations. Recorded are small blue, chalkhill blue and dark green fritillary butterflies and the cydnid shield bug, Sehirus dubius, feeds on the bastard-toadflax. The heath snail, recorded for the site, is an indicator of ancient grassland.

== Conservation ==
The site is grazed to prevent the dominant growth of upright brome and tor-grass.

== Plant communities ==
The plant community in which the pasqueflower grows is CG5 (Bromus erectus - Brachypodium pinnatum grassland) in the British National Vegetation Classification

== SSSI source ==
- Natural England SSSI information on the citation
- Natural England SSSI information on the Barnsley Warren units
