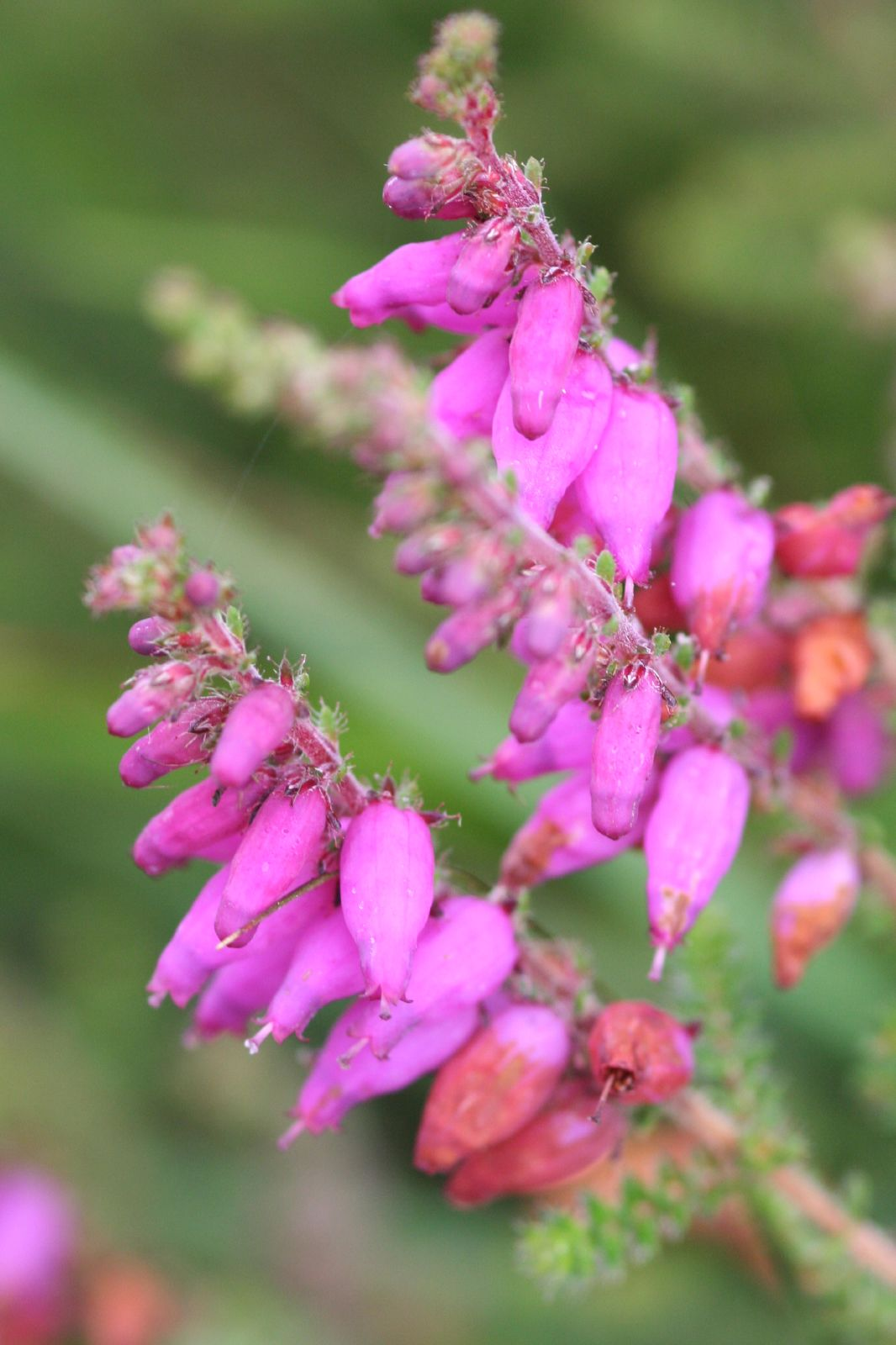

Scientific classification
- Kingdom: Plantae
- Clade: Tracheophytes
- Clade: Angiosperms
- Clade: Eudicots
- Clade: Asterids
- Order: Ericales
- Family: Ericaceae
- Genus: Erica
- Species: E. ciliaris

Binomial name
- Erica ciliaris L.

= Erica ciliaris =

Dorset heath

Species of flowering plant

Erica ciliaris, the dorset heath, is a species of flowering plant in the genus Erica.

== Description ==
It grows to 60 centimetres (24 inches), and has leaves 2–4 millimetres (1/16–3/16 in) long, with long, glandular hairs. The flowers are 8–12 mm (3/8–1/2 in) long, bright pink, and arranged in long racemes.

== Distribution and habitat ==
Erica ciliaris has a Lusitanian distribution, stretching from Morocco in the south, along the Atlantic coasts of Portugal, Spain and France to south-western parts of the British Isles in the north. In the British Isles, it is only found natively in Dorset, Devon, Cornwall and one location in County Galway, where it lives in bogs and wet heaths. It has also been introduced to Hampshire.

== In culture ==
E. ciliaris was voted the county flower of Dorset in 2002 following a poll by the wild flora conservation charity Plantlife.
