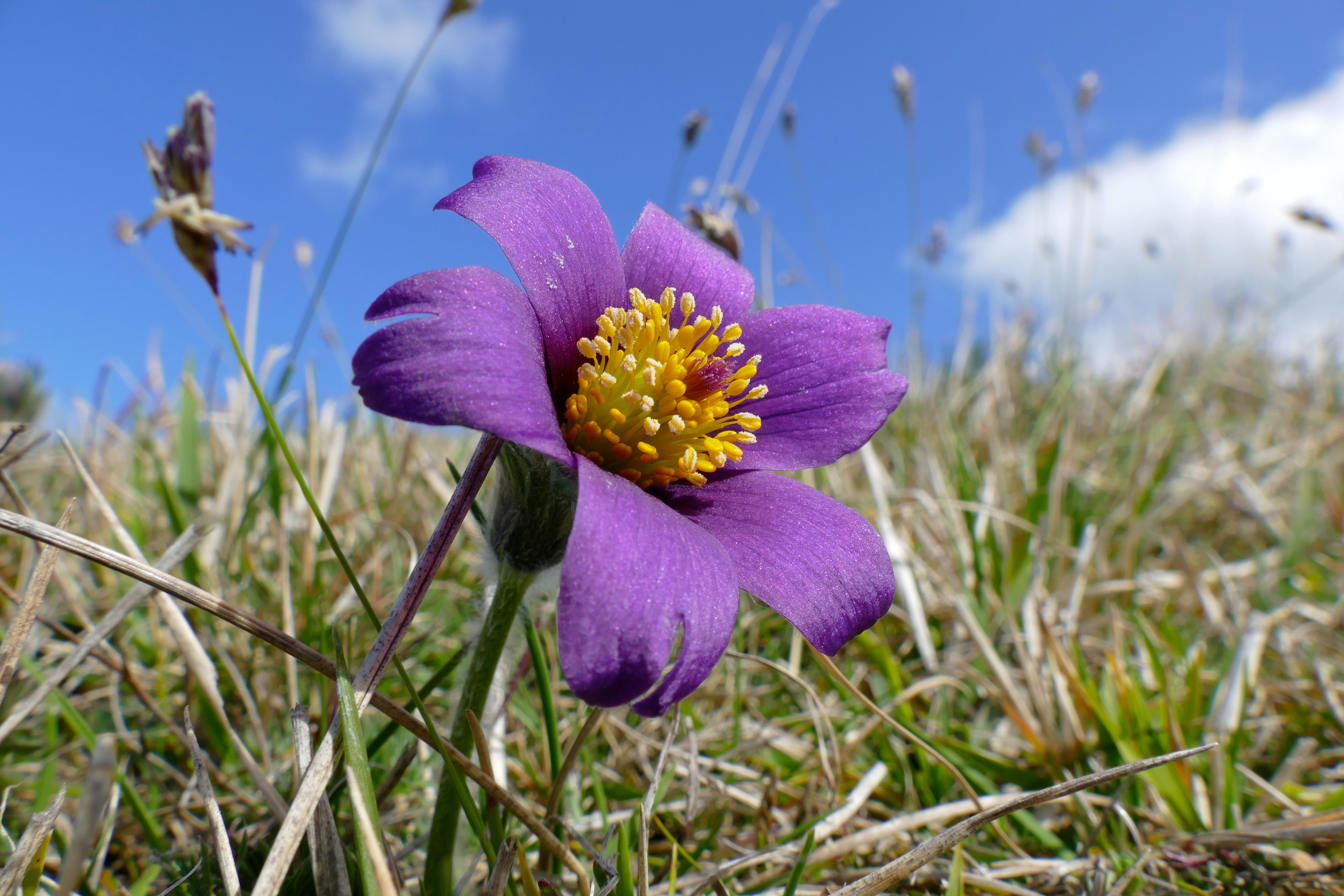

Conservation status
- Near Threatened (IUCN 3.1)

Scientific classification
- Kingdom: Plantae
- Clade: Tracheophytes
- Clade: Angiosperms
- Clade: Eudicots
- Order: Ranunculales
- Family: Ranunculaceae
- Genus: Pulsatilla
- Species: P. vulgaris

Binomial name
- Pulsatilla vulgaris Mill.

Synonyms
- Synonyms list: Anemone acutipetala Schleich.; Anemone bogenhardiana (Rchb.) Pritz.; Anemone collina Salisb.; Anemone intermedia Schult.; Anemone pratensis Sibth.; Anemone pulsatilla L.; Anemone pulsatilla f. henryi (Christ) Tosco; Anemone sylvestris Vill.; Anemone tenuifolia Schleich.; Pulsatilla amoena Jord.; Pulsatilla aperta Schur; Pulsatilla bogenhardiana Rchb.; Pulsatilla intermedia Sweet; Pulsatilla media Bogenh.; Pulsatilla oenipontana Dalla Torre & Sarnth.; Pulsatilla propera Jord.; Pulsatilla recta Gilib.; Pulsatilla transsilvanica Schur; Pulsatilla vulgaris subsp. anglica (W.Zimm.) P.D.Sell; Pulsatilla vulgaris var. anglica W.Zimm.

= Pulsatilla vulgaris =

Species of flowering plant

Pulsatilla vulgaris, the pasqueflower, is a species of flowering plant belonging to the buttercup family (Ranunculaceae), found locally on calcareous grassland in Europe, and widely cultivated in gardens. It was considered part of the genus Anemone, to which it is closely related. Several sources still list Anemone pulsatilla as the accepted name, with Pulsatilla vulgaris as a synonym.

Other variations of its common name include European pasqueflower and common pasqueflower. The name may also be split in two - pasque flower.

== Description ==
This herbaceous perennial plant develops upright rhizomes, which function as food-storage organs. Its leaves and stems are long, soft, silver-grey and hairy. It grows to 15–30 cm (6–12 in) high and when it is fruit-bearing up to 40 cm (16 in). The roots go 1 m (39 in) deep into the soil. The finely-dissected leaves are arranged in a rosette and appear with the bell-shaped flower in early spring. The purple flowers are followed by distinctive silky seed-heads which can persist on the plant for many months.

The flower is 'cloaked in myth'; one legend has it that Pasque flowers sprang up in places that had been soaked by the blood of Romans or Danes because they often appear on old barrows and boundary banks.

This plant has gained the Royal Horticultural Society's Award of Garden Merit.

== Designation ==
It is classified as a Priority Species in the UK Biodiversity Action Plan and as Vulnerable in Britain on the Red Data List.

== Location ==
It grows in sparsely wooded pine forests or meadows, often on a sunny sloping side with calcium-rich soil. A large colony occurs on publicly accessible land in the Cotswolds, UK, at the Gloucestershire Wildlife Trust's Pasqueflower reserve.

== Cultural Significance ==
It is the county flower of the English counties of Cambridgeshire and Hertfordshire.

== Varieties ==
While the species Pulsatilla vulgaris has purplish flowers; variants include red ('Rubra') and white ('Alba') forms (see images).

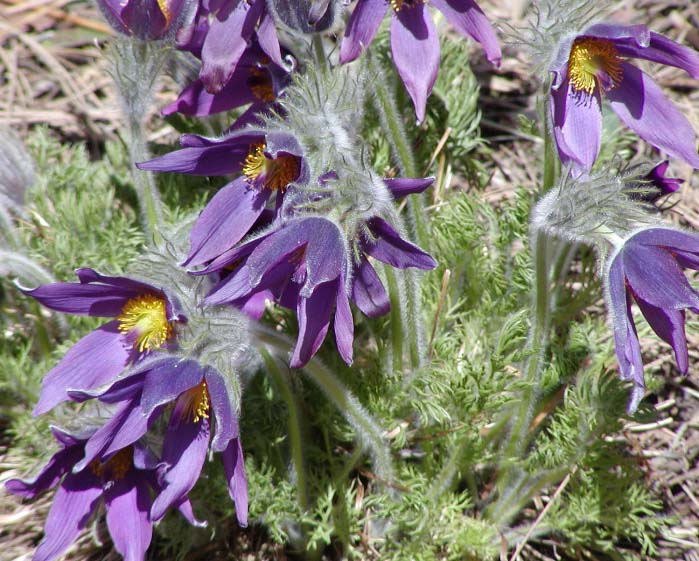

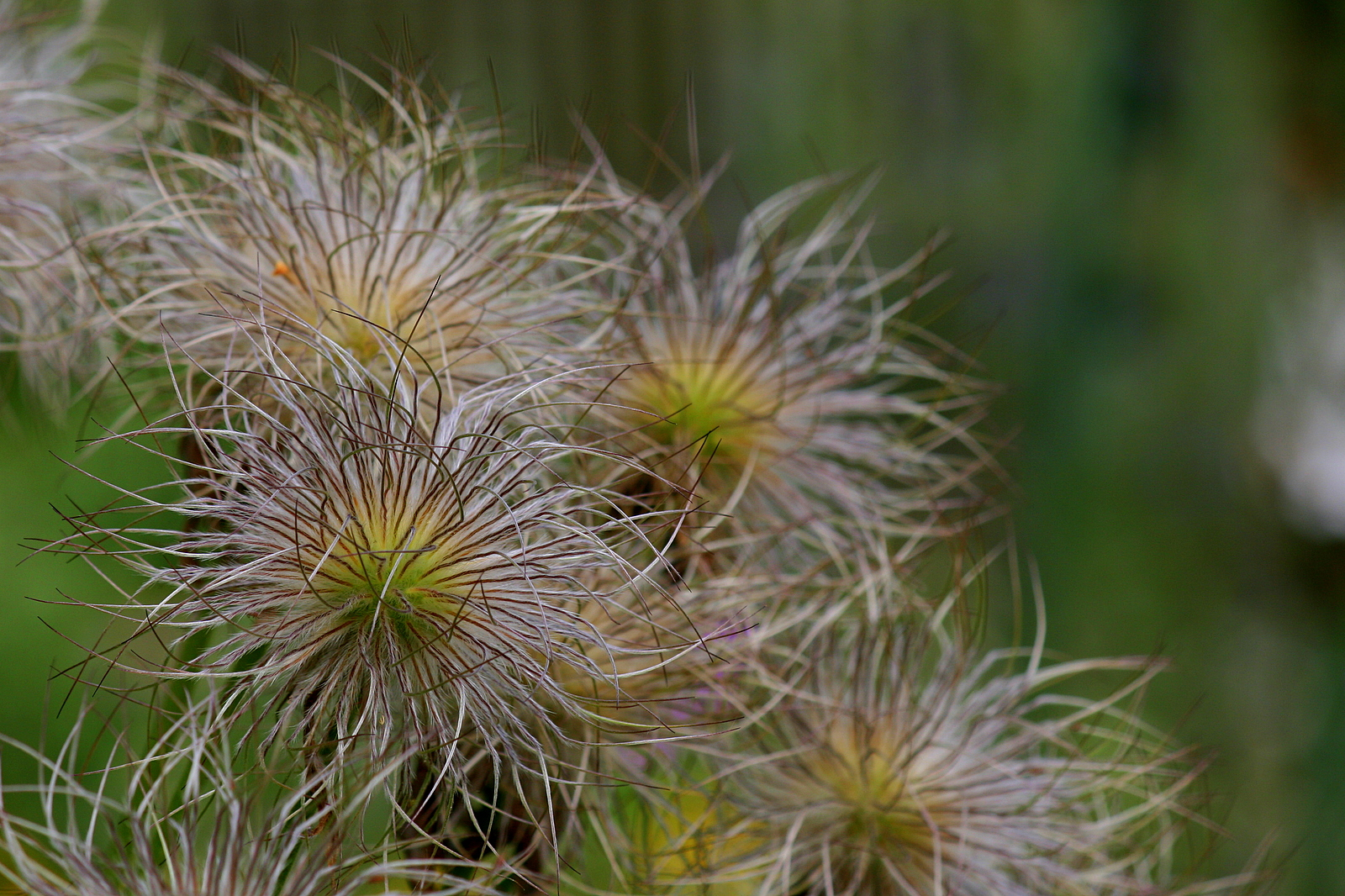

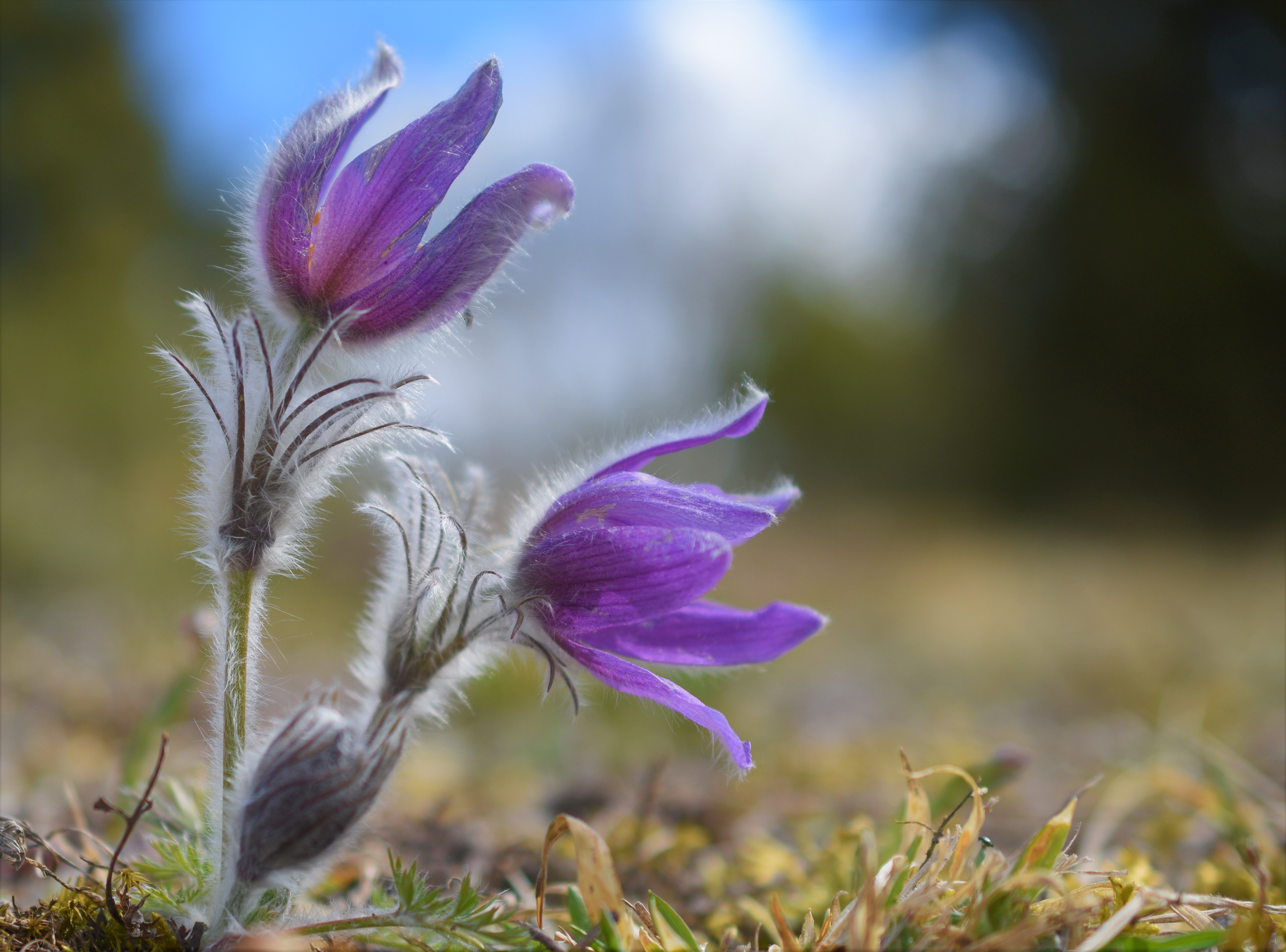

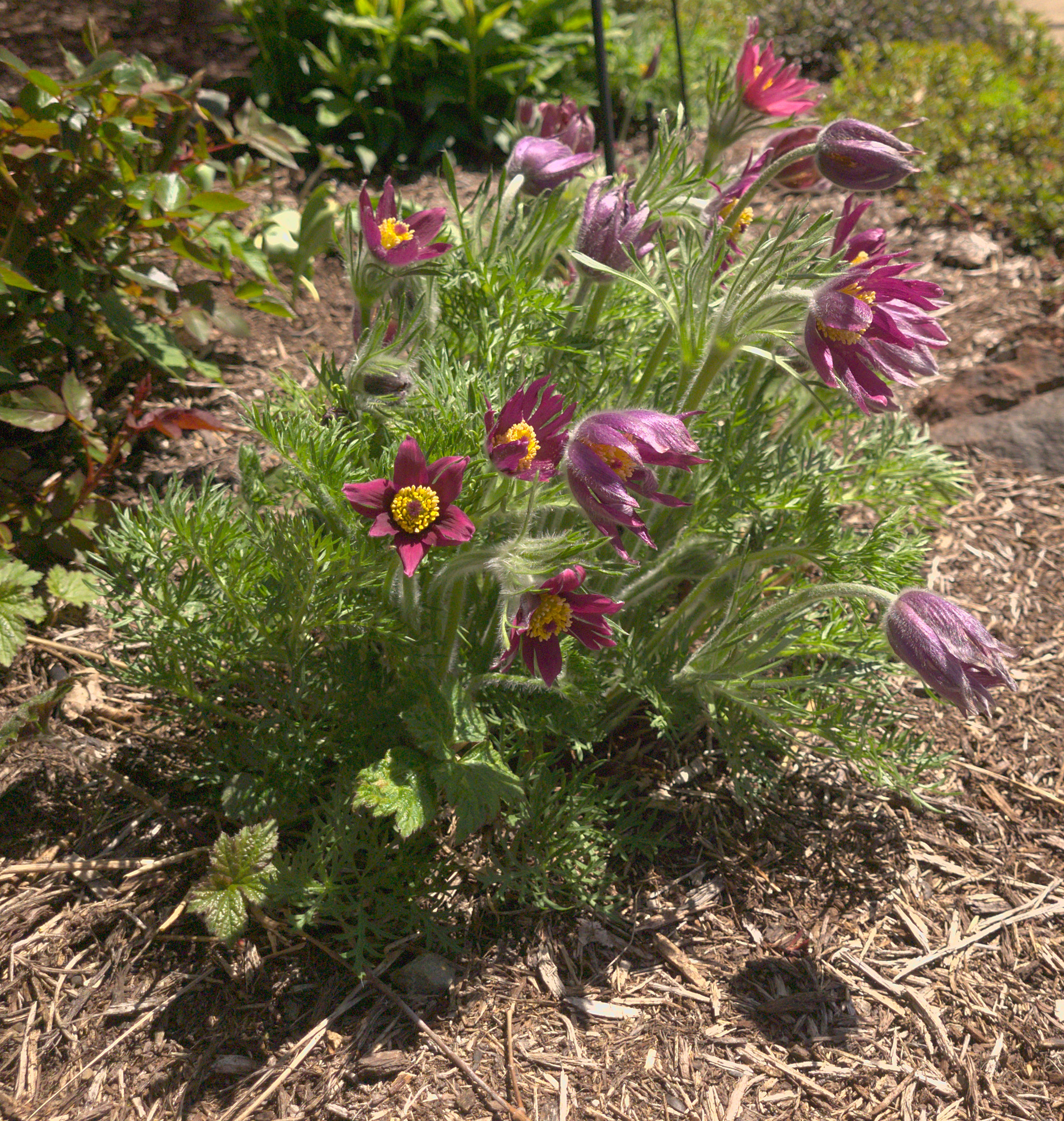

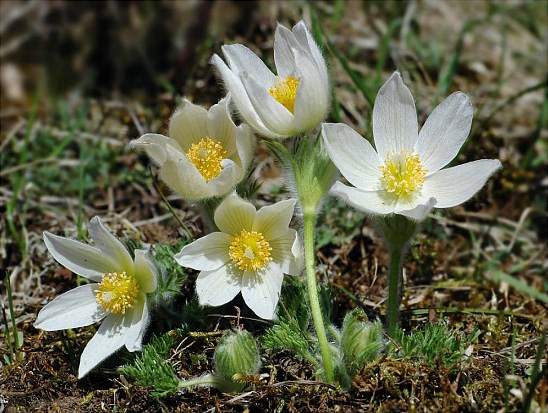
'Alba'

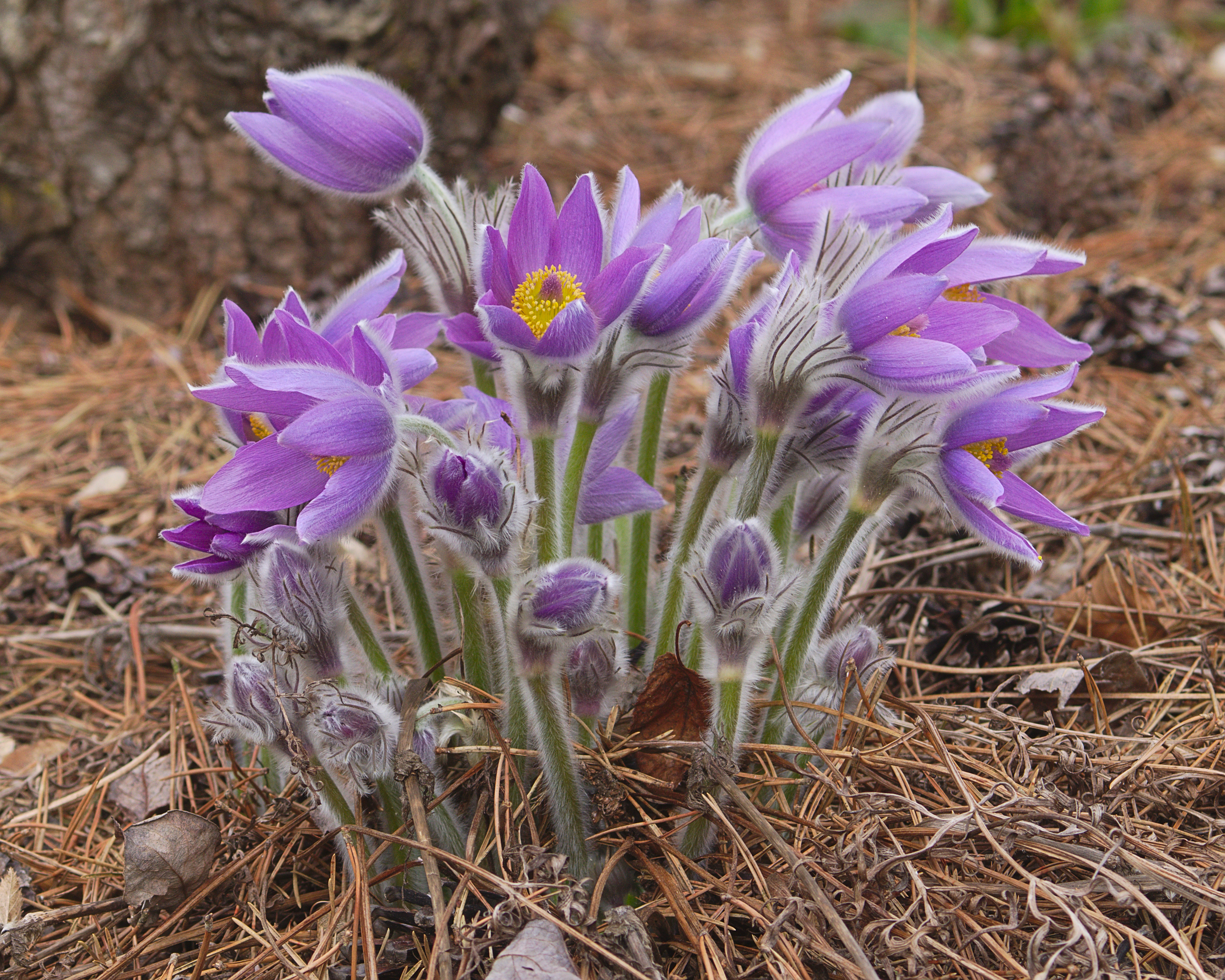
'Grandis'

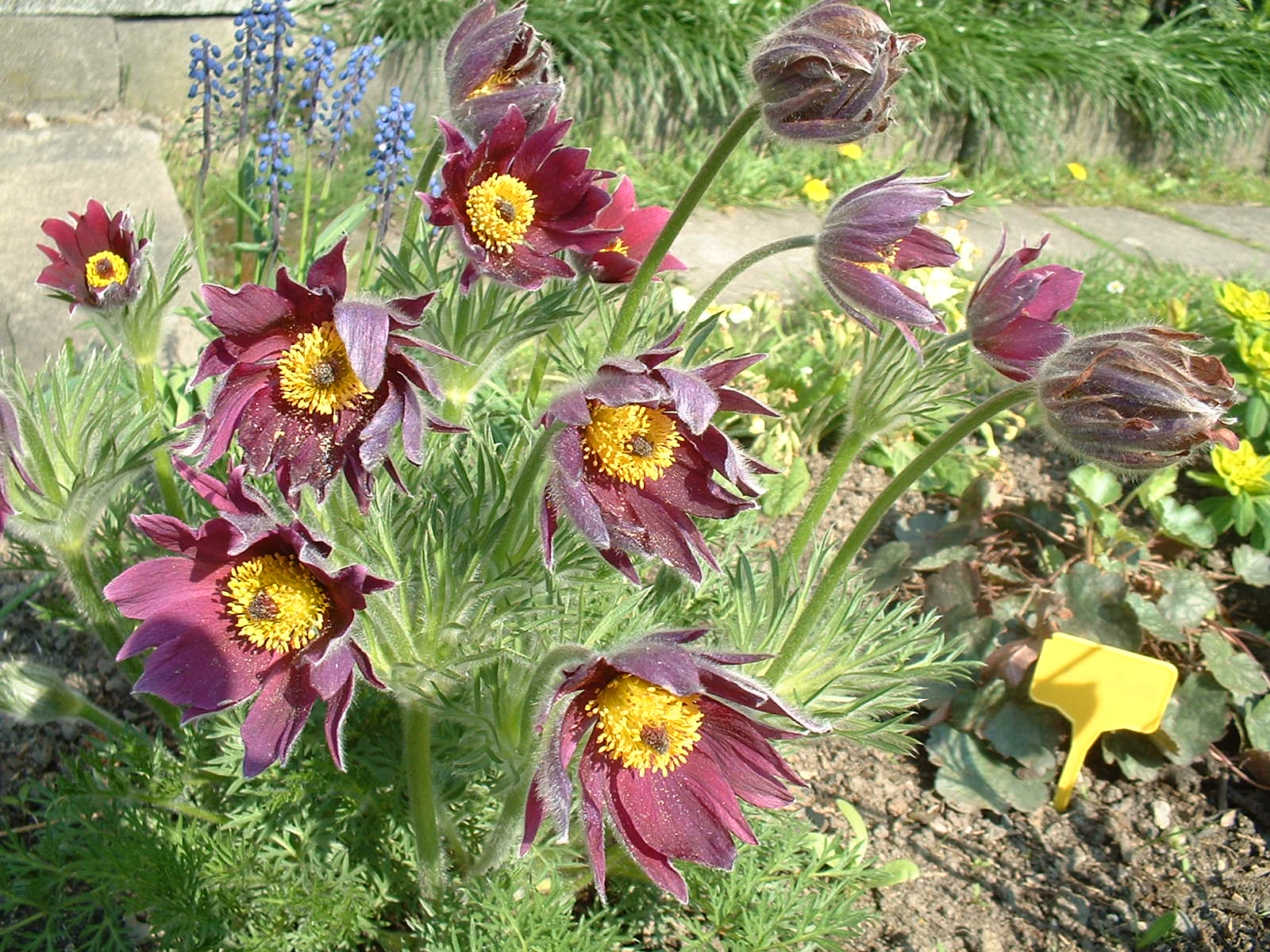
'Rubra'
