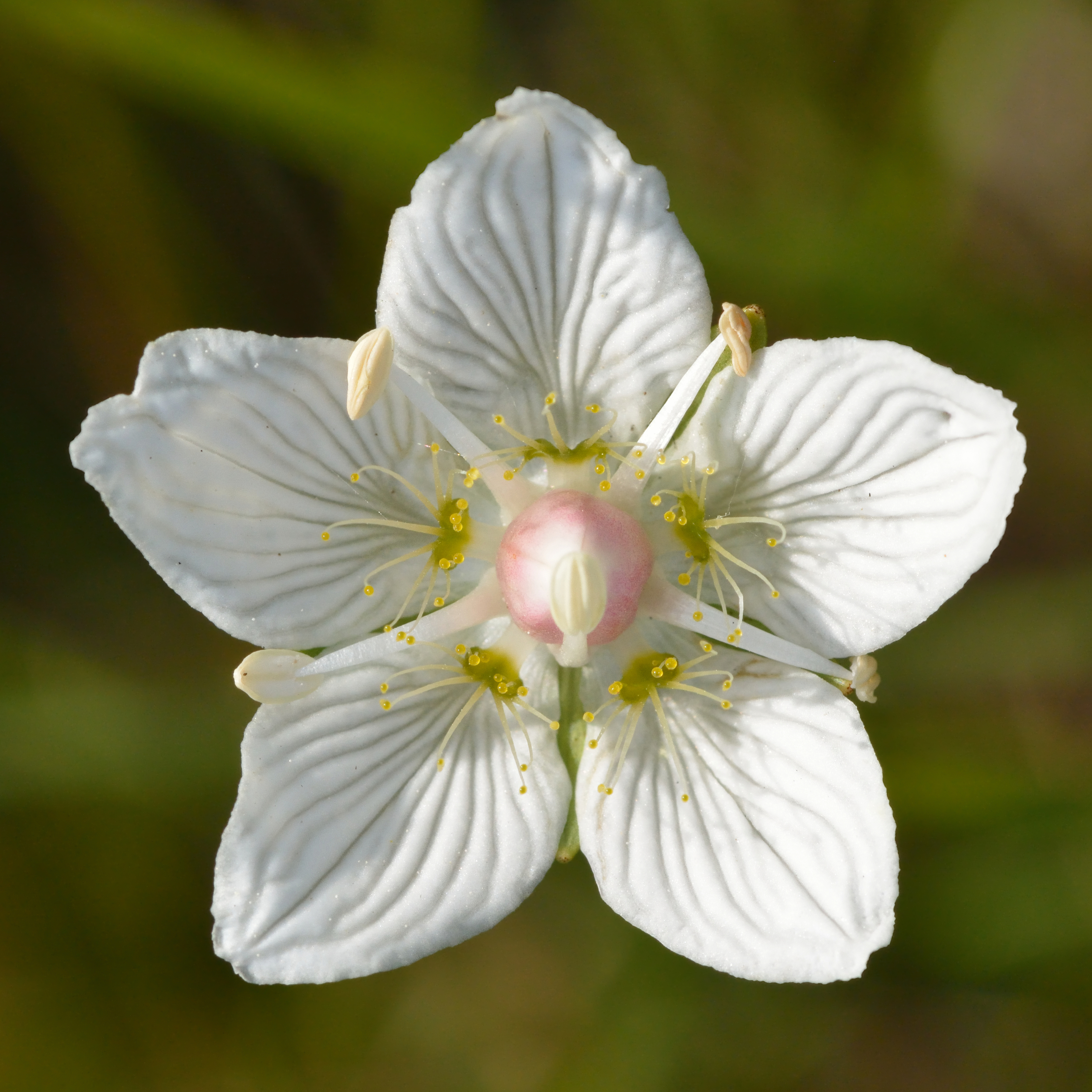

Conservation status
- Least Concern (IUCN 3.1)

- Secure (NatureServe)

Scientific classification
- Kingdom: Plantae
- Clade: Embryophytes
- Clade: Tracheophytes
- Clade: Angiosperms
- Clade: Eudicots
- Clade: Rosids
- Order: Celastrales
- Family: Celastraceae
- Genus: Parnassia
- Species: P. palustris

Binomial name
- Parnassia palustris L.

Varieties
- Parnassia palustris var. izuinsularis H.Ohba; Parnassia palustris var. palustris; Parnassia palustris var. yakusimensis (Masam.) H.Ohba

Synonyms
- Synonymy: synonyms of var. palustris: Enneadynamis polonorum Bubani; Parnassia alpina Dalla Torre; Parnassia californica (A.Gray) Greene; Parnassia ciliata Gilib.; Parnassia europaea Pers.; Parnassia montanensis Fernald & Rydb.; Parnassia mucronata Siebold & Zucc.; Parnassia multiseta (Ledeb.) Fernald; Parnassia neogaea (Fernald) Kharkev.; Parnassia obtusiflora Rupr.; Parnassia obtusiflora subsp. typica Á.Löve; Parnassia ovata Ledeb.; Parnassia palustris var. alpina Drude; Parnassia palustris var. armena Nábělek; Parnassia palustris var. californica A.Gray; Parnassia palustris subsp. californica (A.Gray) A.E.Murray; Parnassia palustris var. calycina Rouy & E.G.Camus; Parnassia palustris var. condensata Travis & Wheldon; Parnassia palustris var. incumbens Degen & Urum.; Parnassia palustris var. montanensis (Fernald & Rydb.) C.L.Hitchc.; Parnassia palustris f. multipetala H.Ohashi; Parnassia palustris subsp. multiseta (Ledeb.) Vorosch.; Parnassia palustris var. multiseta Ledeb.; Parnassia palustris f. nana T.C.Ku; Parnassia palustris var. neogaea Fernald; Parnassia palustris subsp. neogaea (Fernald) Hultén; Parnassia palustris subsp. obtusiflora (Rupr.) D.A.Webb; Parnassia palustris f. pygmaea Bolzon; Parnassia palustris f. rhodanthera H.Ohba & Umezu; Parnassia palustris var. rosea Hedbom; Parnassia palustris var. syukorankeiensis Yamam.; Parnassia palustris var. tenuis Wahlenb.; Parnassia palustris var. tenuis Wahlenb.; Parnassia palustris f. ussuriensis Kom. ex Nekr.; Parnassia palustris var. vulgaris Drude; Parnassia parviflora subsp. californica (A.Gray) Hultén; Parnassia tenuis (Wahlenb.) A.P.Khokhr. & V.N.Pavlov; Parnassia vanensis Azn.; Parnassia vulgaris Dum.Cours. synonyms of var. yakusimensis: Parnassia yakusimensis Masam.; Parnassia palustris f. minima Masam.

= Parnassia palustris =

Species of flowering plant in the staff-vine family

Parnassia palustris, the marsh grass of Parnassus, northern grass-of-Parnassus, or just grass-of-Parnassus, and bog star, is a flowering plant in the staff-vine family Celastraceae.

It is the county flower of Cumberland in England, and appears on its flag.

The name comes from ancient Greece: evidently the cattle on Mount Parnassus appreciated the plant; hence it was an "honorary grass". The specific epithet palustris is Latin for "of the marsh" and indicates its common habitat. It was described by the Greek physician Dioscorides, growing up a mountain in 1st century AD.

== Description ==
This perennial plant is not a grass, nor does it look like one, but grows from a short underground stem. It has long stemmed heart-shaped leaves, which are 4–12 in (10–30 cm) long. In the centre of the leaf, is the flowering stem. The stem holds a solitary white flower, blooming between July and October. The flower has 5 stamens around the centre. The flower produces a honey-like scent to attract pollinators.

== Range and distribution ==
Parnassia palustris is native to northern temperate parts of Eurasia where it is found in wet moorlands and marshes. It is now extinct in Algeria.

== Varieties ==
Three varieties are accepted.

- Parnassia palustris var. izuinsularis H.Ohba – Izu Islands
- Parnassia palustris var. palustris – northern temperate and montane Eurasia and North America
- Parnassia palustris var. yakusimensis (Masam.) H.Ohba – Yakushima Island

== Uses ==
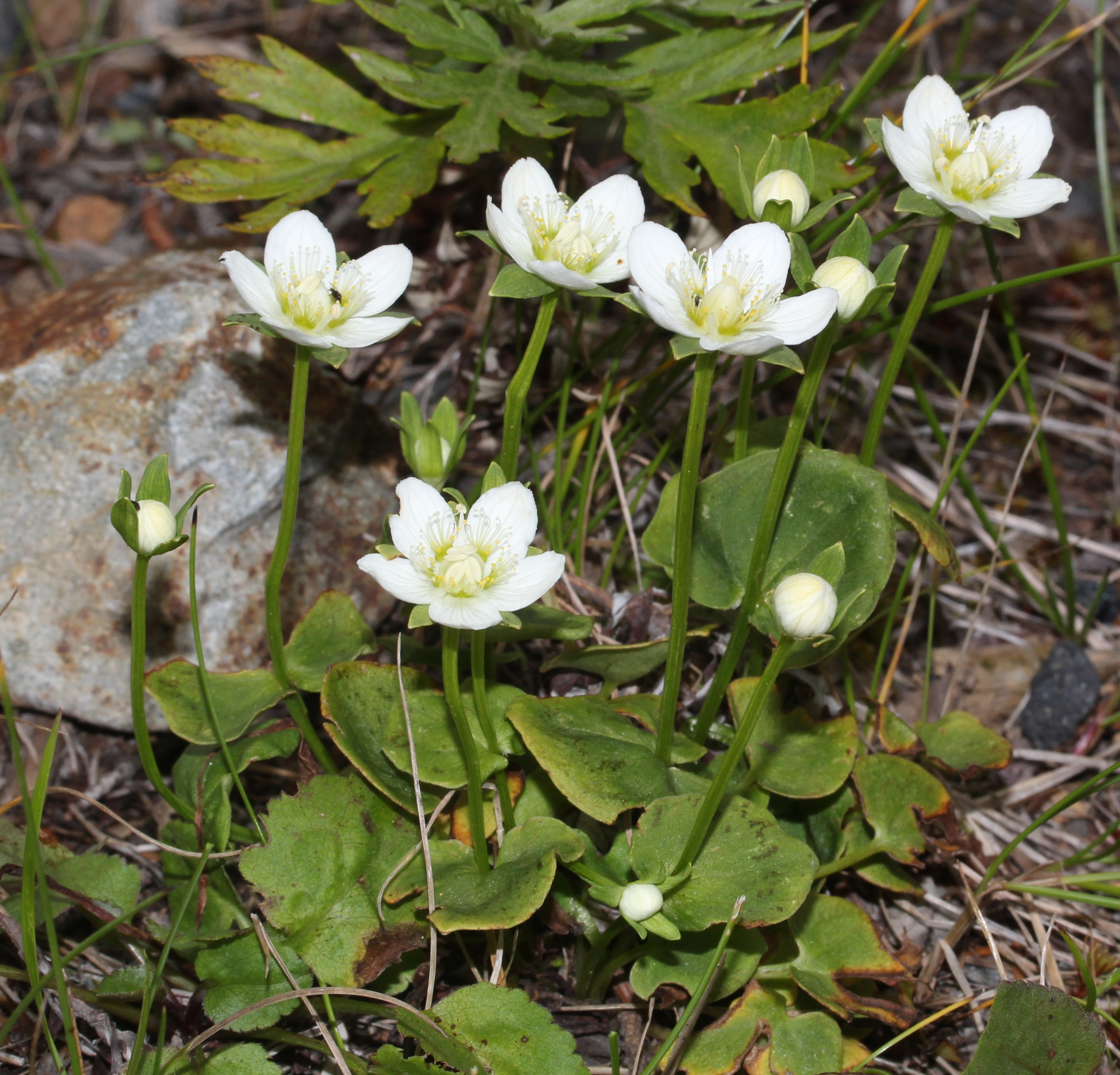
Seen on Mount Ontake, Otaki, Nagano prefecture, Japan

It was once used in herbal medicines, to treat disorders of the liver. An infusion of the leaves, (similar to a tea) was also used to treat indigestion. When added to wine or water, the leaves are claimed to dissolve kidney stones. It is also seen in the Cumberland flag, which is a historic English county and is within County Cumbria.

== History ==
While finishing his schooling in the School of Mines at Freiberg from June 14, 1791, to February 26, 1792, Alexander von Humboldt published three articles on plants in the Annalen der Botanik. These were his first of what the world famous explorer would produce. Notably, one was concerning "On the Motion of the Filaments of the Parnassia Palustris."
