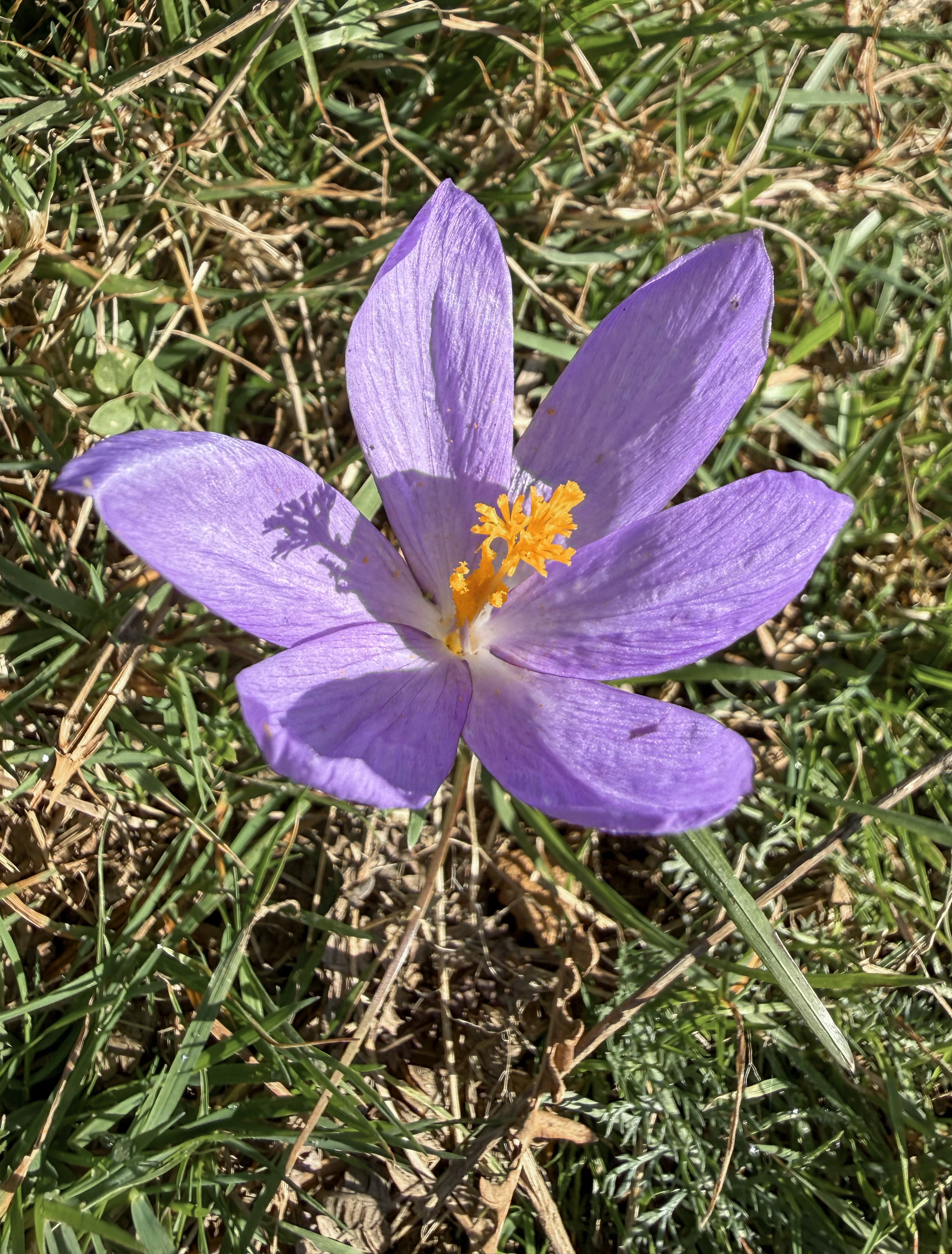

Scientific classification
- Kingdom: Plantae
- Clade: Tracheophytes
- Clade: Angiosperms
- Clade: Monocots
- Order: Asparagales
- Family: Iridaceae
- Genus: Crocus
- Species: C. nudiflorus

Binomial name
- Crocus nudiflorus Sm. 1798

Synonyms
- Crocus aphyllus Ker Gawl.; Crocus fimbriatus Lapeyr.; Crocus hybernus var. pyrenaeus (Herb.) Nyman; Crocus medius Balb.; Crocus multifidus Ramond; Crocus multifidus G.Bergeret [Illegitimate]; Crocus pyrenaeus Herb.

= Crocus nudiflorus =

Species of flowering plant

Crocus nudiflorus is a species of flowering plant in the genus Crocus of the family Iridaceae. It is an autumn-flowering, dwarf, deciduous perennial found in western Europe from southwestern France to Spain. It has been cultivated since Tudor times in Great Britain, where it is now naturalized.

== Description ==
Crocus nudiflorus grows from corms, which spread out into clumps of plants by stolons. Each corm usually sends out one long-tubed, goblet-shaped, or bell-shaped flower. The bloom appears in autumn, or at the end of summer. The colour ranges from deep purple to lilac-purple with a paler throat and bright orange or yellow stigma. The linear, basal leaves, usually with a silvery central stripe, are produced in winter and spring following the autumn flowers, when the fruits appear.

== Taxonomy ==
The Latin specific epithet nudiflorus means 'naked flower', in reference to the flower emerging before the leaves.

It was published and described by James Edward Smith in 'English Botany' Volume 7 on table 491 in 1798.

== Distribution and habitat ==
Crocus nudiflorus is native to southwestern France and Spain.

== Habitat ==
It is found on roadsides, meadows and pastures. It often grows in pastures with other crocus species including Crocus vernus subsp. albiflorus, but it is often eaten by wild boars.

== Uses ==
It has been used in folk medicine as an anti-spasmodic, as an abortive and a sedative.

== Culture ==
In 2002, it was voted by the public as the county flower of Nottinghamshire.
