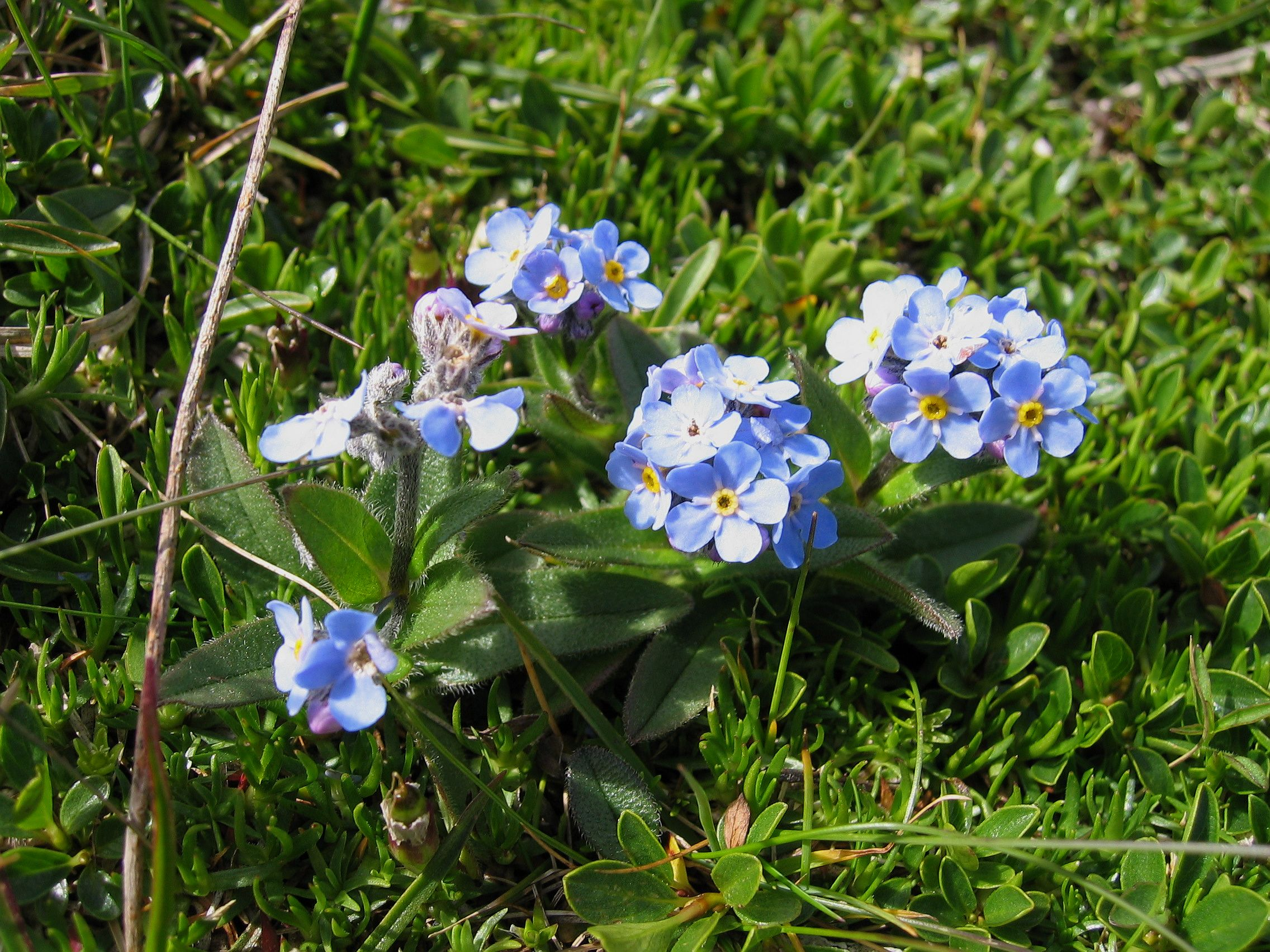

Scientific classification
- Kingdom: Plantae
- Clade: Tracheophytes
- Clade: Angiosperms
- Clade: Eudicots
- Clade: Asterids
- Order: Boraginales
- Family: Boraginaceae
- Genus: Myosotis
- Species: M. alpestris

Binomial name
- Myosotis alpestris F.W.Schmidt

= Myosotis alpestris =

Species of flowering plant

Myosotis alpestris, the alpine forget-me-not, is a herbaceous perennial plant in the flowering plant family Boraginaceae. The alpine forget-me-not is the county flower of Westmorland in the United Kingdom.

== Distribution ==
Its native distribution includes much of western, southern and central Europe and the Caucasus, east to central Asia. In Great Britain it occurs in only two localities, in limestone grassland in the North Pennines, and at high elevation on mica schist on and nearby Ben Lawers.

== Taxonomy ==
Four subspecies are accepted:

- Myosotis alpestris subsp. alpestris — throughout the range of the species
- Myosotis alpestris subsp. mrkvickana (Velen.) Strid — North Macedonia to northern Greece
- Myosotis alpestris subsp. pyrenaica (Douin) Litard. — Pyrenees
- Myosotis alpestris subsp. suaveolens (Waldst. & Kit. ex Willd.) Strid — Balkan Peninsula

A former subspecies Myosotis alpestris subsp. asiatica, native to Asia and northwestern North America, is now treated as a separate species, Myosotis asiatica (Vestergr.) Schischk. & Serg.
