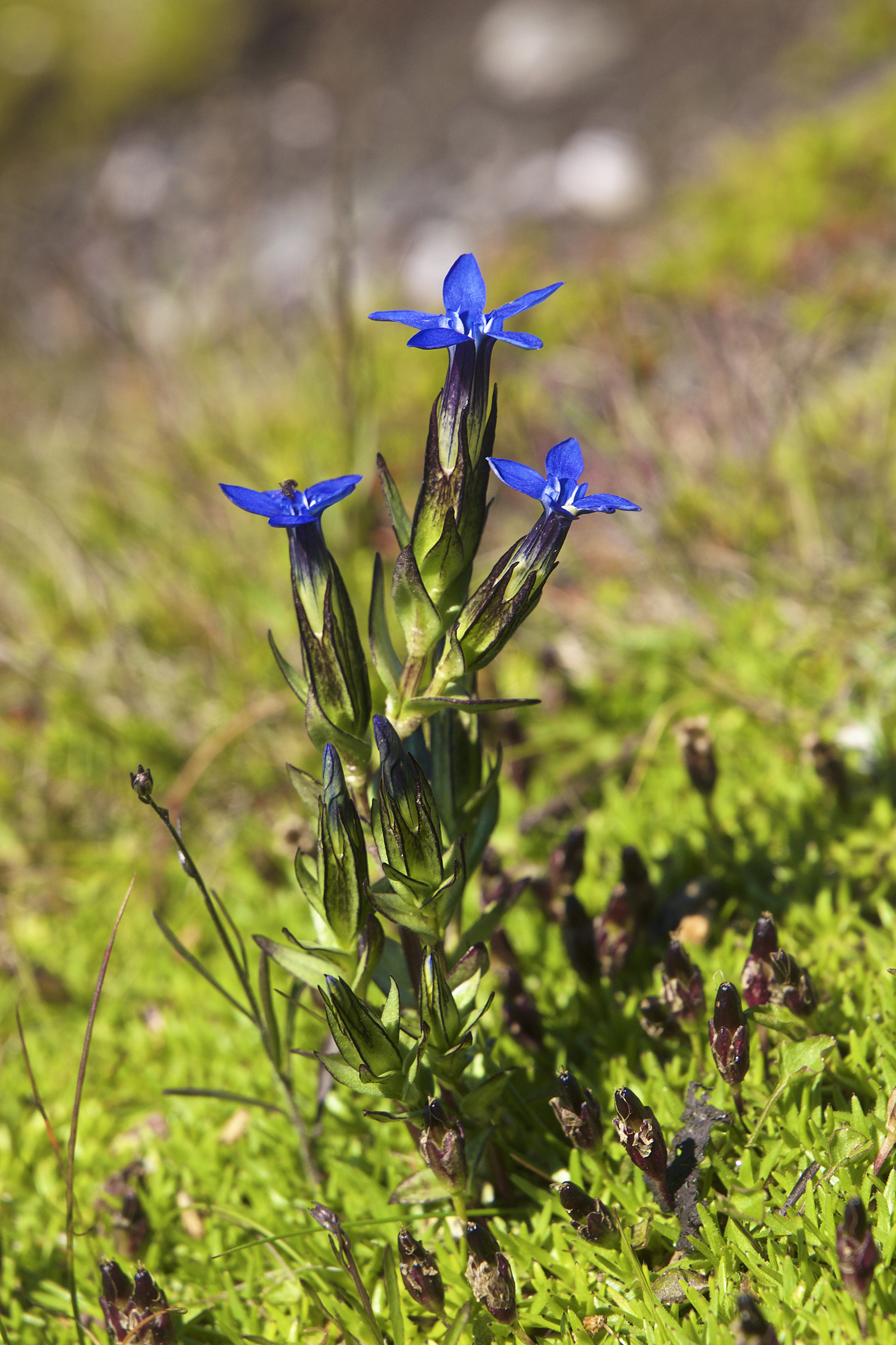

Scientific classification
- Kingdom: Plantae
- Clade: Tracheophytes
- Clade: Angiosperms
- Clade: Eudicots
- Clade: Asterids
- Order: Gentianales
- Family: Gentianaceae
- Genus: Gentiana
- Species: G. nivalis

Binomial name
- Gentiana nivalis L.

= Gentiana nivalis =

Species of plant

Gentiana nivalis, the snow gentian or Alpine gentian, is a species of the genus Gentiana. It grows to a height of 3–15 centimetres (1.2–5.9 in).

It is the county flower of Perthshire in the United Kingdom, and became a protected species in that country in 1975 under the Conservation of Wild Creatures and Wild Plants Act.

It is also one of the national flowers of Austria and Switzerland.

Nord-Aurdal Municipality in Norway has G. nivalis in its coat of arms.
