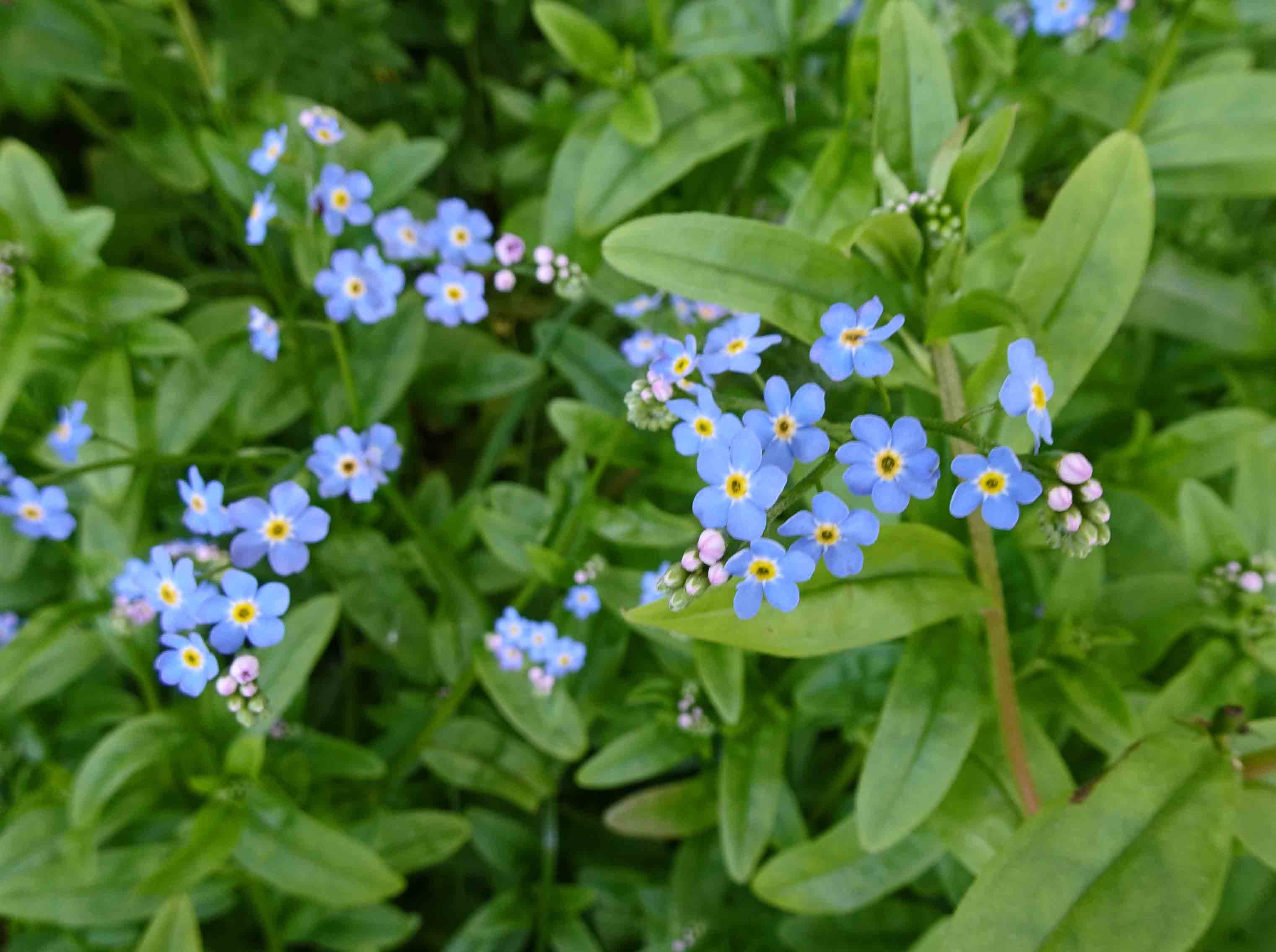
- Myosotis asiatica near the Mendenhall Glacier, Alaska

Scientific classification
- Kingdom: Plantae
- Clade: Tracheophytes
- Clade: Angiosperms
- Clade: Eudicots
- Clade: Asterids
- Order: Boraginales
- Family: Boraginaceae
- Genus: Myosotis
- Species: M. asiatica

Binomial name
- Myosotis asiatica (Vestergr.) Schischk. & Serg.

= Myosotis asiatica =

Species of flowering plant

Myosotis asiatica, the Asian forget-me-not, is a perennial herbaceous plant in the flowering plant family Boraginaceae, native to most of Asia and northwestern North America. It was formerly often treated as a subspecies of the European Myosotis alpestris (Alpine forget-me-not), as M. alpestris subsp. asiatica Vestergr.

The Asian forget-me-not is the only species of forget-me-not native in Alaska in the United States, where "forget-me-not" (generically) is the official state flower. It grows well throughout Alaska in open, rocky places high in the mountains, flowering in midsummer. Native habitats include moist mountainous areas on wooded slopes and grassy meadows.
