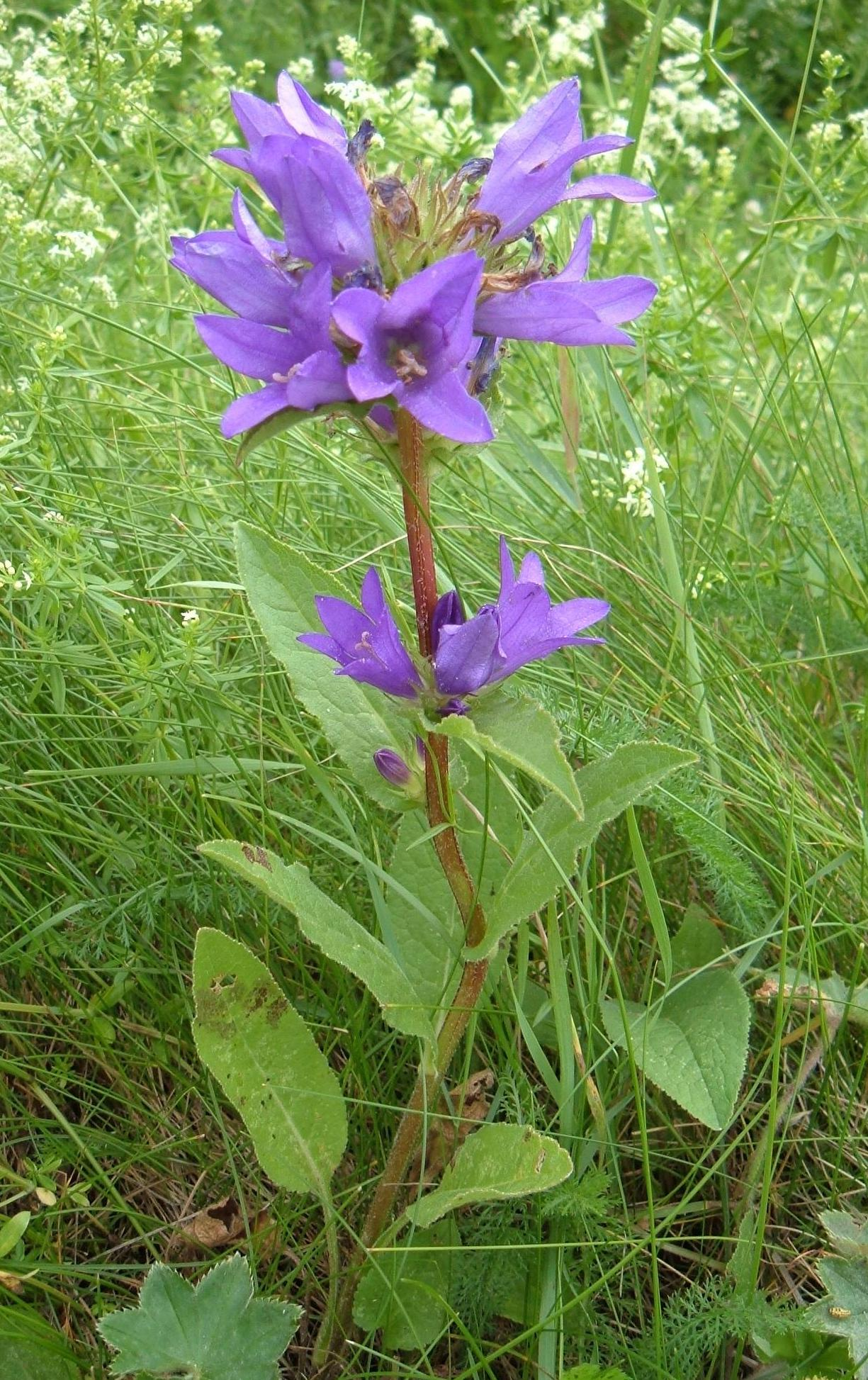

Scientific classification
- Kingdom: Plantae
- Clade: Tracheophytes
- Clade: Angiosperms
- Clade: Eudicots
- Clade: Asterids
- Order: Asterales
- Family: Campanulaceae
- Genus: Campanula
- Species: C. glomerata

Binomial name
- Campanula glomerata L.

= Campanula glomerata =

Species of plant

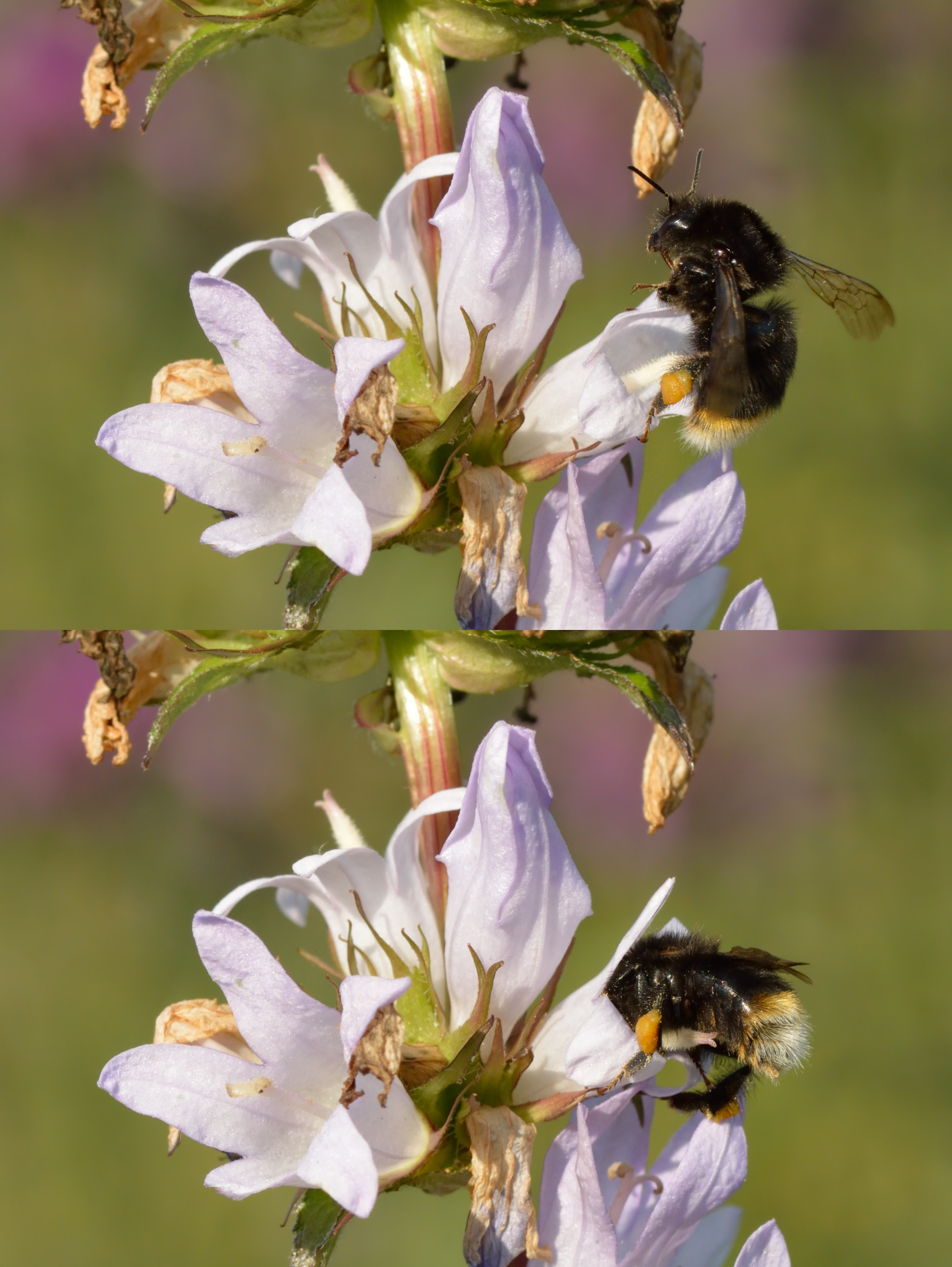
Pollination

Campanula glomerata, known by the common names clustered bellflower or Dane's blood, is a species of flowering plant in the genus Campanula, belonging to the family Campanulaceae. It is the county flower of Rutland, England.

== Etymology ==
The genus Latin name (Campanula), meaning small bell, refers to the bell-shape of the flower, while the specific name (glomerata) refers to the tight grouping of the flowers at the top of the stem.

== Description ==
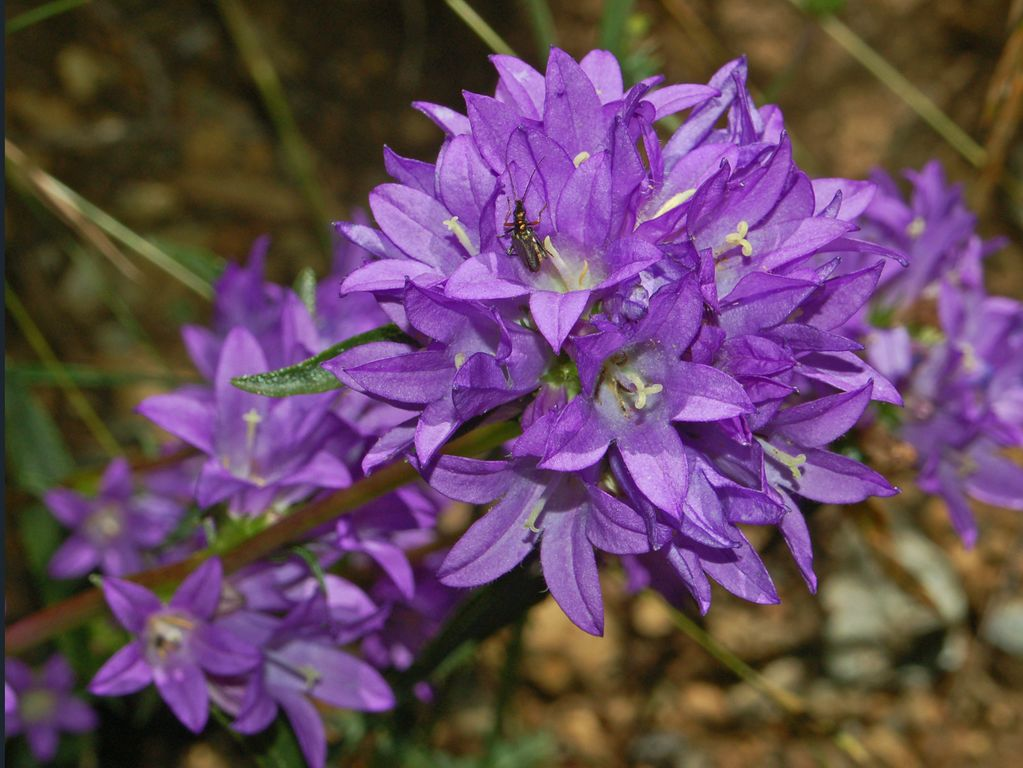
Inflorescence of Campanula glomerata

Campanula glomerata is a perennial herbaceous plant growing to a height of 20–60 centimetres (7.9–23.6 in), with a maximum of 90 centimetres (35 in). The stem is simple, erect and shortly pubescent, basal leaves are petiolated, oval-lanceolate and lightly heart-shaped (cordate), while cauline leaves are lanceolate, sessile and amplexicaul. The inflorescence is formed by 15-20 sessile, actinomorphic and hermaphrodite single flowers of about 2 to 3 cm. They are in terminal racemes or in the axils of upper leaves, surrounded by an involucre of bracts. The corolla is campanulate and pubescent with five dark violet-blue or purplish-blue petals. Flowering period is from June to September.

== Distribution and habitat ==
The species is native to the North Temperate Zone of Eurasia, from Britain to Japan. In Europe it is present almost everywhere except the extreme north. In North America the plant is naturalized.

This plant can be found in forests or dry grasslands, in scrub and open woodland, in grassy but not too wet places, in the edges of woods and along the margins of roads and trails. It prefers calcareous soils, at an altitude up to 1,500 m (4,921 ft) above sea level.

== Subspecies ==
According to WCSP, 15 subspecies are recognized:

- Campanula glomerata subsp. glomerata - Europe to NW. China
- Campanula glomerata subsp. cervicarioides (Schult.) Arcang. (1882) - S. Europe
- Campanula glomerata subsp. serotina (Wettst.) O.Schwarz (1949) - S. Alps
- Campanula glomerata subsp. farinosa (Rochel ex Besser) Kirschl. (1852) - Alps to E. Europe to Kazakhstan
- Campanula glomerata subsp. elliptica (Kit. ex Schult.) Kirschl. (1851) - Carpathians to C. Italy and Serbia
- Campanula glomerata subsp. subcapitata (Popov) Fed. (1973) - E. Carpathians
- Campanula glomerata subsp. hispida (Witasek) Hayek (1930) - N. Balkan Pen. to Iran
- Campanula glomerata subsp. caucasica (Trautv.) Ogan. (1995) - NE. Turkey to Caucasus
- Campanula glomerata subsp. oblongifolia (K.Koch) Fed. (1972) - E. Turkey to NE. Iran
- Campanula glomerata subsp. oblongifolioides (Galushko) Ogan. (1995) - Caucasus
- Campanula glomerata subsp. symphytifolia (Albov) Ogan. (1995) - W. Transcaucasus
- Campanula glomerata subsp. panjutinii (Kolak.) Victorov (2002) - W. Transcaucasus
- Campanula glomerata subsp. krylovii Olonova (1999) - W. Siberia
- Campanula glomerata subsp. daqingshanica D.Y.Hong & Y.Z.Zhao (1983) - Inner Mongolia
- Campanula glomerata subsp. speciosa (Hornem. ex Spreng.) Domin (1936) - S. Siberia to Japan (Kyushu)

== Cultivation ==
The plant is widely cultivated in gardens, with flowers in a range of colours including white, pink, blue and purple. Numerous cultivars have been developed for garden use, including 'Joan Elliott' (with large violet flowers) and the white-flowered 'Schneekrone'. The vigorous cultivar 'Superba', growing to 60 cm (24 in), with rich blue flowers, has gained the Royal Horticultural Society's Award of Garden Merit. The pale purple cluster-flowered 'Caroline' has also won the award.

== Gallery ==
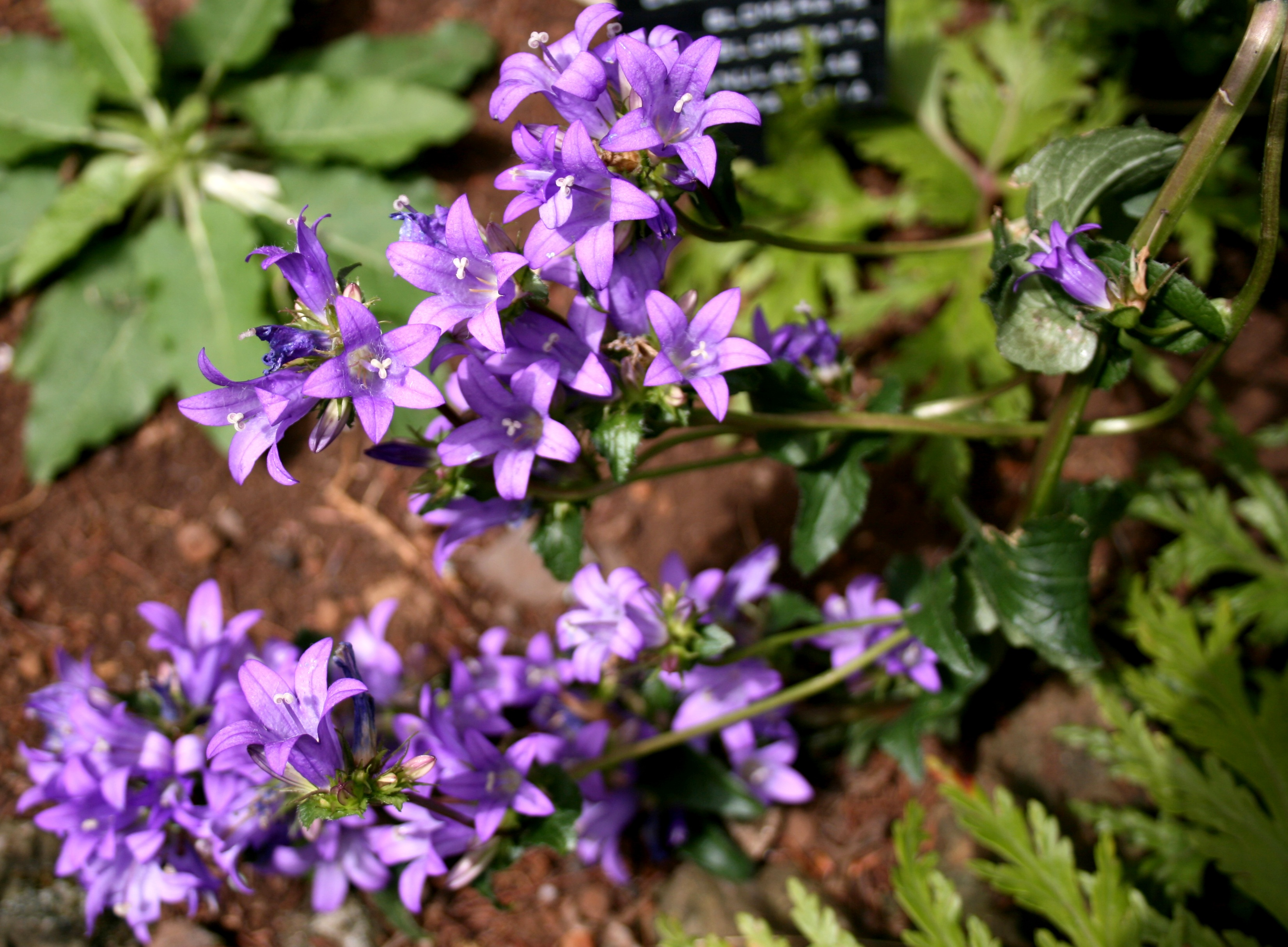
Funchal: Botanical garden

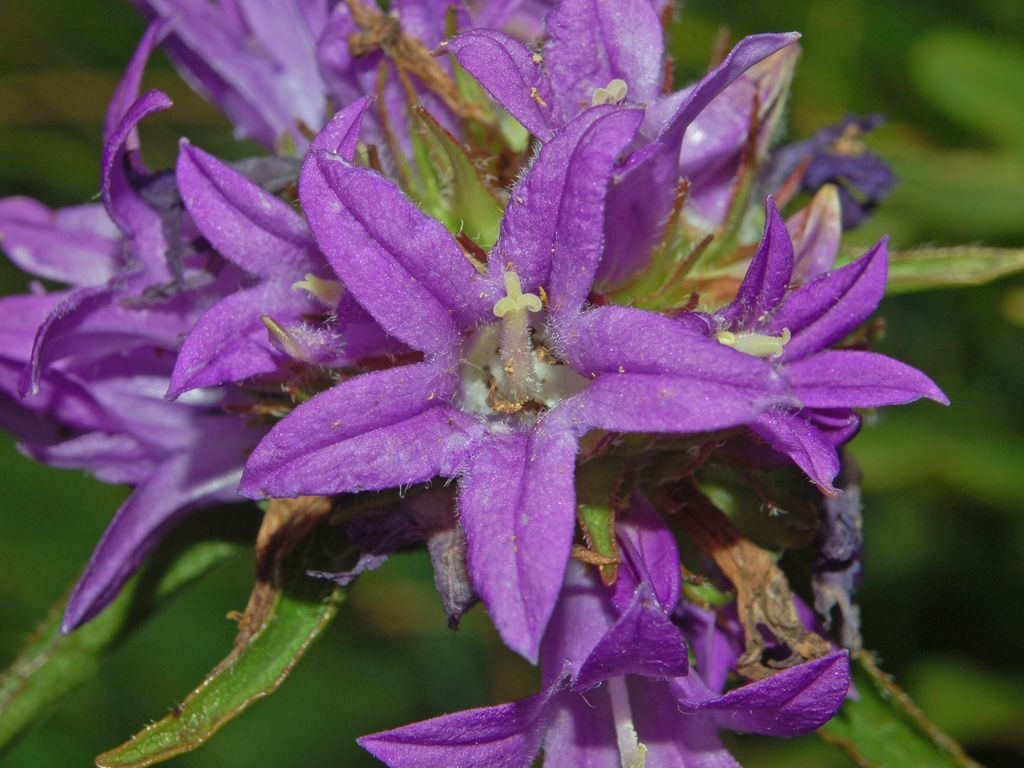

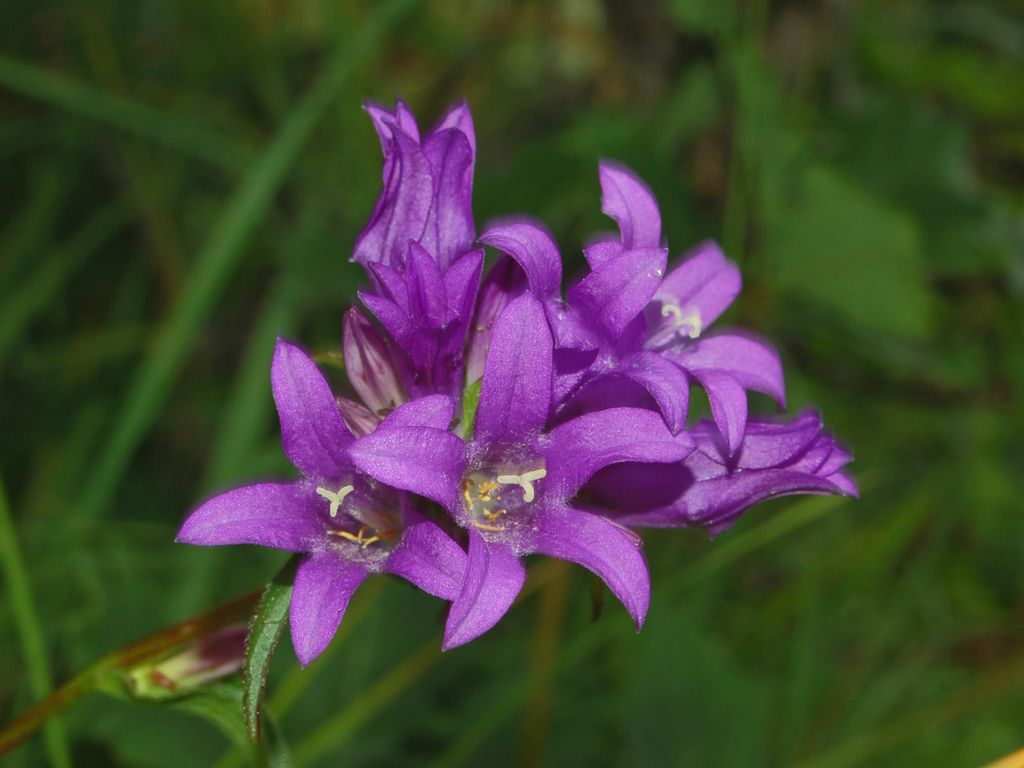

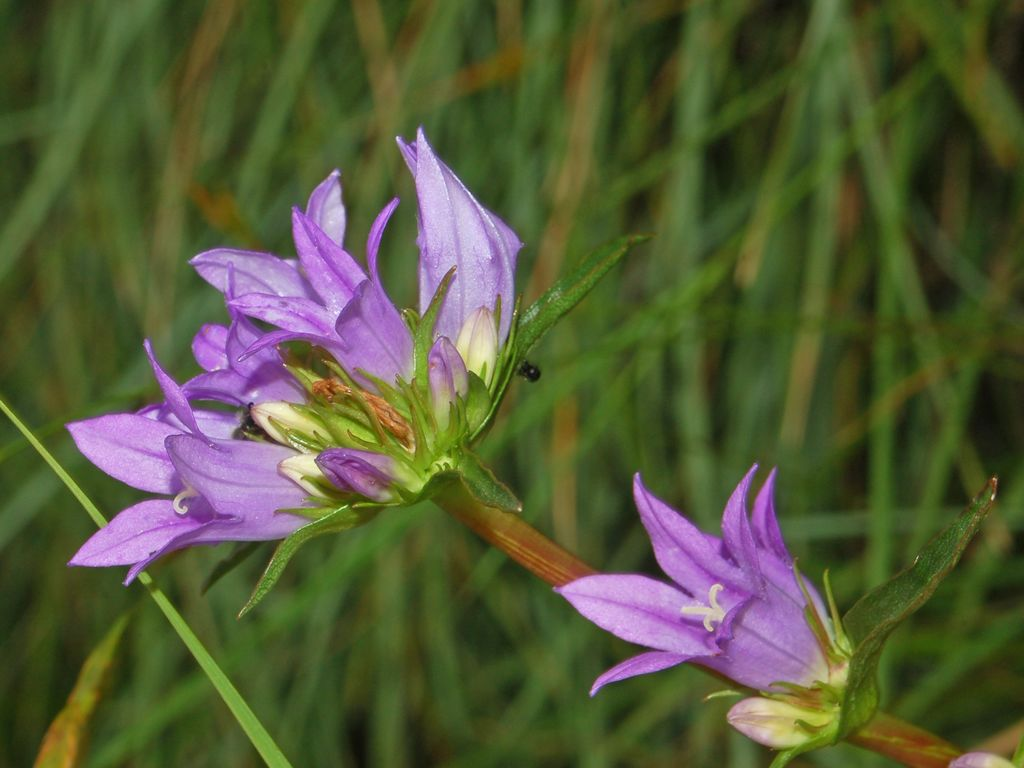

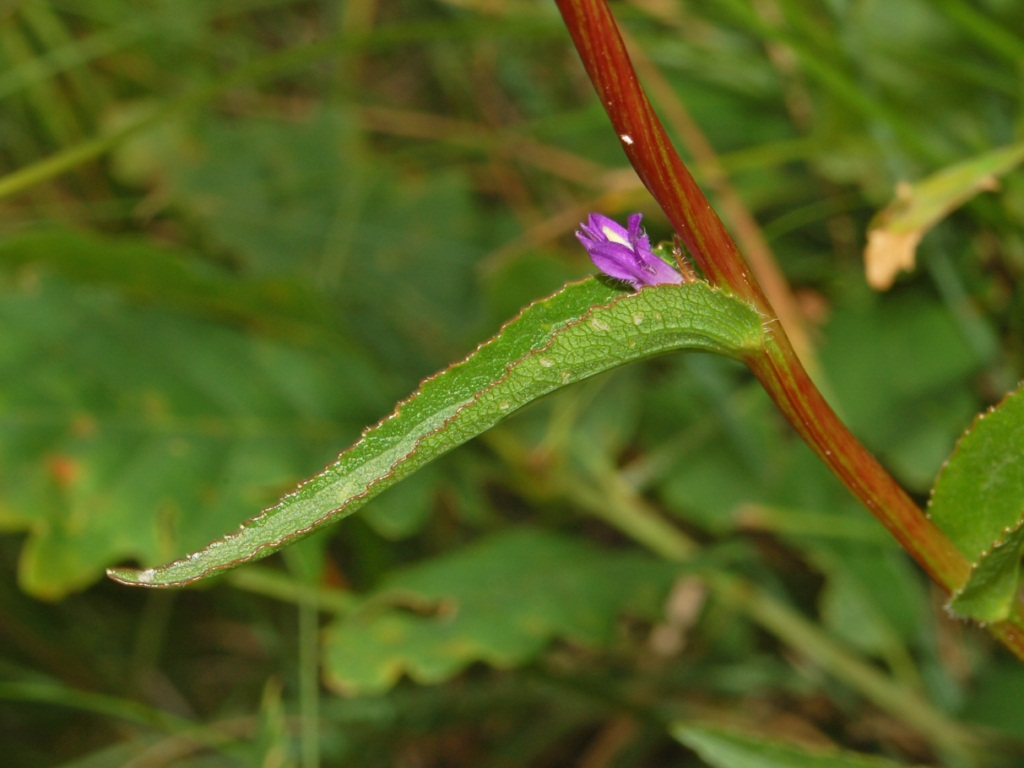
Cauline leaf with a flower in the axil

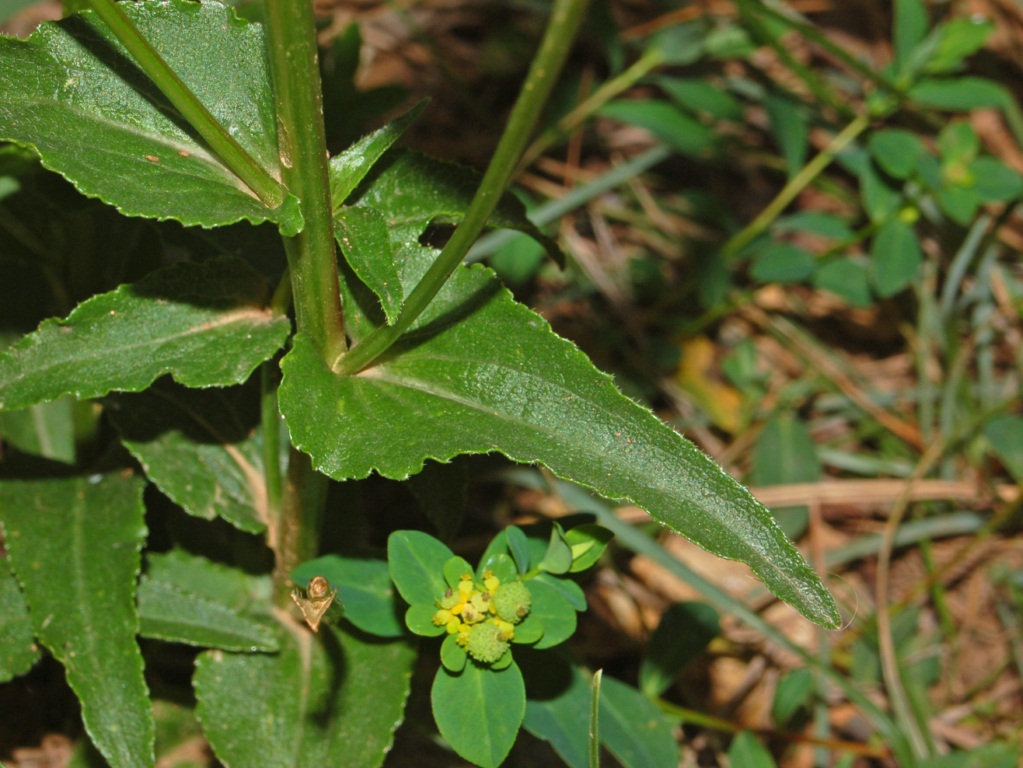
Basal leaf

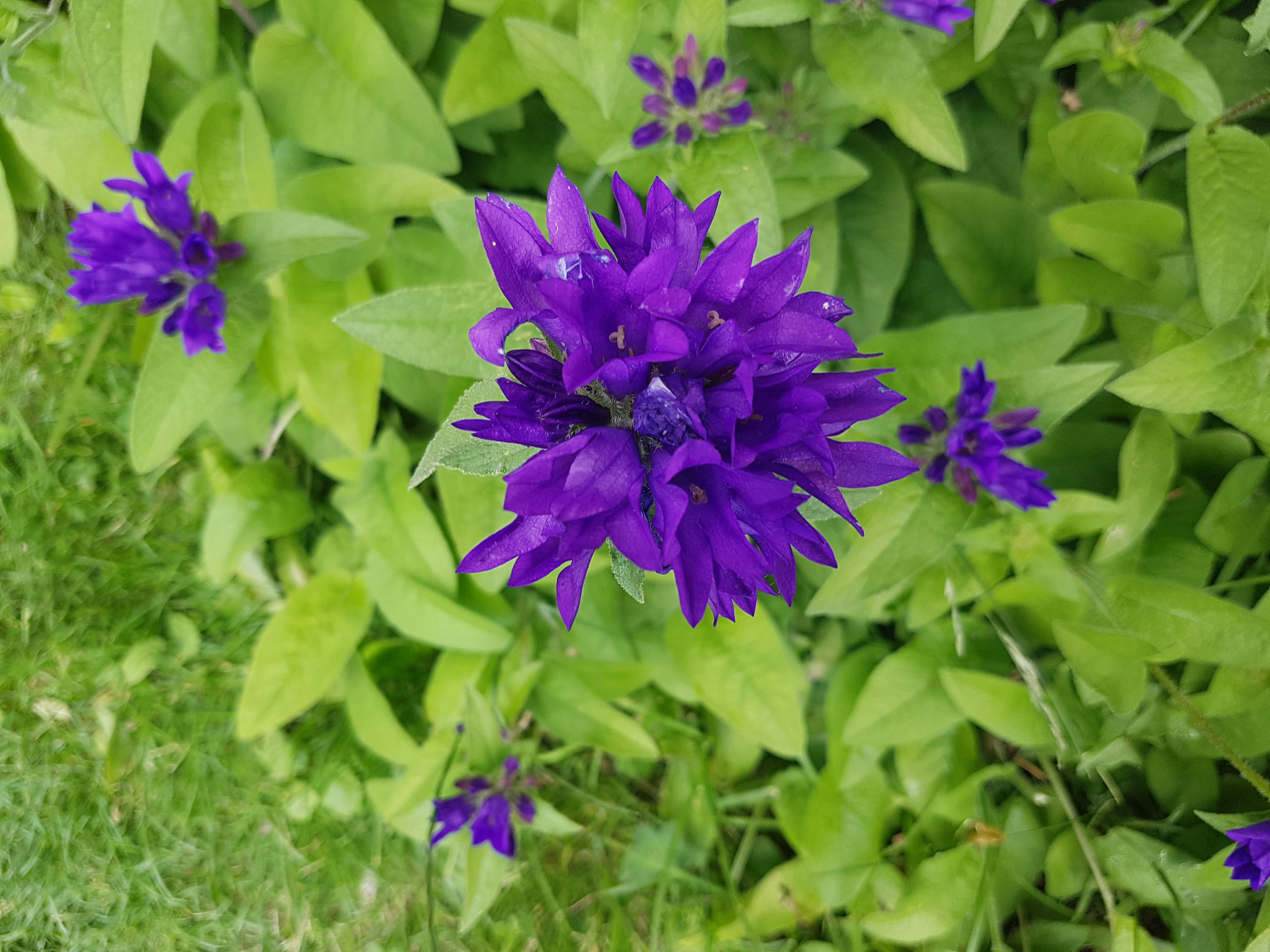

== Synonyms ==
- Campanula aggregata Willd. ex Schlecht. (1813) (synonym = C. glomerata subsp. glomerata)
- Campanula cervicarioides Schultes in Roemer & Schultes (1819) (synonym = C. glomerata subsp. cervicarioide)
- Campanula congesta Schultes in Roemer & Schultes (1819) (synonym = C. glomerata subsp. glomerata)
- Campanula farinosa Andrz. in Besser (1821) ( synonym = C. glomerata subsp. farinosa)
- Campanula glomerata subsp. aggregata (Willd.) Kirschleger (1851) (synonym = C. glomerata subsp. glomerata)
- Campanula glomerata subsp. cephalotes (Fisch. ex Schrank) D.Y.Hong (1983) (synonym = C. glomerata subsp. speciosa)
- Campanula glomerata subsp. congesta (Roemer & Schultes) Schubler & Martens (1834) ( synonym = C. glomerata subsp. glomerata)
- Campanula glomerata var. aggregata (Willd.) Koch (1846) (synonym = C. glomerata subsp. glomerata)
- Campanula glomerata var. congesta (Roemer & Schultes) Rouy (1908) (synonym = C. glomerata subsp. glomerata)
- Campanula glomerata var. dahurica Fisch. ex Ker-Gawl. (1822) ( synonym = C. glomerata subsp. speciosa)
- Campanula glomerata var. farinosa (Andrz.) Koch (1846) (synonym = C. glomerata subsp. farinosa)
- Campanula glaucophylla Schlosser & Vukot. (1875) (synonym = C. glomerata subsp. farinosa)
- Campanula speciosa Hornem. (1815) (synonym = C. glomerata subsp. speciosa)
