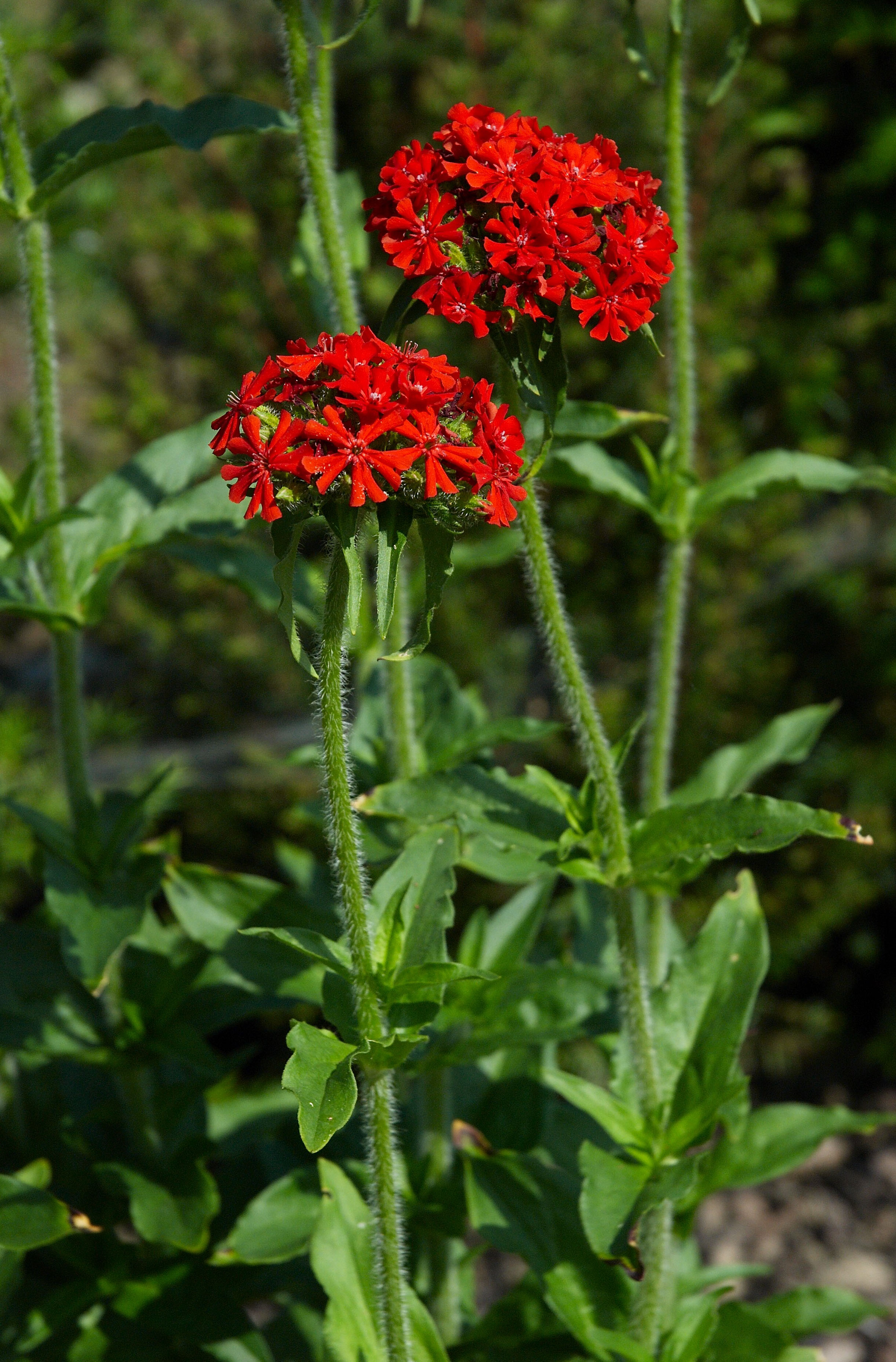

Scientific classification
- Kingdom: Plantae
- Clade: Tracheophytes
- Clade: Angiosperms
- Clade: Eudicots
- Order: Caryophyllales
- Family: Caryophyllaceae
- Genus: Silene
- Species: S. chalcedonica

Binomial name
- Silene chalcedonica (L.) E.H.L.Krause

Synonyms
- Lychnis chalcedonica L.; Lychnis fulgida Moench

= Silene chalcedonica =

Species of flowering plant

Silene chalcedonica (syn. Lychnis chalcedonica), the Maltese-cross or scarlet lychnis, is a species of flowering plant in the family Caryophyllaceae, native to Eurasia. Other common names include flower of Bristol, Jerusalem cross and nonesuch.

It is a popular ornamental plant and has gained the Royal Horticultural Society's Award of Garden Merit.

== Description ==
It is a perennial herbaceous plant growing 35–100 centimetres (14–39 inches) tall with unbranched stems. The simple, broadly lanceolate leaves are produced in opposite pairs. Each leaf ranges between 2–12 cm (1–5 in) long and 1–5 cm (1/2–2 in) across.

The bright red flowers are produced in clusters of 10-50 together. Each flower 1–3 cm (1/2–1 1/4 in) in diameter with a deeply five-lobed corolla, each lobe being further split into two smaller lobes. This forms a general shape similar to that of the Maltese cross to which it owes one of its common names. The fruit is a dry capsule containing numerous seeds.

== Taxonomy ==
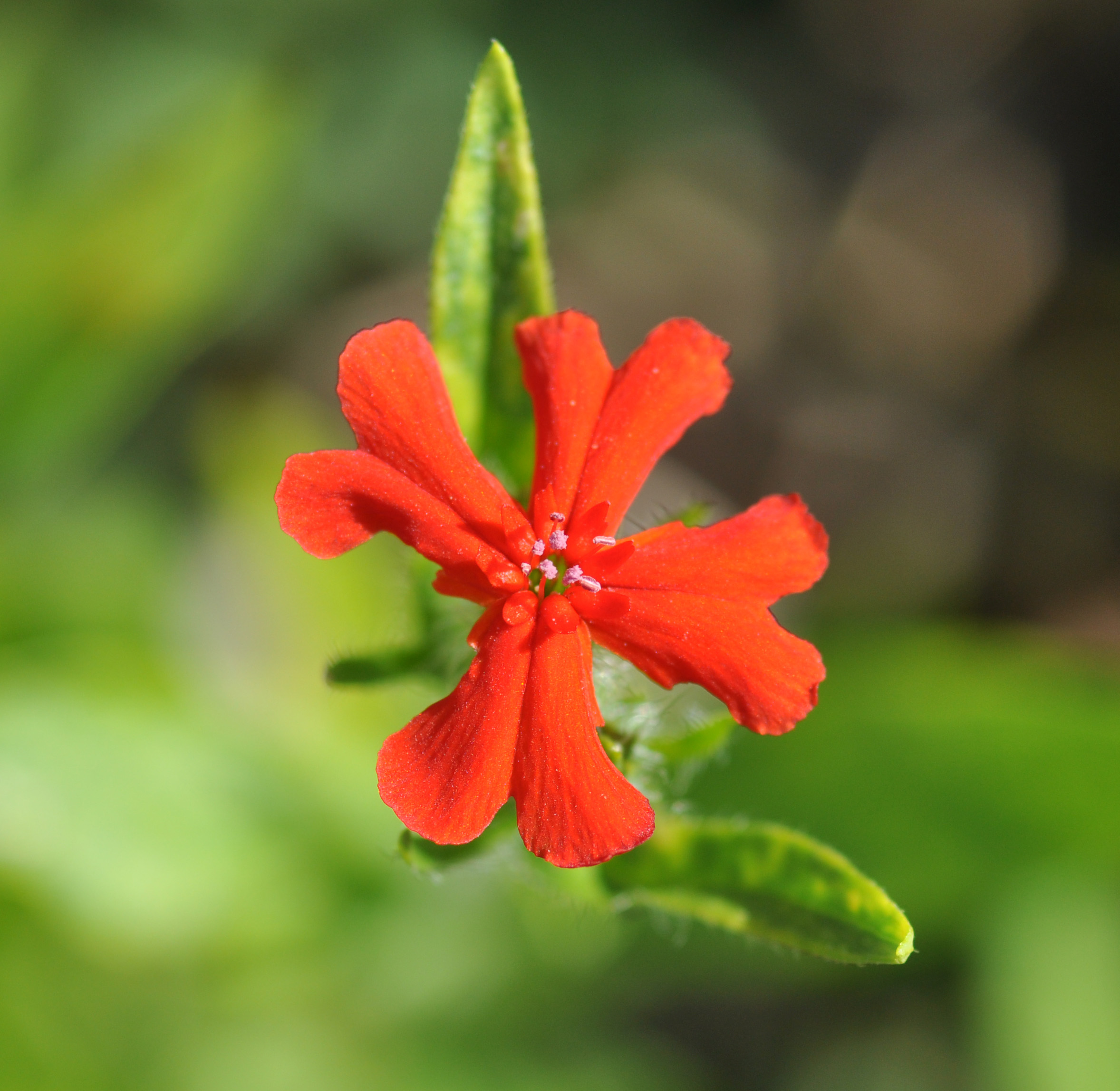
A Maltese cross (left) one of many common names for Silene chalcedonica (right, a four-parted flower, though they typically have five cleft lobes)

This plant was first formally named as Lychnis chalcedonica by Carl Linnaeus in 1753. For purposes of taxonomic stability, the genus name Lychnis was formally rejected in 1994 and the name Silene was conserved. The name Silene chalcedonica was published by Ernst Hans Ludwig Krause in 1901.

The specific epithet chalcedonica refers to the ancient town of Chalcedon in what is now Turkey.

Numerous common names are attached to this plant, including:

- Burning love
- Common rose campion (also used for Silene coronaria)
- Constantinople campion
- Dusky salmon
- Fireball
- Flower of Bristol
- Flower of Constantinople
- Gardener's delight
- Gardener's eye
- Great candlestick
- Jerusalem cross
- Knight's cross
- Maltese cross
- Meadow campion
- Nonesuch
- Red robin
- Scarlet lightning
- Scarlet lychnis
- Tears of Christ

== Distribution and habitat ==
The species is native to central and eastern Russia, Kazakhstan, Mongolia, and northwestern China. It has naturalised in some parts of North America. It can be found along roadsides and other disturbed areas, as well as open woodlands, in the northern United States and Canada.

== Cultivation ==
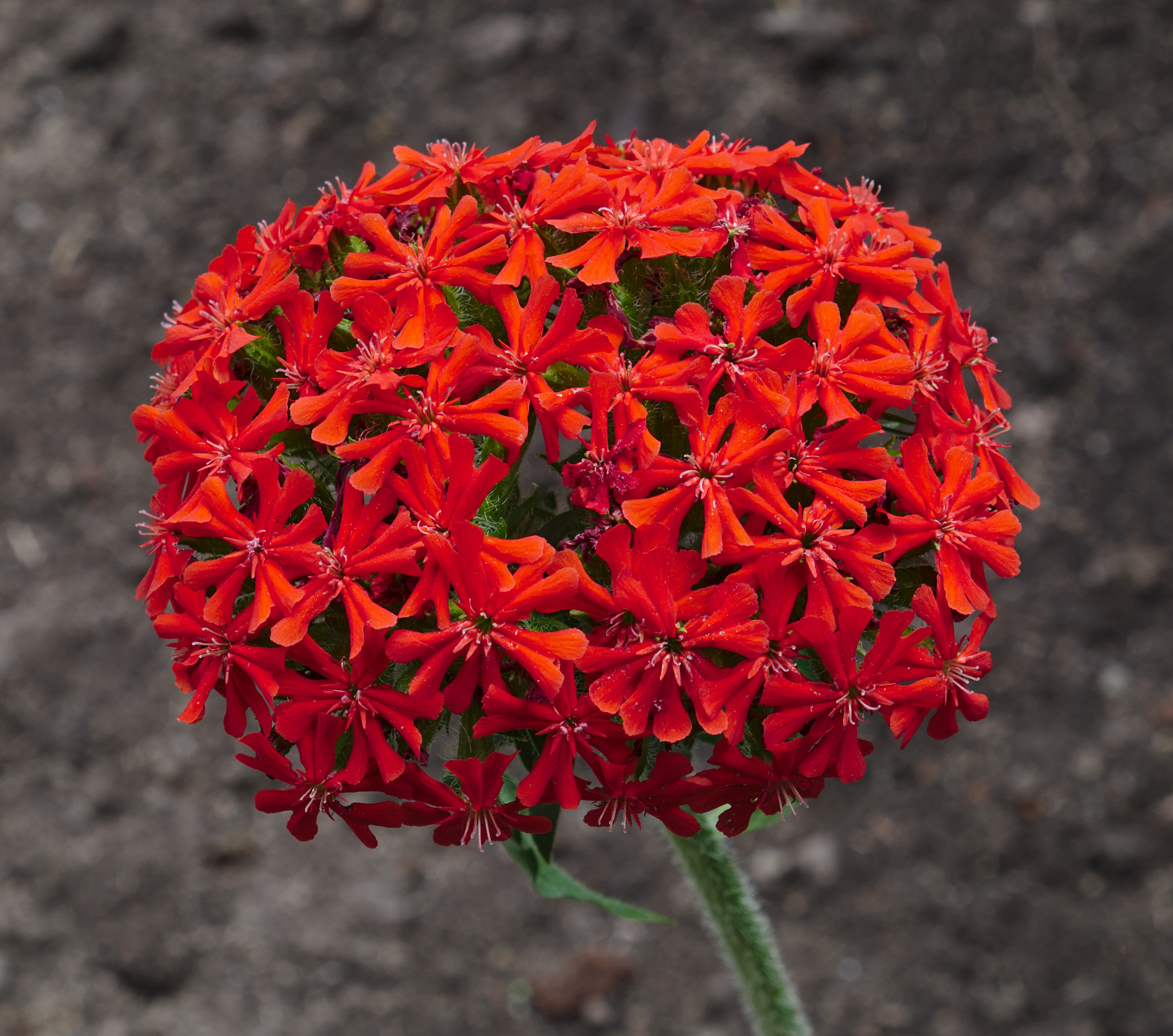
In cultivation

It is a popular ornamental plant in gardens. It has gained the Royal Horticultural Society's Award of Garden Merit. Numerous cultivars have been selected, varying in flower colour from bright red to orange-red, pink or white. It grows best in partial to full sun and in any good well-drained soil, if provided with a constant moisture supply. The flowering period is extended if faded flowers are removed. It is short-lived in poorly drained soil. Double-flowered cultivars are propagated by division.

== In culture ==
It was voted the county flower of Bristol in 2002, following a poll by the wild flora conservation charity Plantlife. Its colour is reflected in the livery and crest of the city's university.
