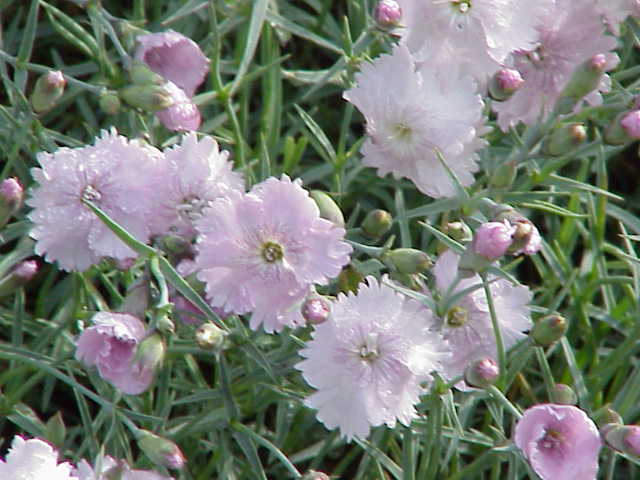

Scientific classification
- Kingdom: Plantae
- Clade: Tracheophytes
- Clade: Angiosperms
- Clade: Eudicots
- Order: Caryophyllales
- Family: Caryophyllaceae
- Genus: Dianthus
- Species: D. gratianopolitanus

Binomial name
- Dianthus gratianopolitanus Vill.

= Dianthus gratianopolitanus =

Cheddar pink

Species of flowering plant

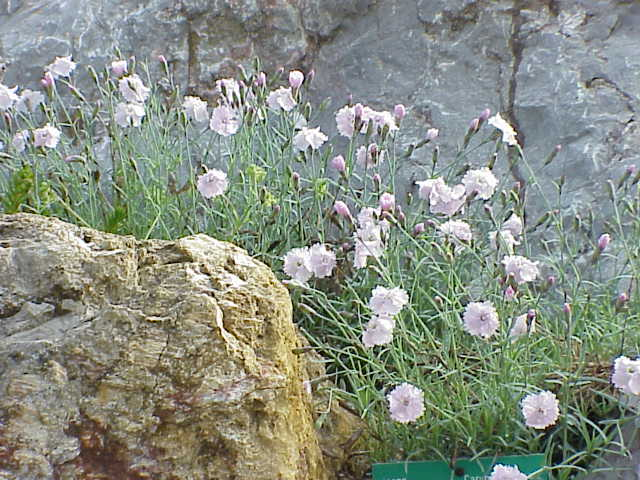
Dianthus gratianopolitanus

Dianthus gratianopolitanus, commonly known as the Cheddar pink or clove pink, is a species of plant in the family Caryophyllaceae. It is a herbaceous perennial, hardy to zones 4–8. It grows to a height of 0.5 to 1 feet, blooming from May to June. Flowers are fragrant and rose pink. Grows best in full sun and has medium water requirements. Overwatering or poor drainage leads to crown rot, and plants do not tolerate wet winter soil conditions.

The specific epithet gratianopolitanus refers to the ancient Roman name Gratianopolis of the modern French city of Grenoble. The common name Cheddar pink refers to the fact that it's native to the Cheddar Gorge in England.

It is native to western and central Europe, from the UK to Ukraine. It became a protected species in the UK in 1975 under the Conservation of Wild Creatures and Wild Plants Act.

== Cultivation ==
Cultivars include 'Feuerhexe' (syn. 'Fire Witch'), 'Grandiflorus' and 'Tiny Rubies'. Dianthus gratianopolitanus has gained the Royal Horticultural Society's Award of Garden Merit.

== See also ==
- Gilliflower

== Sources ==
- Missouri Botanical Garden: Dianthus gratianopolitanus 'Grandiflorus'
