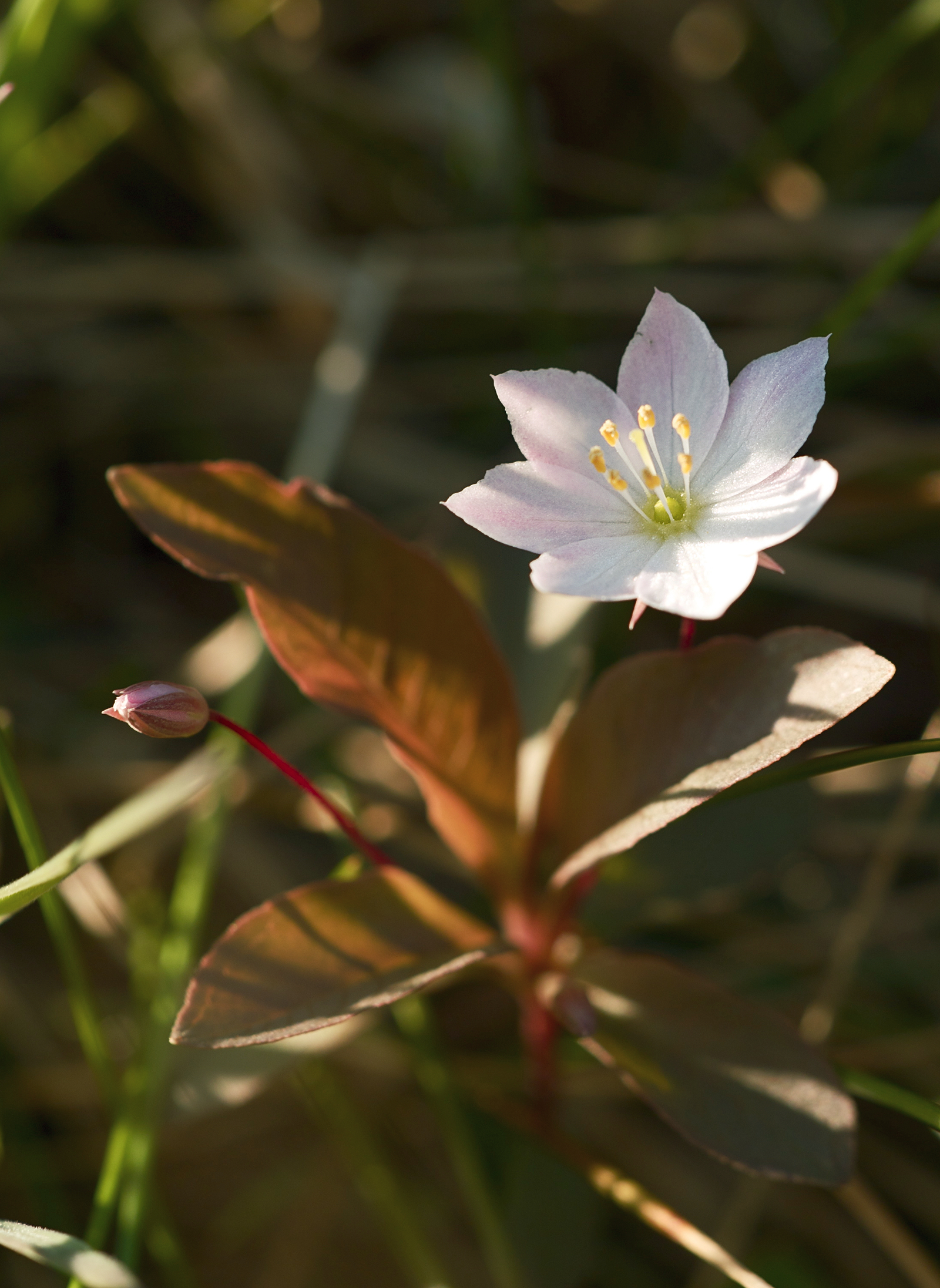

Scientific classification
- Kingdom: Plantae
- Clade: Tracheophytes
- Clade: Angiosperms
- Clade: Eudicots
- Clade: Asterids
- Order: Ericales
- Family: Primulaceae
- Genus: Lysimachia
- Species: L. europaea

Binomial name
- Lysimachia europaea L. U.Manns & Anderb.

= Lysimachia europaea =

Species of flowering plant

Lysimachia europaea (formerly known as Trientalis europaea) is a flowering plant in the primrose family Primulaceae, called by the common name chickweed-wintergreen or arctic starflower. It is a small herbaceous perennial plant with one or more whorls of leaves on a single slender erect stem. It is about 10 cm, 3.9 in high. The broad lanceolate leaves are pale green but take on a copper hue in late summer. The solitary white flowers (1–2 cm, 0.39–0.79 in diameter, usually with 6–8 petals) are reminiscent of small wood anemones and appear in midsummer. The fruits are globular, dry capsules, but are seldom produced.

Lysimachia europaea occurs throughout boreal regions of Europe and Asia, but is absent from eastern North America, but can be found in the northwestern parts of the U.S. and parts of Canada. where it is largely replaced by Lysimachia borealis in corresponding habitats.

This is a woodland indicator species, and in Scotland it is found on acid, organic soils, mainly in pine, birch and oak woodland and moorland, which has supported woodland in the past, and also sometimes on heaths. The plant is a good competitor, rarely reproducing by seed but a poor colonist forming extensive clonal populations interconnected by rhizomes during the growing season. The rhizomes and above-ground parts are deciduous, the plant forming overwintering tubers. The range of the plant is changing little in Scotland, but it has declined in northern England due to woodland clearance and moor burning; its precise distribution on the North York Moors is now better known.

The flower is the provincial flower of the Värmland province in Sweden and the "county flower" of Nairn in northern Scotland.

Trientalis europaea is now widely referenced in botanical literature under the name Lysimachia europaea.
