= Gentiana gracilis =

Gentiana gracilis may refer to several taxon synonyms of flowering plant species:

- Gentiana gracilis Nees (1818), synonym of Gentianella obtusifolia (F.W.Schmidt) Holub
- Gentiana gracilis Kunth (1819), nom. illeg. homonym. post., synonym of Gentianella gracilis (Raf.) Fabris
- Gentiana gracilis Cham. & Schltdl. (1826), synonym of Gentianella amarella subsp. amarella
