= Hercampuri =

Medicinal plant in Peru

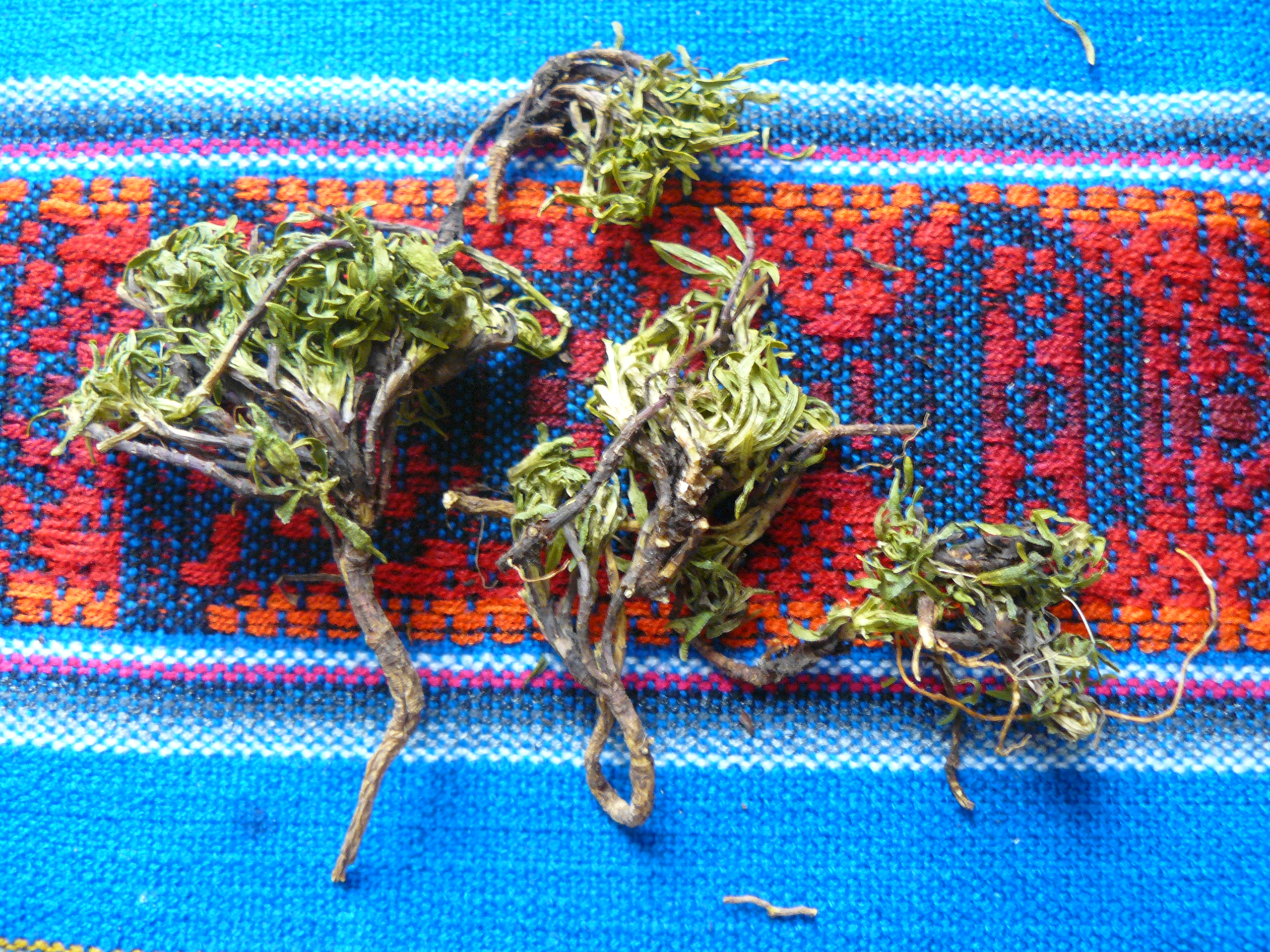
Gentianella alborosea

Hercampuri is a name applied to two species of Gentianella – Gentianella nitida and Gentianella alborosea. It has been used in Peruvian folk medicine since before the time of the Incas. These small shrubs are native to the high Andes of Peru. The Junin Province is a region of Peru that grows hercampuri.

== Traditional use ==
The whole plant is used as an infusion. The roots are thin and yellow in color and the infusion of hercampuri also has a yellow color.

== Chemical constituents ==
The infusion of hercampuri is one of the most bitter flavors of all herbs. The beneficial compounds that give hercampuri its unique taste contribute to the bitterness of the infusion. Chemical constituents isolated from Gentianella nitida include amaronitidin and nitiol.
