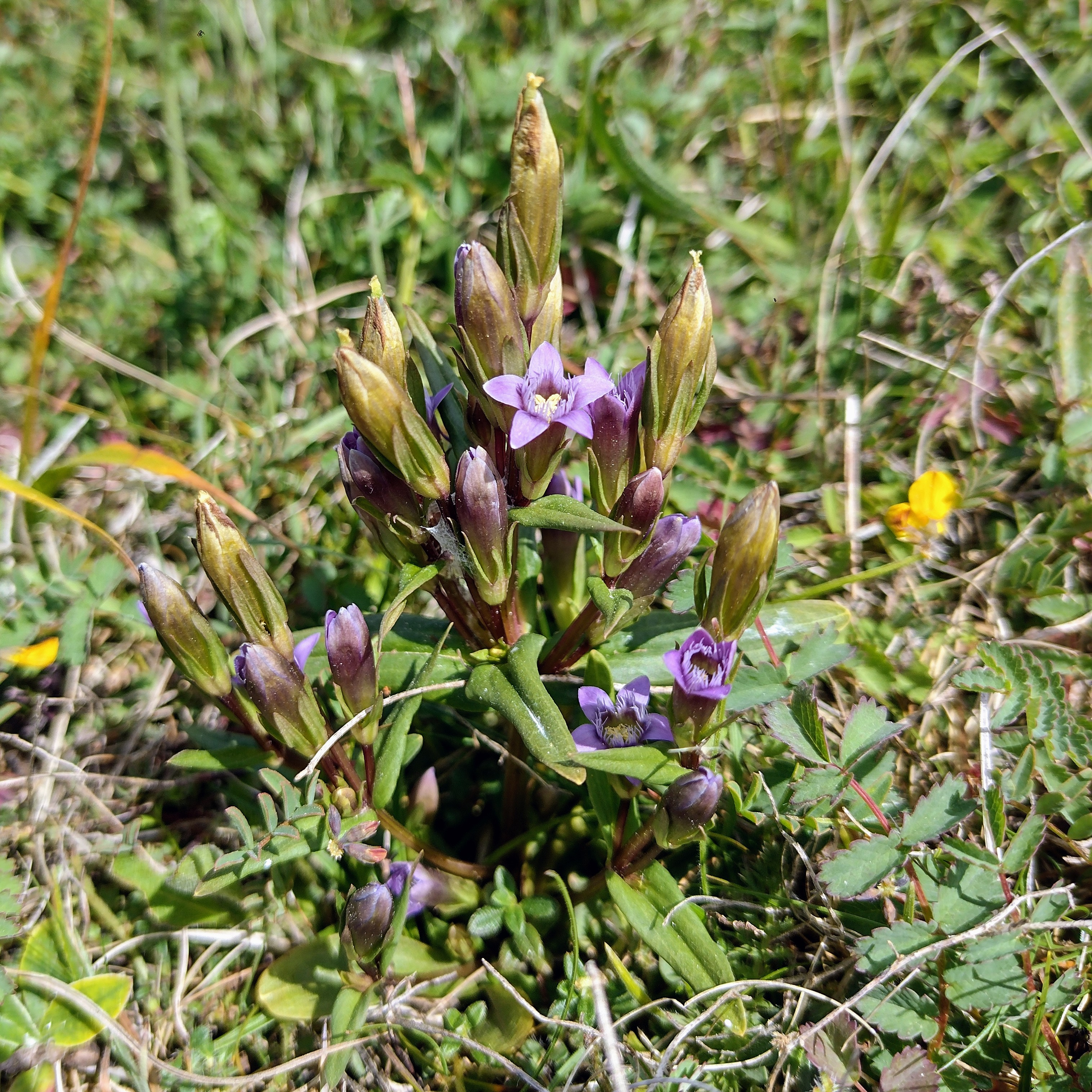

Conservation status
- Data Deficient (IUCN 3.1)

Scientific classification
- Kingdom: Plantae
- Clade: Tracheophytes
- Clade: Angiosperms
- Clade: Eudicots
- Clade: Asterids
- Order: Gentianales
- Family: Gentianaceae
- Genus: Gentianella
- Species: G. anglica

Binomial name
- Gentianella anglica (Pugsley) E.F.Warb.

= Gentianella anglica =

Species of flowering plant

Gentianella anglica, the early gentian, is a species of flowering plant in the genus Gentianella, native to Great Britain. Gentianella anglica is endemic to Great Britain and its centre of distribution is in Dorset, Wiltshire, and the Isle of Wight.

== Description ==
Gentianella anglica is an annual species, similar in appearance to felwort (Gentianella amarella), but much shorter. It is a hairless plant with pairs of narrow lanceolate leaves and spikes of long-stalked, purplish, five-petalled flowers with the usually four calyx teeth unequal in size. It flowers from May to June, considerably earlier than felwort.

== Distribution and habitat ==
This gentian is endemic to Great Britain. It has been known from as far north as Yorkshire, but now it is mainly found on the chalk downs of Dorset, Wiltshire and the Isle of Wight. Other locations where it grows include Gloucestershire, Cornwall, the Dorset coast, and limestone quarries at Grimsthorpe, Lincolnshire. It also occurs on the coastal grassland at Stackpole in West Wales, a long way from its southern England locations. It favours moderately-closely grazed pasture, preferably grazed by cattle kept extensively.

== Status ==
Population sizes vary greatly from year to year; in Wiltshire and Dorset, some sites have in some years had hundreds of thousands of plants, and in other years, few or none. The seeds can remain viable in the soil for many years. In general, populations are in decline as the old chalk grassland is ploughed up, or fertilised, or remains ungrazed with the production of ranker vegetation, as it cannot compete with more vigorous species. The taxonomy of the plant is uncertain, with some people regarding it as part of a Gentianella amarella species group, so the International Union for Conservation of Nature has assessed its conservation status as data deficient.
