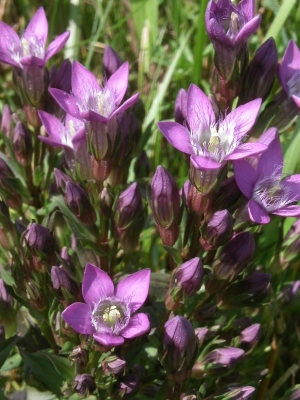

Scientific classification
- Kingdom: Plantae
- Clade: Tracheophytes
- Clade: Angiosperms
- Clade: Eudicots
- Clade: Asterids
- Order: Gentianales
- Family: Gentianaceae
- Genus: Gentianella
- Species: G. praecox

Binomial name
- Gentianella praecox (A.Kern. & Jos.Kern.) E. Mayer

= Gentianella praecox =

Species of plant

Gentianella praecox, the Bohemian gentian, is a flowering plant species belonging to the genus Gentianella in the family Gentianaceae. Its distribution is limited to the territory of the Bohemian Massif.

== Description ==
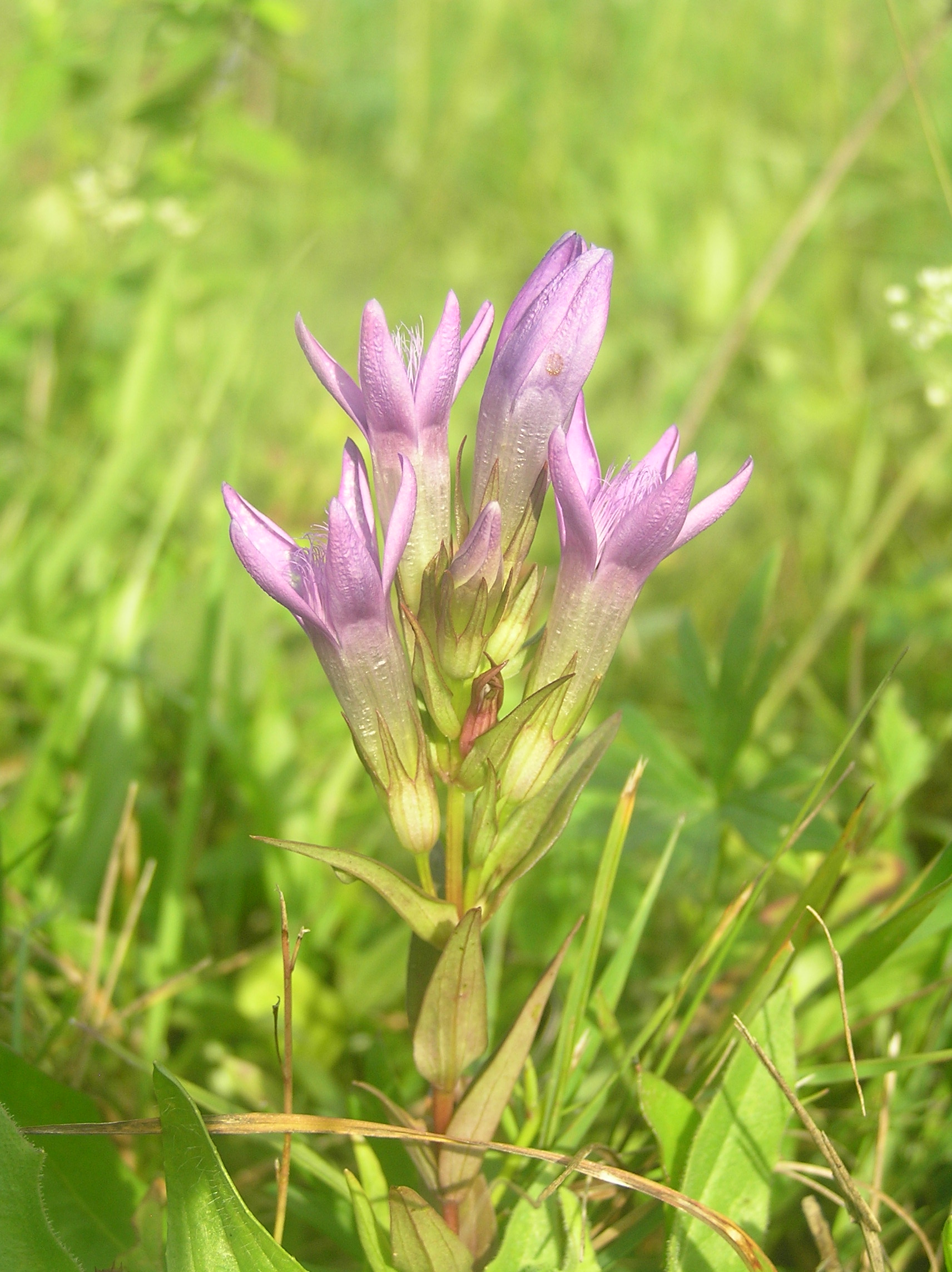
Gentianella praecox subsp. bohemica flower from the side, details of calyx and crown

Gentianella praecox is a biennial herb with a direct, simple stem, which more often branches at the base. It consists of 4–16 internodes (stem articles) of about the same length. Basal leaves measure 4.5 cm, which disappear with flowering. In the first year after germination the plant creates a sterile leafy rosette, which flowers in the second year. The size of the plant is very variable according to season and habitat, varying from 5 to 35 cm up to a height of 75 cm.

Flowers are composed from the calyx and the crown and contain five petals (pentamerous). The five often carmine-red tinged Sepals are fused at the bottom to form an unfurled chalice tube. The number of flowers is usually 2–50, exceptionally, up to 360. Gentianella praecox usually blooms from late August to early October. As with other gentianellas, there are summer flowering (aestival) and autumn flowering (autumnal) populations, without taxonomic significance.

The number of chromosomes is 2n = 36.

Gentianella praecox shares characteristics with Gentianella germanica and Gentianella austriaca, but can be distinguished by the often carmine-red veined calyx, the papillary and strongly retroverted calyxes, the clearly formed and full-rimmed wings of the calyx tube and the more or less U- or V-shaped calyxes.

== Distribution, habitat ==
Gentianella praecox subsp. bohemica is endemic to the Bohemian massif in central Europe. Historically, it extended to the German part of the Šumava Mountains, the northern part of Austria and the southern part of Poland, but the center of its expansion remains the Czech Republic. According to a field study between 2000 and 2013 there were 73 known localities in the Czech Republic where Gentianella praecox subsp. bohemica had been mapped at least once.

Gentianella praecox is very rare. There are only a few sites left and thus it is threatened with extinction throughout its range. Only rediscovered in Bavaria in 1988 at 7 residual sites in the Bavarian Forest at altitudes between 700 and 890 meters, mapped in 1989 and 1990, the number of sites had decreased to three by 2010.

== Taxonomy ==
In 1888 Anton Joseph Kerner and Josef Kerner first described it under the basionym Gentiana praecox. In 1968, Ernest Mayer presented the Bohemian gentian as Gentianella praecox (A.Kern.& Jos.Kern.) E.Mayer in Bioloski Vestnik. Volume 16, 1968, p., 26 in the genus Gentianella. This older name, which belongs to the aestival breed, has priority compared to the common name Gentianella bohemica, which Vladimír Skalický called it in 1968; This belongs to the autumnal breed, which no longer has any taxonomic value. Other synonyms for Gentianella praecox are Gentianella gabretae (Skalický), simultaneously described with G. bohemica as an aesthetic race, and Gentianella praecox subsp. bohemica (Skalický) Holub.
