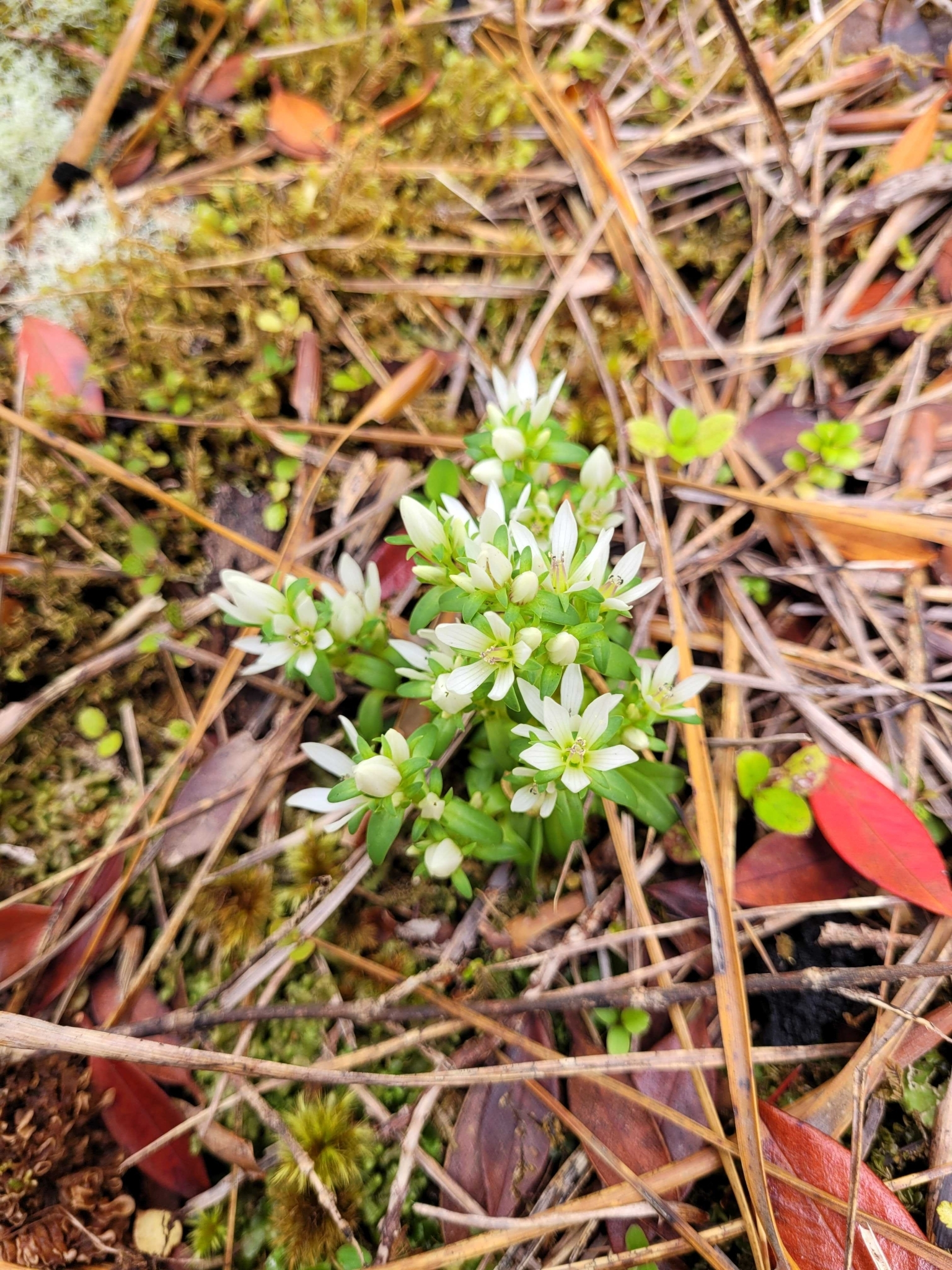
- Observed on Adams Island.

Conservation status
- Naturally Uncommon (NZ TCS)

Scientific classification
- Kingdom: Plantae
- Clade: Tracheophytes
- Clade: Angiosperms
- Clade: Eudicots
- Clade: Asterids
- Order: Gentianales
- Family: Gentianaceae
- Genus: Gentianella
- Species: G. cerina

Binomial name
- Gentianella cerina Hook.f. T.N.Ho & S.W.Liu

Synonyms
- Chionogentias cerina (Hook.f.) L.G.Adams; Gentiana campbellii Hombr. & Jacquinot ex Decne. Gentiana cerina Hook.f.

= Gentianella cerina =

Species of flowering plant in New Zealand

Gentianella cerina, commonly known as Auckland Island gentian, is a plant species in the Gentianaceae family, endemic to the Auckland Islands of New Zealand.

== Description ==
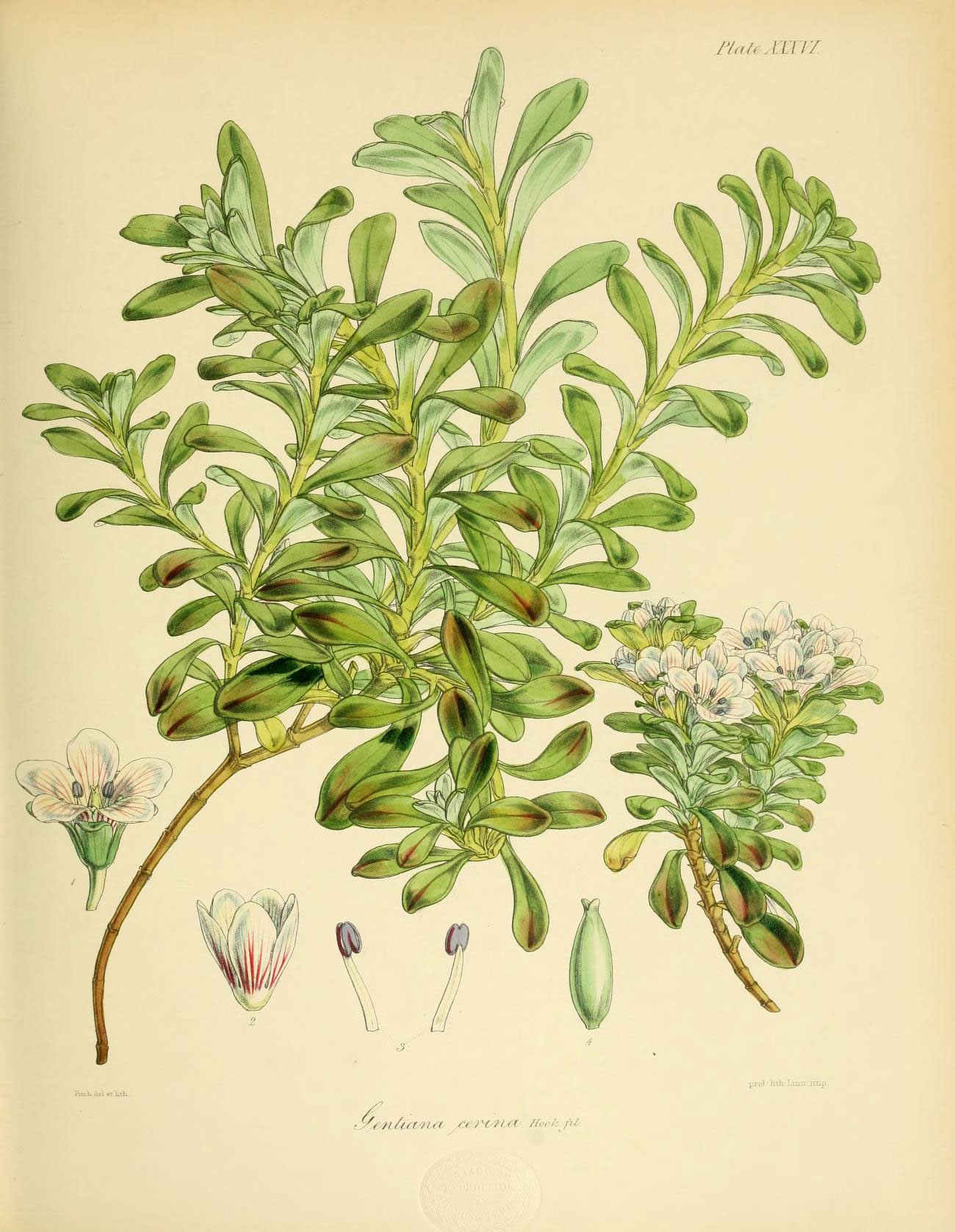
Gentianella cerina illustration from the original description.

Gentianella cerina has a thick trunk (caudex) which may be unbranched or branched and of a height from 110–200 mm. There are 3–12 flowering stems per plant (1.1–3.1 mm in diameter) and these may be terminal or lateral. The lateral flowering stems spread horizontally with the ends growing upwards (i.e., they are decumbent). The leaves are elliptic, 36.6–53.1 by 8.4–12.6 mm) and are flat, with thickened margins. The leaf apex is rounded and the distinct petiole is 11–13 mm by 4.7–6.3 mm. Leaves on flowering stems are the same but smaller. There are 15 to more than 100 flowers per plant, which are 9.9–14.1 mm long. The calyx is 9.3–12.2 mm long and there are hairs at calyx–corolla fusion line. The corolla is 8.4–11.8 mm long, and white or tinted red to purple, with colourless or purple veins. The tube is 2.1–4.4 mm long and the lobes are 6.3–8.8 by 3.8–5.0 mm. The pollen is yellow and the stigma is purple or colourless. There are 13–37 ovules per ovary, and the capsule is 6.5–12 mm long. It flowers from December to April.

== Taxonomy ==
It was first described in 1844 by Joseph Dalton Hooker as Gentiana cerina. Its currently accepted name is Gentianella cerina, having been assigned to the genus Gentianella by the authors, Ho and Liu in 1993.

== Conservation status ==
In both 2009 and 2012 it was deemed to be "At Risk - Naturally Uncommon" under the New Zealand Threat Classification System, and this classification was reaffirmed in 2018, due to the species being an island endemic and having a restricted range.
