= Gentianella hypericoides =

Conservation status
- Vulnerable (IUCN 3.1)

Scientific classification
- Kingdom: Plantae
- Clade: Tracheophytes
- Clade: Angiosperms
- Clade: Eudicots
- Clade: Asterids
- Order: Gentianales
- Family: Gentianaceae
- Genus: Gentianella
- Species: G. hypericoides

Binomial name
- Gentianella hypericoides (Gilg) Fabris

Synonyms
- Gentiana hypericoides Gilg; Gentianella crassulifolia var. hypericoides (Gilg) T.N.Ho

Species of flowering plant

Gentianella hypericoides is a species of flowering plant in the family Gentianaceae. It is endemic to Ecuador. Its natural habitat is subtropical or tropical high-altitude shrubland.
