= Gentianella hyssopifolia =

Conservation status
- Vulnerable (IUCN 3.1)

Scientific classification
- Kingdom: Plantae
- Clade: Tracheophytes
- Clade: Angiosperms
- Clade: Eudicots
- Clade: Asterids
- Order: Gentianales
- Family: Gentianaceae
- Genus: Gentianella
- Species: G. hyssopifolia

Binomial name
- Gentianella hyssopifolia (Kunth) Fabris

Species of flowering plant

Gentianella hyssopifolia is a species of plant in the Gentianaceae family. It is endemic to Ecuador. Its natural habitats are subtropical or tropical high-altitude shrubland and subtropical or tropical high-altitude grassland.

The Latin word hyssopifolia (which also occurs in several other plant names, including that of cuphea hyssopifolia) means "hyssop-leafed".
