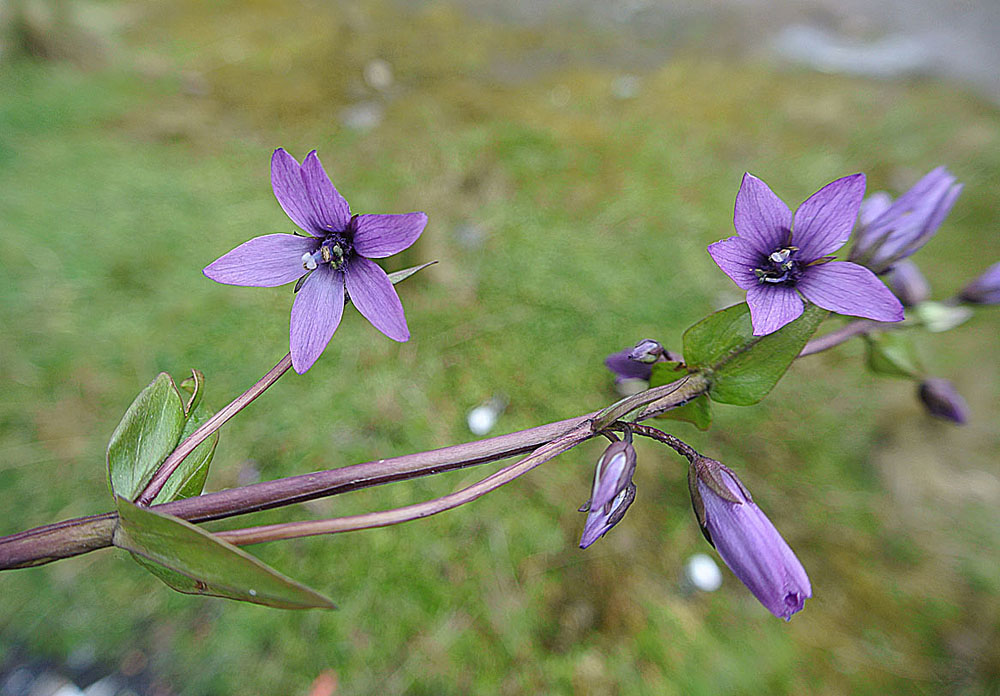
- Photo from near Papallacta Pass, east of Quito.

Conservation status
- Endangered (IUCN 3.1)

Scientific classification
- Kingdom: Plantae
- Clade: Tracheophytes
- Clade: Angiosperms
- Clade: Eudicots
- Clade: Asterids
- Order: Gentianales
- Family: Gentianaceae
- Genus: Gentianella
- Species: G. jamesonii

Binomial name
- Gentianella jamesonii (Hook.) Fabris

Synonyms
- Gentiana arcuata Griseb.; Gentiana inflata Griseb.; Gentiana jamesonii Hook.; Gentiana pendula Griseb.

= Gentianella jamesonii =

Species of flowering plant

Gentianella jamesonii is a species of flowering plant in the Gentianaceae family. It is an annual endemic to Pichincha Province of Ecuador. Its natural habitat is subtropical or tropical high-elevation shrubland.

The species was first described as Gentiana jamesonii by William Jackson Hooker in 1837. In 1960 Humberto Antonio Fabris placed the species in genus Gentianella as Gentianella jamesonii.
