= Gentianella nitida =

Conservation status
- Near Threatened (IUCN 3.1)

Scientific classification
- Kingdom: Plantae
- Clade: Tracheophytes
- Clade: Angiosperms
- Clade: Eudicots
- Clade: Asterids
- Order: Gentianales
- Family: Gentianaceae
- Genus: Gentianella
- Species: G. nitida

Binomial name
- Gentianella nitida (Griseb.) Fabris

Synonyms
- Gentiana nitida Griseb.

Species of flowering plant

Gentianella nitida is a species of plant in the Gentianaceae family. It is one of two types of hercampuri, which is traditionally used in herbal medicine as an infusion, the other type of hercampuri being Gentianella alborosea. Gentianella nitida has been used in Peruvian folk medicine since before the time of the Incas. These small shrubs are native to the high Andes of Peru. The Junin Province is a region of Peru that grows hercampuri.

== Traditional use ==
The whole plant is used as an infusion. The roots are thin and yellow in color and the infusion of hercampuri also has a yellow color. Traditional uses of hercampuri include:

- digestive
- treatment of hepatitis
- treatment of varicose veins
- reduction of blood cholesterol
- treatment of hypertension

== Chemical constituents ==
The infusion of hercampuri is one of the most bitter flavors of all herbs. The chemical compounds that give hercampuri its unique taste contribute to the bitterness of the infusion. Chemical constituents isolated from Gentianella nitida include amaronitidin and nitiol.
