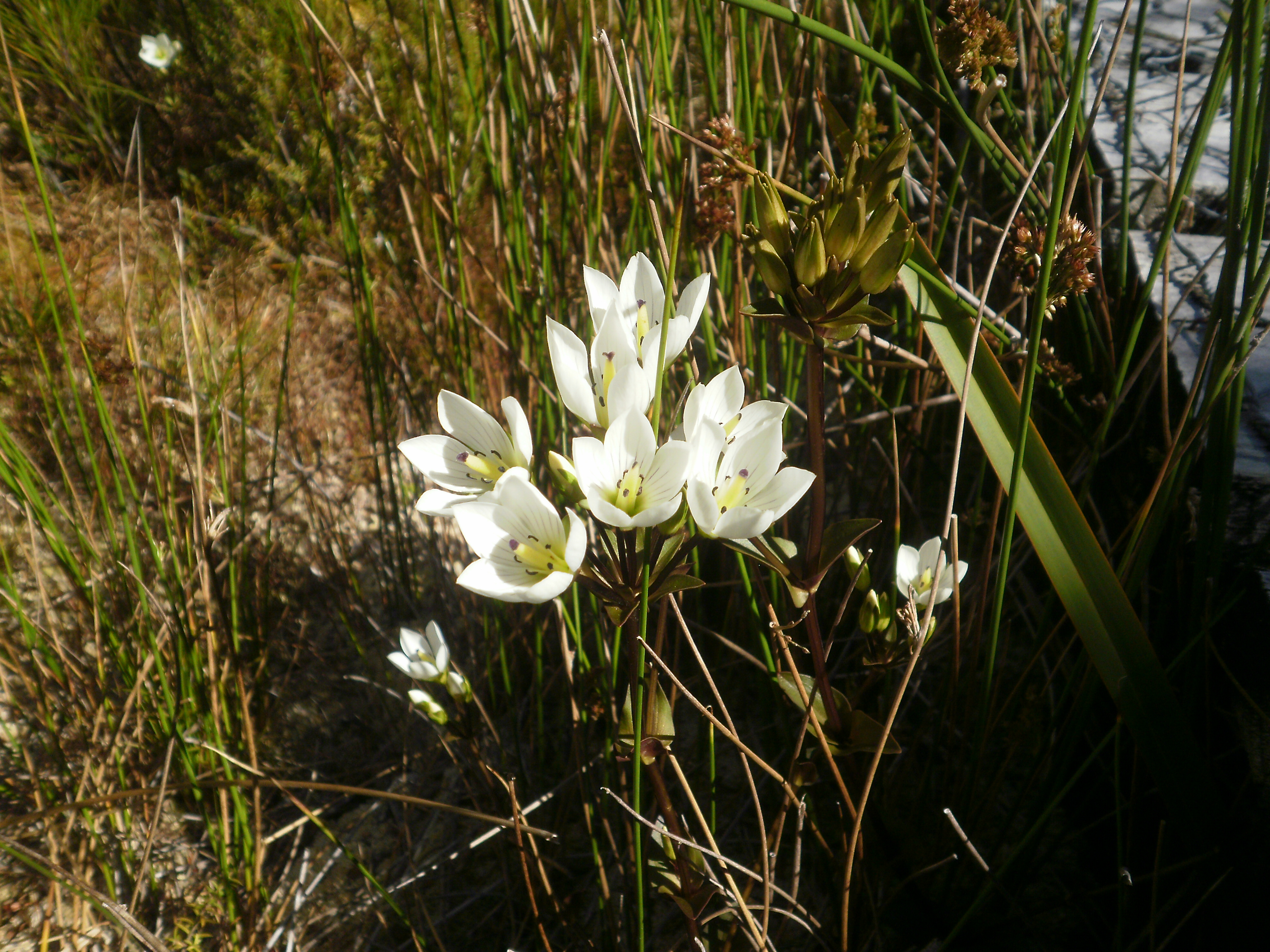

Scientific classification
- Kingdom: Plantae
- Clade: Tracheophytes
- Clade: Angiosperms
- Clade: Eudicots
- Clade: Asterids
- Order: Gentianales
- Family: Gentianaceae
- Genus: Gentianella
- Species: G. bellidifolia

Binomial name
- Gentianella bellidifolia Hook.f.

= Gentianella bellidifolia =

Species of plant

Gentianella bellidifolia is a species of the genus Gentianella that is native to New Zealand.

G. bellidifolia is found in alpine areas of both the North and South Island.

== Feature ==
Plants polycarpic, height in flower 80–370 mm. Root 1.2–6.0 mm diameter at stem base. Caudex unbranched or branched, 15–90 mm long, stolons absent. Flowering stems lateral only, 1–13 per plant, largest flowering stem 1.0–3.2 mm diameter, green, tinted purple-black, or bronze, lateral flowering stems erect or decumbent, stem leaves 2–4 pairs per stem, lowest pedicels from halfway up flowering stem or near apex of flowering stem
