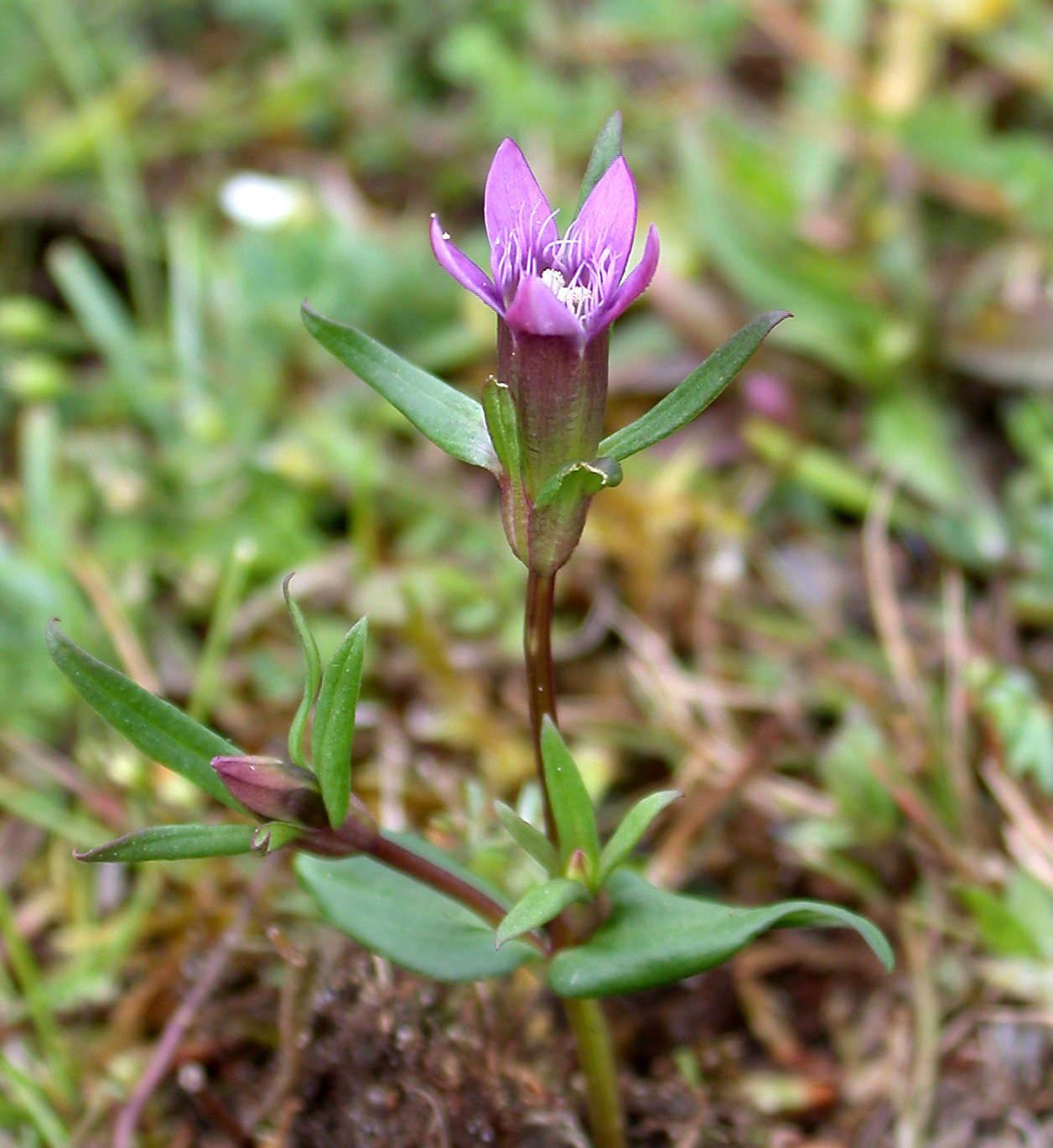

Scientific classification
- Kingdom: Plantae
- Clade: Tracheophytes
- Clade: Angiosperms
- Clade: Eudicots
- Clade: Asterids
- Order: Gentianales
- Family: Gentianaceae
- Genus: Gentianella
- Species: G. uliginosa

Binomial name
- Gentianella uliginosa (Willd.) Börner

= Gentianella uliginosa =

Species of flowering plant

Gentianella uliginosa is a species of flowering plant belonging to the family Gentianaceae.

It is native to Europe.
