= Gentianella fuscicaulis =

Conservation status
- Endangered (IUCN 3.1)

Scientific classification
- Kingdom: Plantae
- Clade: Tracheophytes
- Clade: Angiosperms
- Clade: Eudicots
- Clade: Asterids
- Order: Gentianales
- Family: Gentianaceae
- Genus: Gentianella
- Species: G. fuscicaulis

Binomial name
- Gentianella fuscicaulis Fabris

Species of plant

Gentianella fuscicaulis is a species of plant in the Gentianaceae family. It is endemic to Ecuador. Its natural habitats are subtropical or tropical high-elevation shrubland and subtropical or tropical high-elevation grassland.
