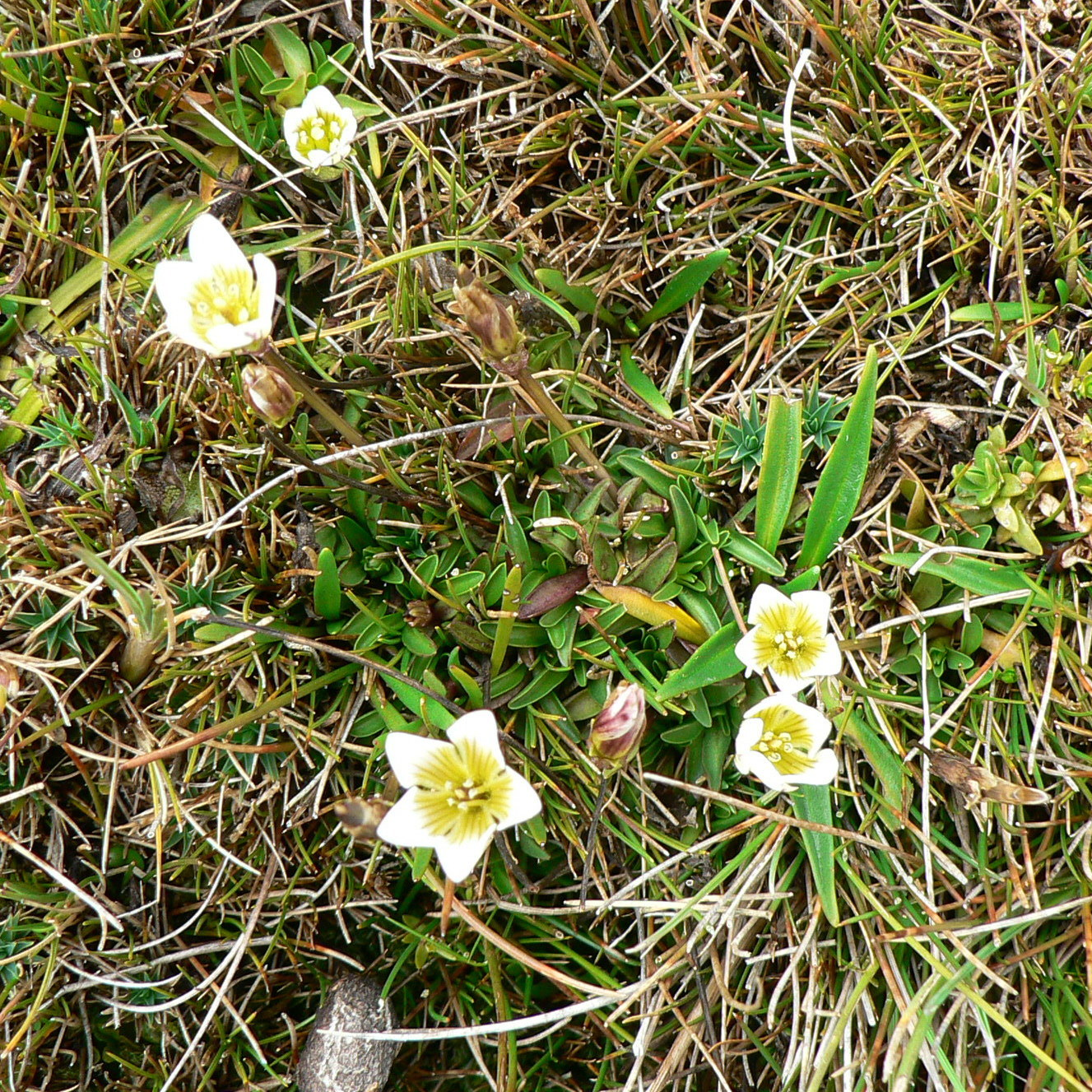

Conservation status
- Least Concern (IUCN 3.1)

Scientific classification
- Kingdom: Plantae
- Clade: Tracheophytes
- Clade: Angiosperms
- Clade: Eudicots
- Clade: Asterids
- Order: Gentianales
- Family: Gentianaceae
- Genus: Gentianella
- Species: G. limoselloides

Binomial name
- Gentianella limoselloides (Kunth) Fabris

Synonyms
- Gentiana limoselloides Kunth

= Gentianella limoselloides =

Species of flowering plant

Gentianella limoselloides is a species of plant in the family Gentianaceae. It is endemic to Ecuador. Its natural habitat is subtropical or tropical high-altitude grassland.
