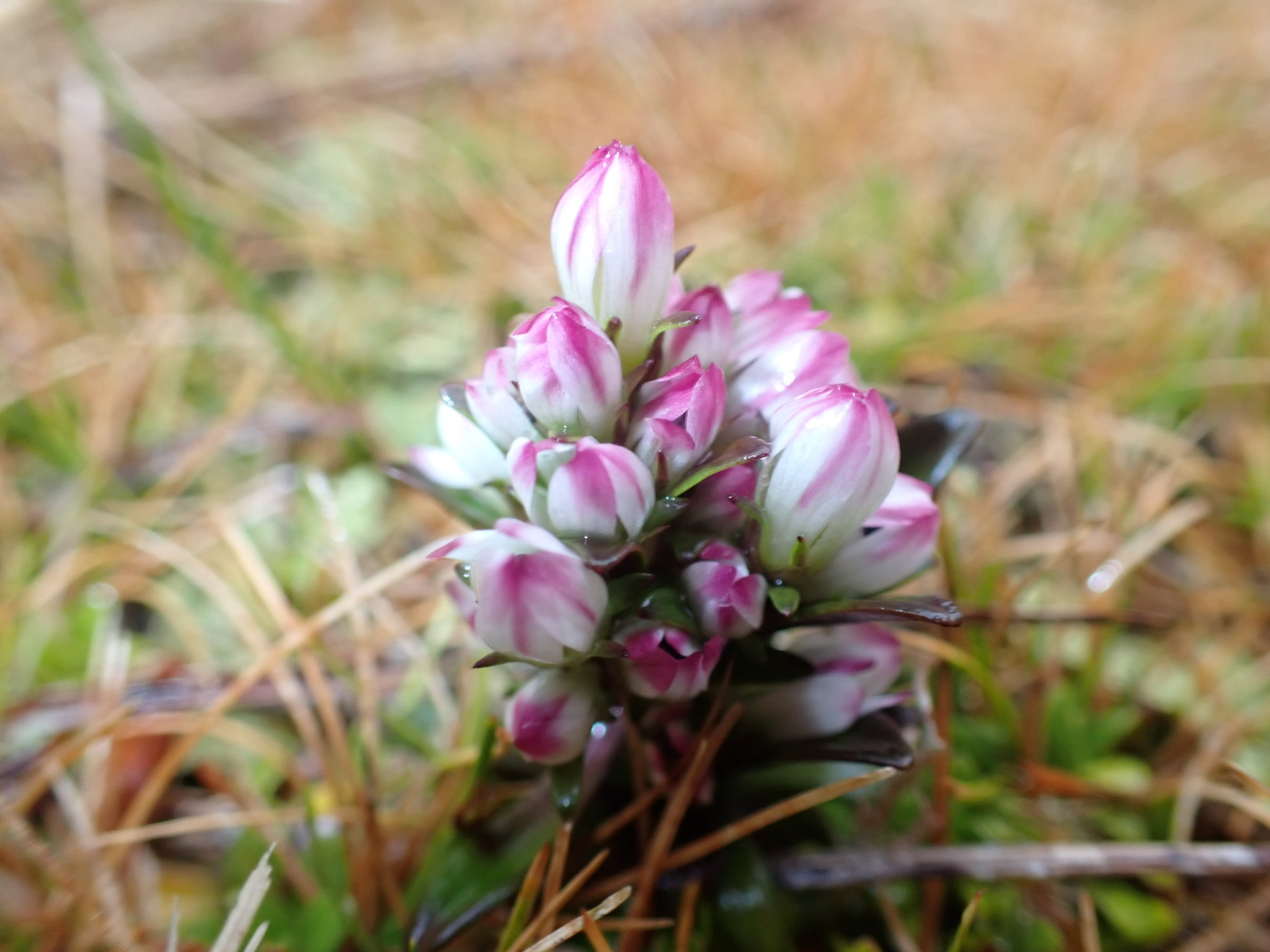
- A Gentianella antarctica in flower

Conservation status
- Naturally Uncommon (NZ TCS)

Scientific classification
- Kingdom: Plantae
- Clade: Embryophytes
- Clade: Tracheophytes
- Clade: Angiosperms
- Clade: Eudicots
- Clade: Asterids
- Order: Gentianales
- Family: Gentianaceae
- Genus: Gentianella
- Species: G. antarctica

Binomial name
- Gentianella antarctica (Kirk) T.N.Ho & S.W.Liu

Synonyms
- List: Chionogentias antarctica (Kirk) L.G.Adams; Gentiana antarctica Kirk; Oreophylax antarcticus (Kirk) Á.Löve; Gentiana antarctica var. imbricata Kirk; Gentiana concinna var. elongata Hook.f.; Gentiana concinna var. robusta Hook.f.

= Gentianella antarctica =

Species of flowering plant

Gentianella antarctica is a species of giant herb from Campbell Island, New Zealand, where it is endemic.

== Description ==
Gentianella antarctica is biennial flower.

== Range and habitat ==
Gentianella antarctica is known exclusively from Campbell Island.
