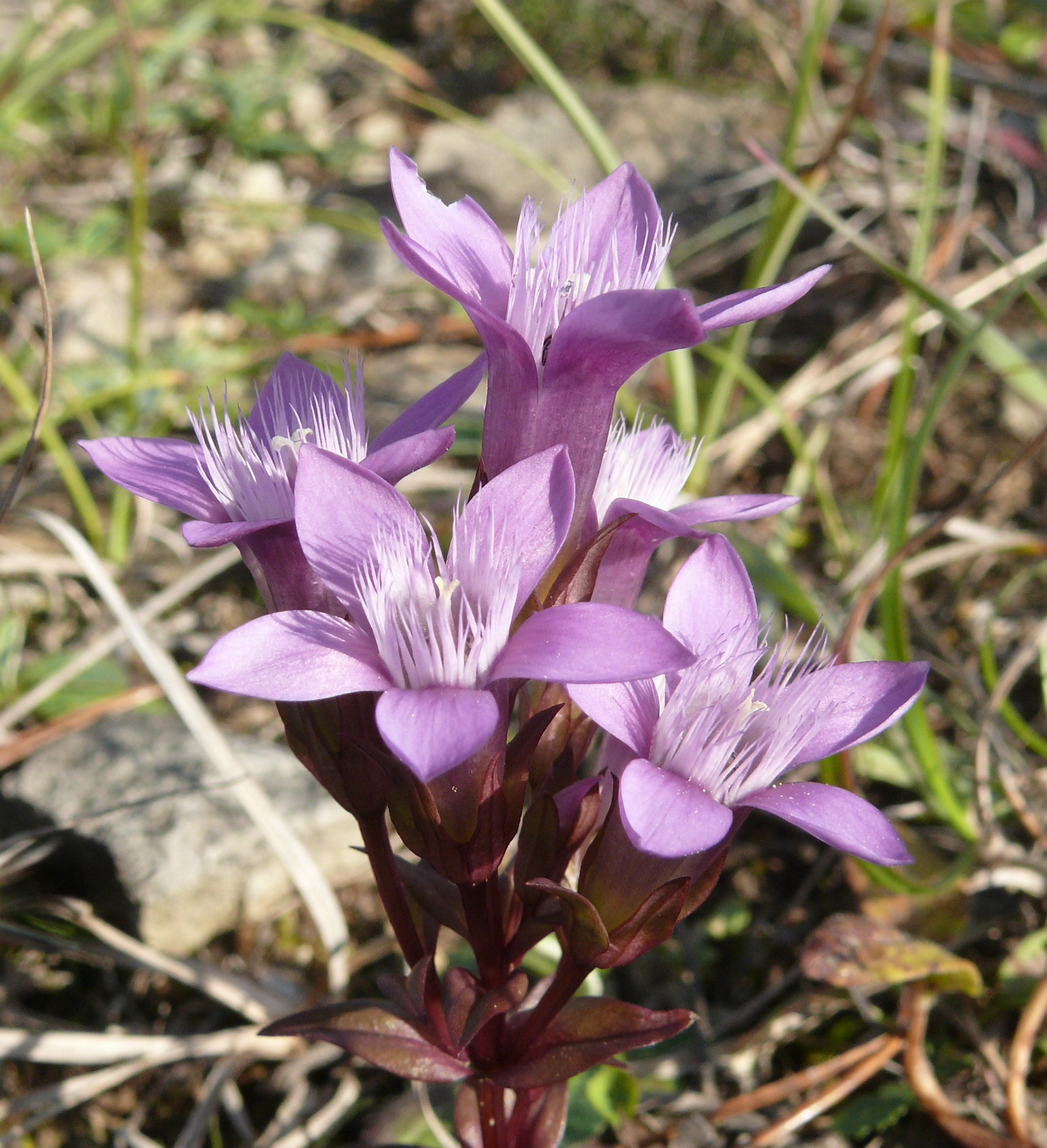
- In the Tauber valley, Germany

Scientific classification
- Kingdom: Plantae
- Clade: Tracheophytes
- Clade: Angiosperms
- Clade: Eudicots
- Clade: Asterids
- Order: Gentianales
- Family: Gentianaceae
- Genus: Gentianella
- Species: G. germanica

Binomial name
- Gentianella germanica (Willd.) Börner

Subspecies
- G. g. subsp. germanica; G. g. subsp. saxonica

Synonyms
- List: Eyrythalia germanica; Gentiana germanica; Gentiana polymorpha subsp. solstitialis; Gentiana solstitialis; Gentianella germanica subsp. solstitialis; Gentianella solstitialis; Opsanthe germanica

= Gentianella germanica =

Plant species in the gentian family

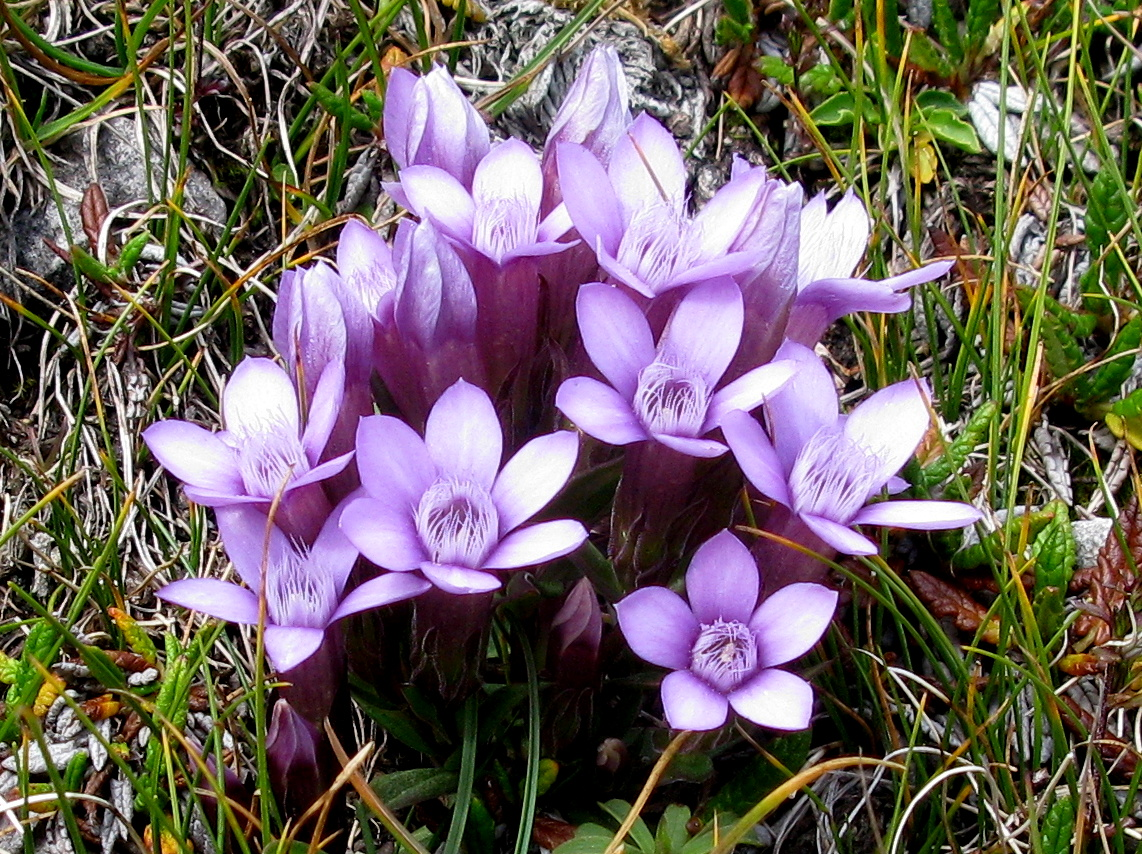
Gentianella germanica - Dolomites

Gentianella germanica, commonly known as German gentian, is a species of dwarf gentian from Europe. It grows primarily in grasslands with calcareous soils in primarily in Central Europe, northern France, and the Low Countries, but with a small population in the United Kingdom. In the UK it is also known as the Chiltern gentian and it grows in the Chiltern Hills of southern England. It is a small, usually biennial plant with large five petaled red-violet flowers.

== Description ==
German gentian is an annual or biennial species of plant. Its stems can be 5 to 40 centimeters (2 to 16 in) in height and are branched or unbranched, but often has very few branches. When a plant grows as an annual its measurements are all much smaller.

When growing as a biennial the plant will grow a rosette of basal leaves during the first year. In the second year the stems grow and usually the basal leaves will have withered by the time the plant begins to flower. The deep green leaves on the stems are attached in pairs to opposite sides and are wide as the base and tapper to a sharp point. Their shape can be ovate, shaped like and egg, ovate-lanceolate, shaped somewhat like an egg but also like the head of a spear, or ovate-triangular.

The flowers grow from the leaf axils, the angle between the leaf and the stem, with the flower at the end of each branch opening first. The flower are usually reddish-violet in color, though on occasion white flowers are seen, and funnel shaped. They are 3.5 centimeters (1.4 in) long with sepals that are partly fused as the base and divided into five somewhat uneven pointed lobes further up. The floral tube also divides into five pointed petal lobes, though sometimes only into four. The lobes can reach as much as 15 millimeters in length with a somewhat rough edge.

The inside of the floral tube has a circle of long hairs, a characteristic that distinguishes species in Gentianella from those in Gentiana. Each flower has five stamens and two stigmas inside the throat of the flower. Each plant will have as few as four or as many 47 flowers over the course of its blooming period. Flowering can begin as early as May and finish as late as October.

== Taxonomy ==
Gentianella germanica was scientifically described and named Gentiana germanica by Carl Ludwig Willdenow in 1798. It was moved to the genus Gentianella in 1912 by Carl Julius Bernhard Börner giving the species its accepted name. It has 36 synonyms of the species or one of its two subspecies.

Table of Synonyms
Name	Year	Rank	Synonym of:	Notes
Eyrythalia germanica (Willd.) Schrank	1821	species	G. germanica	≡ hom.
Eyrythalia uniflora Bercht. & J.Presl	1824	species	subsp. germanica	= het.
Gentiana amarella Froel.	1796	species	subsp. germanica	= het., nom. illeg.
Gentiana amarella subsp. germanica (Willd.) Čelak.	1871	subspecies	G. germanica	≡ hom.
Gentiana amarella var. germanica (Willd.) F.Towns.	1883	variety	G. germanica	≡ hom.
Gentiana campestriformis Rouy	1908	species	subsp. germanica	= het.
Gentiana campestris All.	1785	species	subsp. germanica	= het., nom. illeg.
Gentiana compacta Hegetschw.	1839	species	subsp. germanica	= het.
Gentiana critica Ehrh. ex Griseb	1838	species	subsp. germanica	= het.
Gentiana flava Mérat ex Loisel.	1827	species	subsp. germanica	= het., nom. illeg.
Gentiana flavescens Vis. ex Griseb.	1838	species	subsp. germanica	= het.
Gentiana flavicans Perret ex Colla	1835	species	subsp. germanica	= het.
Gentiana germanica Willd.	1798	species	G. germanica	≡ hom.
Gentiana germanica proles campestriformis Rouy	1908	proles	subsp. germanica	= het.
Gentiana germanica var. minor G.Mey.	1836	variety	subsp. germanica	= het.
Gentiana germanica var. ramosissima Boenn.	1824	variety	subsp. germanica	= het.
Gentiana macrocalyx Čelak.	1890	species	subsp. germanica	= het., nom. illeg.
Gentiana murbeckii A.Kern.	1894	species	subsp. germanica	= het.
Gentiana obliqua Nees	1818	species	subsp. germanica	= het.
Gentiana petrogradiana H.R.Wehrh.	1931	species	subsp. germanica	= het.
Gentiana polymorpha Wettst.	1898	species	subsp. germanica	= het., nom. superfl.
Gentiana polymorpha subsp. solstitialis Wettst.	1898	subspecies	G. germanica	≡ hom., nom. superfl.
Gentiana praematura Borbás	1894	species	subsp. germanica	= het.
Gentiana pseudogermanica Gelmi	1893	species	subsp. germanica	= het.
Gentiana solstitialis Wettst.	1897	species	G. germanica	≡ hom., nom. superfl.
Gentianella germanica subsp. solstitialis Holub	1967	subspecies	G. germanica	≡ hom., not validly publ.
Gentianella saxonica (W.Hempel) G.H.Loos	2010	species	subsp. saxonica	≡ hom.
Gentianella solstitialis G.H.Loos	2010	species	G. germanica	≡ hom., nom. superfl.
Gentiana serbica Formánek	1898	species	subsp. germanica	= het.
Gentiana uechtritzii Wettst.	1892	species	subsp. germanica	= het.
Gentiana wettsteinii Murb.	1892	species	subsp. germanica	= het.
Gentianella polymorpha (Wettst.) Skalický & Toman	1958	species	subsp. germanica	= het.
Hippion amarella F.W.Schmidt	1793	species	subsp. germanica	= het.
Opsanthe flava Fourr.	1869	species	subsp. germanica	= het.
Opsanthe germanica (Willd.) Fourr.	1869	species	G. germanica	≡ hom.
Opsanthe obtusifola Fourr.	1869	species	subsp. germanica	= het.
Notes: ≡ homotypic synonym; = heterotypic synonym

=== Names ===
Gentianella germanica is known by the common name German gentian although it is found in many other European countries in addition to Germany. It is also known as the Chiltern gentian or very occasionally as scarce autumn felwort.

== Range and habitat ==
Gentianella germanica is native to Western and Central Europe from south-central England to the Czech Republic. It is most common in northern France and locally common in the Chiltern Hills to northern Hampshire in England. In the low countries of the Netherlands, Belgium, and Luxembourg it grows largely away from the coasts. In Germany it is quite widespread largely in southern states such as Baden-Württemberg, Bavaria, Hesse, Rhineland-Palatinate, and Saarland, but can also be found in Lower Saxony, North Rhine-Westphalia, Saxony, Saxony-Anhalt, and Thuringia to the north and east. It is also native to Switzerland and mountainous areas of the Czech Republic and Poland, but records to the southeast may be Gentianella rhaetica according to the botanist Michael Hassler. According to the German Federal Agency for Nature Conservation it is also native to mountainous areas of northern Italy, all but the eastern parts of Austria, and a small area of northern Slovenia.

German gentians typically grow in grasslands with nutrient-poor calcareous soils, usually fairly moist areas. However, they can also be found in open scrublands. It can readily colonize bare chalk soil in chalk pits, areas disturbed by rabbits, and by offroad vehicles, but is not very successful at competing with other plants. German gentians also grow in the mountains of Upper Silesia in Poland on waste from calamine mining that are contaminated by heavy metals such as zinc, lead, and cadmium. The species grows at a wide range of elevations from lowlands to alpine habitats.

== Ecology ==
The flowers of German gentians are pollinated by solitary bees, bumblebees, hoverflies, and owlet moths. Populations growing on heavy metal contaminated soils the plants produce more flowers, seeds, and leaves on average than from their usual habitat.

== Culture ==
In 2002 the charity Plantlife held a vote by members of the public to choose a flower for each county and city in the United Kingdom. The Chiltern Gentian was selected for the county of Buckinghamshire.
