= Gentianella crassulifolia =

Conservation status
- Vulnerable (IUCN 3.1)

Scientific classification
- Kingdom: Plantae
- Clade: Tracheophytes
- Clade: Angiosperms
- Clade: Eudicots
- Clade: Asterids
- Order: Gentianales
- Family: Gentianaceae
- Genus: Gentianella
- Species: G. crassulifolia

Binomial name
- Gentianella crassulifolia (Griseb.) Fabris

Synonyms
- Gentiana crassulifolia Griseb.; Gentiana crassulifolia var. grandiflora Wedd.; Gentiana crassulifolia var. selaginifolia Gilg; Gentiana lehmannii Gilg; Gentianella lehmannii (Gilg) Fabris

Species of plant

Gentianella crassulifolia is a species of flowering plant in the family Gentianaceae.

It is endemic to Ecuador. Its natural habitat is subtropical or tropical high-altitude shrubland.
