= Gentianella flaviflora =

Conservation status
- Endangered (IUCN 3.1)

Scientific classification
- Kingdom: Plantae
- Clade: Tracheophytes
- Clade: Angiosperms
- Clade: Eudicots
- Clade: Asterids
- Order: Gentianales
- Family: Gentianaceae
- Genus: Gentianella
- Species: G. flaviflora

Binomial name
- Gentianella flaviflora (Griseb.) Fabris

Synonyms
- Gentiana flaviflora (Griseb.) Gilg; Gentiana foliosa var. flaviflora Griseb.

Species of plant

Gentianella flaviflora is a species of flowering plant in the Gentianaceae family. It is endemic to Cañar Province in Ecuador. Its natural habitat is tropical high-elevation grassland from 3,000 to >4,500 metres elevation.
