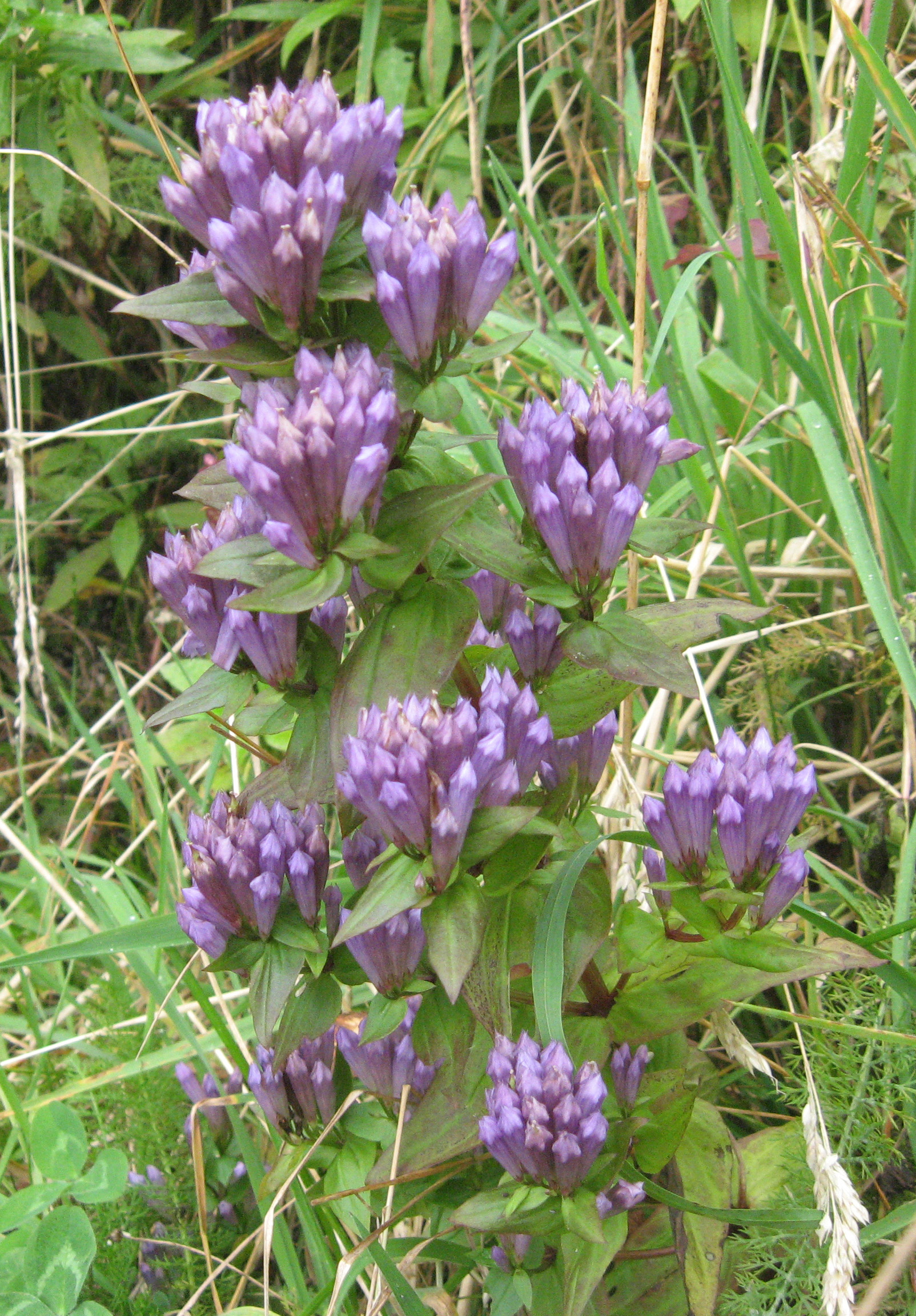
- Subspecies quinquefolia

Scientific classification
- Kingdom: Plantae
- Clade: Tracheophytes
- Clade: Angiosperms
- Clade: Eudicots
- Clade: Asterids
- Order: Gentianales
- Family: Gentianaceae
- Genus: Gentianella
- Species: G. quinquefolia

Binomial name
- Gentianella quinquefolia (L.) Small

Synonyms
- Gentiana quinquefolia L. (basionym)

= Gentianella quinquefolia =

Species of flowering plant

Gentianella quinquefolia, commonly called agueweed, is a flowering plant in the gentian family. It is native to eastern North America.

== Subspecies ==
There are two subspecies:

- Gentianella quinquefolia ssp. occidentalis - a more western variety, with larger flowers. Found in dry calcareous areas.
- Gentianella quinquefolia ssp. quinquefolia - primarily Appalachian, with smaller flowers. Found in forests and Appalachian balds.
