= Gentianella longibarbata =

Conservation status
- Endangered (IUCN 3.1)

Scientific classification
- Kingdom: Plantae
- Clade: Tracheophytes
- Clade: Angiosperms
- Clade: Eudicots
- Clade: Asterids
- Order: Gentianales
- Family: Gentianaceae
- Genus: Gentianella
- Species: G. longibarbata

Binomial name
- Gentianella longibarbata (Gilg) Fabris

Synonyms
- Gentiana longibarbata Gilg

Species of flowering plant

Gentianella longibarbata is a species of flowering plant in the family Gentianaceae. It is endemic to Ecuador. Its natural habitat is subtropical or tropical high-elevation grassland.
