= Gentianella splendens =

Conservation status
- Least Concern (IUCN 3.1)

Scientific classification
- Kingdom: Plantae
- Clade: Tracheophytes
- Clade: Angiosperms
- Clade: Eudicots
- Clade: Asterids
- Order: Gentianales
- Family: Gentianaceae
- Genus: Gentianella
- Species: G. splendens

Binomial name
- Gentianella splendens (Gilg) Fabris

Synonyms
- Gentiana splendens Gilg

Species of plant

Gentianella splendens is a species of flowering plant in the family Gentianaceae. It is endemic to Ecuador. Its natural habitats are subtropical or tropical swamps and subtropical or tropical high-altitude shrubland.
