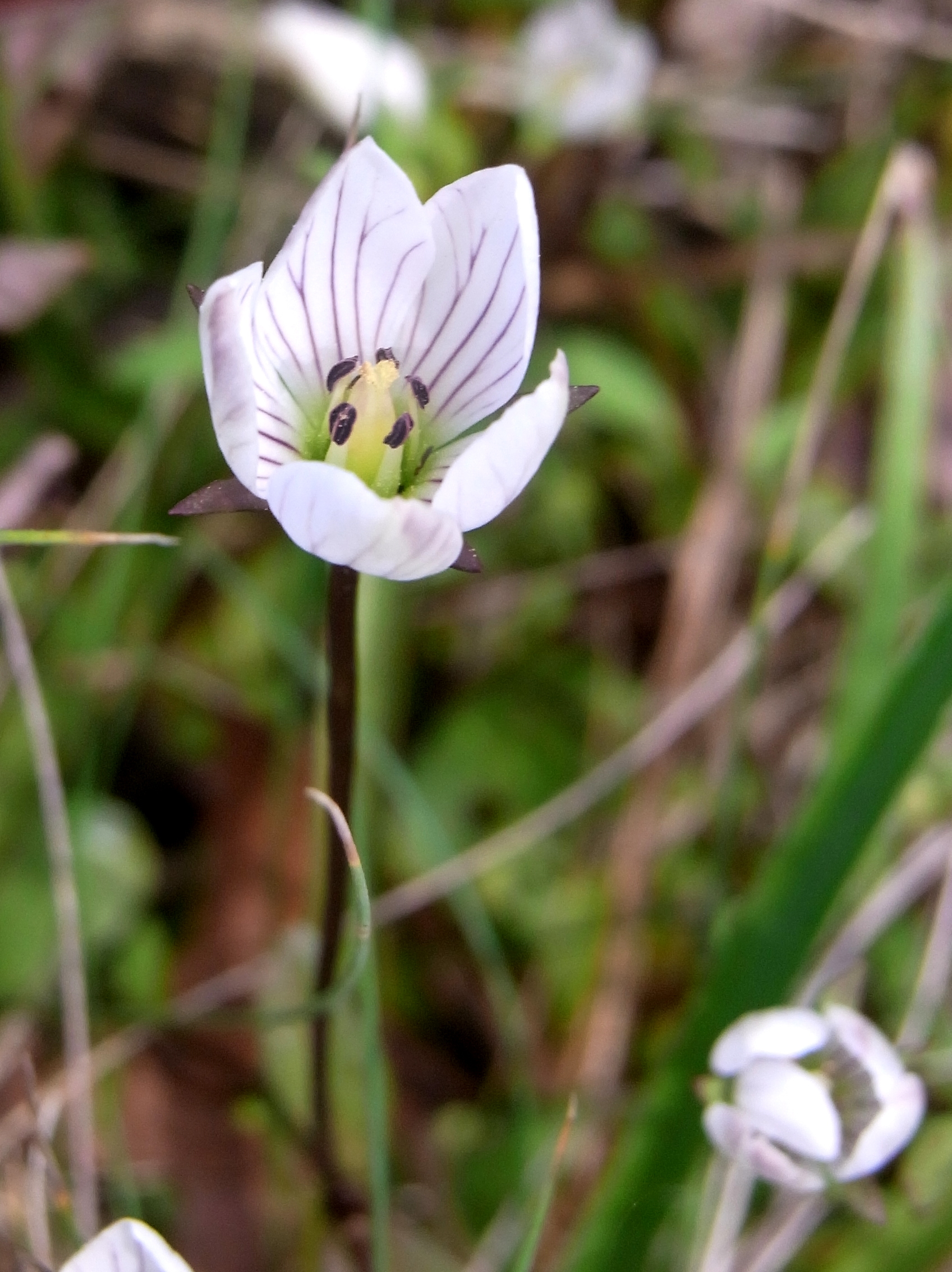

Scientific classification
- Kingdom: Plantae
- Clade: Tracheophytes
- Clade: Angiosperms
- Clade: Eudicots
- Clade: Asterids
- Order: Gentianales
- Family: Gentianaceae
- Genus: Gentianella
- Species: G. barringtonensis

Binomial name
- Gentianella barringtonensis (L.G.Adams) Glenny

Synonyms
- Chionogentias barringtonensis L.G.Adams; Gentianella diemensis (Griseb.) J.H.Willis

= Gentianella barringtonensis =

Species of plant

Gentianella barringtonensis, the Barrington snow gentian, is a species of the genus Gentianella native to New South Wales, Australia.
