= Gentianella gracilis =

Conservation status
- Endangered (IUCN 3.1)

Scientific classification
- Kingdom: Plantae
- Clade: Tracheophytes
- Clade: Angiosperms
- Clade: Eudicots
- Clade: Asterids
- Order: Gentianales
- Family: Gentianaceae
- Genus: Gentianella
- Species: G. gracilis

Binomial name
- Gentianella gracilis (Raf.) Fabris

Synonyms
- Gentiana gracilis Kunth, nom. illeg. homonym. post.; Pneumonanthe gracilis Raf.

Species of plant

Gentianella gracilis is a species of flowering plant in the Gentianaceae family. It is endemic to south-central and southern Ecuador. Its natural habitat is subtropical or tropical high-elevation grassland.

The species was first described as Gentiana gracilis by Carl Sigismund Kunth in 1818, but that name had already been published and was determined to be invalid. In 1837 Constantine Samuel Rafinesque placed the species in genus Pneumonanthe as P. gracilis, the first validly published name. In 1960 Humberto Antonio Fabris placed the species in genus Gentianella as G. gracilis.
