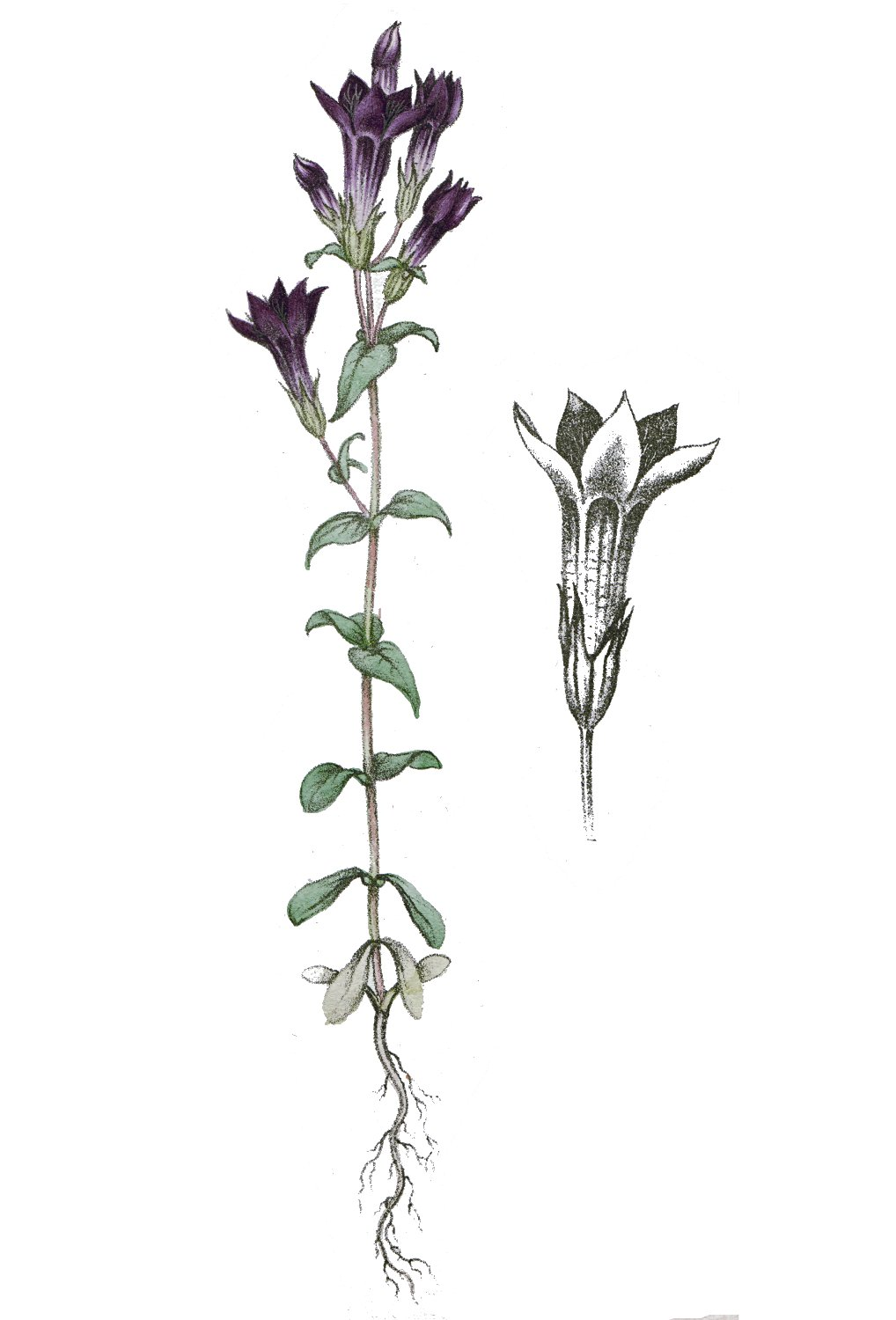

Conservation status
- Secure (NatureServe)

Scientific classification
- Kingdom: Plantae
- Clade: Embryophytes
- Clade: Tracheophytes
- Clade: Angiosperms
- Clade: Eudicots
- Clade: Asterids
- Order: Gentianales
- Family: Gentianaceae
- Genus: Gentianella
- Species: G. amarella

Binomial name
- Gentianella amarella (L.) Börner

Synonyms
- Eyrythalia pulchella Gray; Gentiana amarella L.; Gentiana pulchella Salisb.; Gentianella amarella subsp. euamarella Á.Löve & D.Löve; Gentianella acuta (Michaux) Hiitonen; Gentianusa amarella (L.) Pohl; Opsantha amarella (L.) Delarbre

= Gentianella amarella =

Plant species in the gentian family

Gentianella amarella, the autumn gentian, autumn dwarf gentian, or autumn felwort, is a short biennial plant flowering plant in the gentian family, Gentianaceae. It is found throughout Northern Europe, the western and northern United States, and Canada.

== Description ==
Gentianella amarella the autumn gentian, autumn dwarf gentian, or autumn felwort is a biennial herbaceous plant, which only produces a low leaf rosette with elliptical to lanceolate leaves in its first year. In the second year it usually grows a stem from 5 to 30 (3 to 50) centimeters long. The stem is straight or branched just above the base; at flowering time it is without leaves which distinguishes it from similar species.

=== Generative characteristics ===
The flowering period is from July to early October, and the axils produce numerous flowers.

The relatively small, hermaphrodite flowers are purplish bells (reddish-violet corolla) are trumpet-shaped between 12 and 22 mm long and have five petals with double perianth (calyx and corolla). The cup is much shorter than the crown tube. The five vestibules are upright and mostly somewhat unequal. The coronet is bearded. The ovary and the fruit are sedentary or rarely short-stalked.

The number of chromosomes is 2n = 36.

== Taxonomy and distribution ==
Gentianella amarella was first published in 1753 under the name (basionym) Gentiana amarella by Carl Linnaeus. The new combination to Gentianella amarella was published in 1912 by Carl Julius Bernhard Börner. The epithet amarella means somewhat bitter.

There are about five subspecies of Gentianella amarella:

Image	Subspecies	Distribution
	Gentianella amarella subsp. acuta (Michx.) J.M.Gillett (syn.: Comastoma acutum (Michx.) Y.Z.Zhao & X.Zhang, Gentiana acuta Michx., Gentianella acuta (Michx.) Hiitonen	It is widespread in temperate Asia and North America, e.g. Mongolia, Inner Mongolia, the Chinese provinces Heilongjiang, Hebei, Jilin, Liaoning, Shanxi, Shandong, Shaanxi as well as Ningxia, the Eastern Russian territories of Magadan, Buryatia, Gorno-Altay, Tuva, Yakutia-Sakha, Krasnoyarsk, Chita and Irkutsk, the Canadian provinces of Quebec, Nova Scotia, Ontario, New Brunswick, Newfoundland, Northwest Territory, Yukon Territory, Saskatchewan, Alberta, Manitoba, British Columbia and Nunavut, the US states Alaska, North Dakota, South Dakota, Maine, Vermont, Colorado, Idaho, Montana, Oregon, Washington, Wyoming, New Mexico, Arizona, Nevada, Utah and California and the northern Mexican states of Durango and Nuevo León.
	Gentianella amarella subsp. amarella (syn.: Gentiana livonica Eschsch. ex Griseb., Gentianella amarella subsp. hibernica N.M.Pritch.	It is located in North, South, Southeast, Central and Eastern Europe, in Caucasus and Central Asia, [Siberia] widespread. Armenia, Azerbaijan, Dagestan, Ciscaucasia, Kazakhstan, Magadan, Buryatia, Gorno-Altay, Tuva, Yakutia-Sakha, Altai, Krasnoyarsk, Chita, Irkutsk, Kemerovo, Novosibirsk, Omsk, Tomsk, Tyumen, Karelia, Murmansk, Belarus, Estonia, Lithuania, Latvia, European parts of Russia, Ukraine, Romania, Bulgaria, Serbia, Slovakia, Hungary, Poland, Czech Republic, Austria, Germany, Belgium, Switzerland, Italy, France, Denmark, Sweden, Norway, Finland, Ireland and United Kingdom.
	Gentianella amarella subsp. lingulata (C.Agardh) Holub (syn.: Gentiana lingulata C.Agardh	It is found in the Czech Republic and Eastern Europe.
	Gentianella amarella subsp.reussii (Tocl) Holub	It occurs in Slovakia
	Gentianella amarella subsp.septentrionalis (Druce) N.M.Pritch.	It occurs in Great Britain and Iceland.

== Ecology ==
Its habitat is in grass, often on lime-rich soil (in England typically on chalk). It grows on dry, sandy or calcareous soils, but also on wet peat or marl soils and thus thrives in bog meadows. It is growing in the molinion association.
