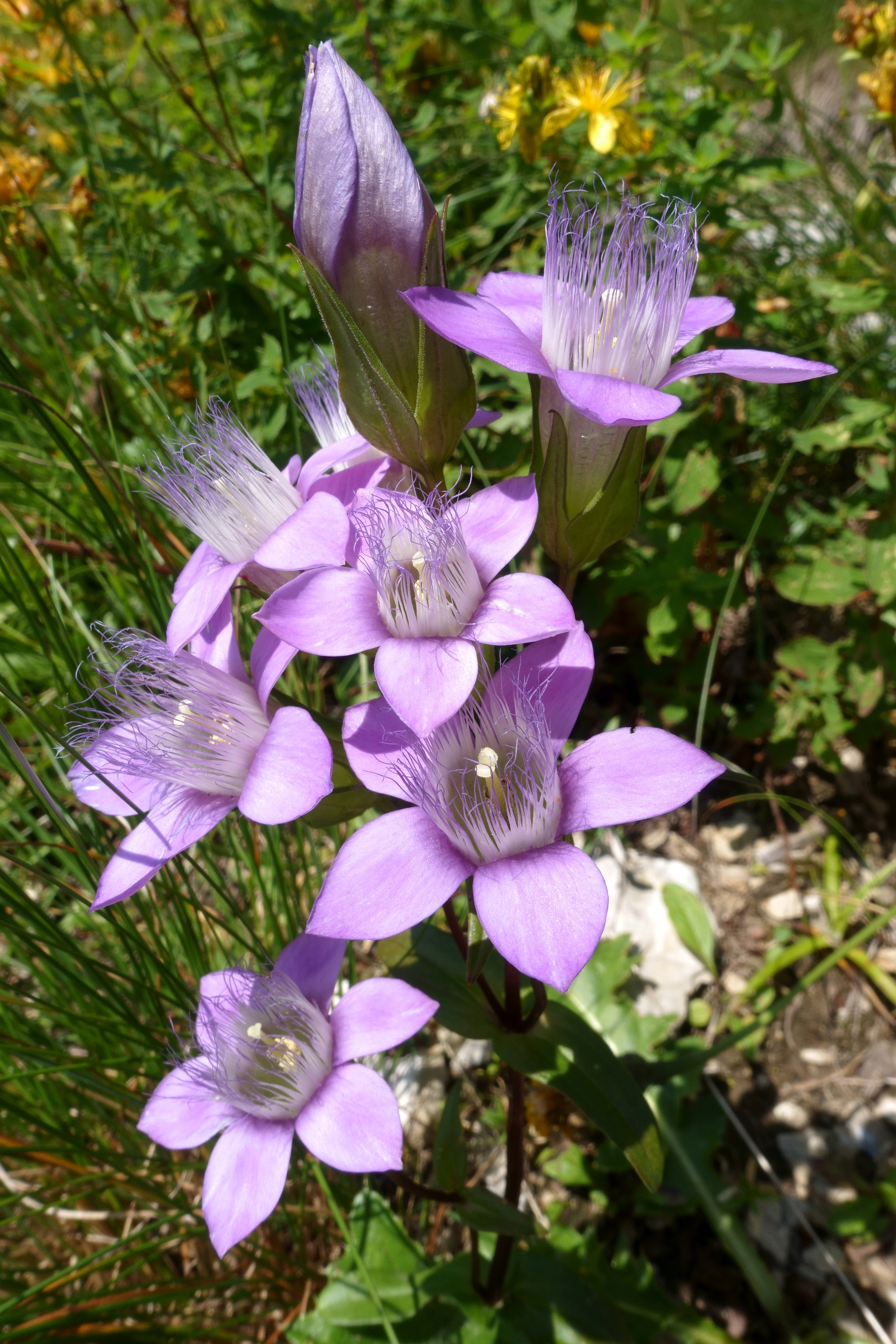
- Gentianella aspera

Scientific classification
- Kingdom: Plantae
- Clade: Embryophytes
- Clade: Tracheophytes
- Clade: Angiosperms
- Clade: Eudicots
- Clade: Asterids
- Order: Gentianales
- Family: Gentianaceae
- Tribe: Gentianeae
- Subtribe: Swertiinae
- Genus: Gentianella; Moench

Species
- See text

= Gentianella =

Genus of plants

Gentianella is a plant genus in the gentian family (Gentianaceae). Plants of this genus are known commonly as dwarf gentians.

As of 2000 there were about 256 species in this genus. They are herbs that occur in alpine and arctic habitat types. They are distributed in the Americas, Eurasia, northern Africa, Australia, and New Zealand.

== Selected species ==
- Gentianella alborosea – Hercampuri; Peru
- Gentianella amarella – Autumn gentian, felwort; Northern Europe, United States, Canada
- Gentianella anglica – Early gentian; Great Britain
- Gentianella androsacea Ecuador
- Gentianella anisodonta Europe (Austria, Switzerland, Italy, Slovenia, Croatia and Turkey.
- Gentianella antarctica
- Gentianella arenaria Peru
- Gentianella arenarioides Peru
- Gentianella armerioides Peru
- Gentianella auriculata
- Gentianella austriaca Eastern Switzerland, Austria
- Gentianella aspera Austria
- Gentianella barringtonensis – Barrington snow gentian; New South Wales
- Gentianella bellidifolia New Zealand
- Gentianella bicolor Peru
- Gentianella brunneotincta Peru
- Gentianella bulgarica
- Gentianella bussmannii Peru
- Gentianella calanchoides Peru
- Gentianella calcarea Peru
- Gentianella campanuliformis Peru
- Gentianella campestris – Field gentian; northern, central and southern Europe
- Gentianella canoi Peru
- Gentianella carneorubra Peru
- Gentianella centamalensis Peru
- Gentianella cerastioides Ecuador
- Gentianella cerina – Giant gentian; New Zealand
- Gentianella cernua Ecuador
- Gentianella cerrateae Peru
- Gentianella chamuchui Peru
- Gentianella chlorantha Peru
- Gentianella ciliata – Fringed gentian
- Gentianella concinna New Zealand
- Gentianella corymbifera New Zealand
- Gentianella crassulifolia Ecuador
- Gentianella chrysosphaera Peru
- Gentianella fastigiata Ecuador
- Gentianella flaviflora Ecuador
- Gentianella foliosa Ecuador
- Gentianella fuscicaulis Ecuador
- Gentianella germanica – Chiltern gentian, German gentian; UK and Europe
- Gentianella gilioides Ecuador
- Gentianella gracilis Ecuador
- Gentianella heterosepala – Autumn gentian
- Gentianella hirculus Ecuador
- Gentianella hypericoides Ecuador
- Gentianella hyssopifolia Ecuador
- Gentianella jamesonii Ecuador
- Gentianella limoselloides Ecuador
- Gentianella longibarbata Ecuador
- Gentianella lutescens Europe (Carpathians)
- Gentianella microcalyx
- Gentianella montesinosii Peru
- Gentianella nitida Peru
- Gentianella oellgaardii Ecuador
- Gentianella patula
- Gentianella polyantha Ecuador
- Gentianella praecox Germany, Austria, Czech Republic and Poland
- Gentianella profusa Ecuador
- Gentianella propinqua
- Gentianella quechuana Bolivia
- Gentianella quipuscoana Peru
- Gentianella quinquefolia – Agueweed; eastern North America
- Gentianella rupicola Ecuador
- Gentianella saxifragoides Ecuador
- Gentianella scopulorum – Charleston gentian
- Gentianella spenceri
- Gentianella splendens Ecuador
- Gentianella sulphurea Ecuador
- Gentianella tenella – Slender gentian
- Gentianella tortuosa
- Gentianella uliginosa – Dune gentian; Europe
- Gentianella wayqecha Ecuador
- Gentianella weberbaueri Peru
- Gentianella weigendii Peru
- Gentianella wislizeni Mexico
- Gentianella wrightii Mexico

== Description ==
=== Vegetative characteristics ===
Gentianella-species grow as one- to two-year-old or more rarely perennial herbaceous plants. The stem leaves are arranged cross-wise or more rarely whorled in ground leaf rosettes or distributed on the stem. The leaf blades are simple. Plants range from 3–100 cm in height.

=== Generative characteristics ===
Flowers end up individually or in a cymose inflorescence with double flower envelope. The hermaphrodite flowers are 0.5–5 cm long, have four or five petals with entire petal margins, displaying radial symmetry. They have one or two naked nectaries per petal lobe on the upper petal surface.

The four or five sepals have grown together. There is no connective skin in the calyx (unlike many in the Gentian family). The four or five sepals are fused in a tubular or funnel shape, but unlike with many Gentiana-types, no fold-flaps (plicae) are present between the corolla-tips. Appendages may be absent or present as fringed scales at the corolla-leaf-base. There are nectaries at the base of the corolla tube, the length of which varies considerably, and which is variously colored. Some have a ring of vascularized or non-vascularized fimbriae in the corolla throat. There is only one circle with four or five stamens, which are inserted at the corolla tube and do not protrude from it. The stylus is short to absent.

The two-lobed capsule (fruit) contains many seeds with a smooth to warty surface.

== Distribution ==
Most Gentianella'-species are native to South America. In addition, species occur in the Temperate Zones of New Zealand, Australia, Asia, Europe, North America and northwestern Africa.

== Taxonomy ==
The genus Gentianella was introduced in 1794 by Conrad Moench in Methodus Plantas Horti Botanici et Agri Marburgensis : a staminum situ describendi. The genus name Gentianella is a diminutive and means directly translated "Little Gentian". synonym for Gentianella (Moench) are: Aliopsis (Omer & Qaiser), Aloitis (Raf.), Arctogentia (Á. Löve), Chionogentias (L.G.Adams), Parajaeschkea (Burkill), Pitygentias (Gilg), Selatium (G. Don).

The genus Gentianella belongs to the subtribe Swertiinae from the tribe Gentianeae within the family of Gentians (Gentianaceae).

In the past, Gentianella were added to the genus gentians (Gentiana), but these two genera belong to different subtribe today. The clearest distinguishing feature is that in all Gentianella species native to Central Europe, a fringed scale supplied with guide bundles per each petal tip is present in the throat of the corolla. This resembles a wreath (which is why it is called "wreath gentian" in German).

Also, Gentianopsis with their fringed corolla-ends and hair-ends ('Comastoma') which are likewise fringed, but have anatomically differently constructed pharyngeal scales, were later separated of the Gentinellas.
