= Carl Julius Bernhard Börner =

German entomologist

Carl Julius Bernhard Börner (28 May 1880 – 14 June 1953) was a German entomologist.

Börner was born in Bremen and died in Naumburg. His collections of Collembola are located in the Natural History Museum, London and the Deutsches Entomologisches Institut in Müncheberg. He also is known to have formally described 43 plants.
