= Purple moor grass and rush pastures =

One of UK's natural habitats

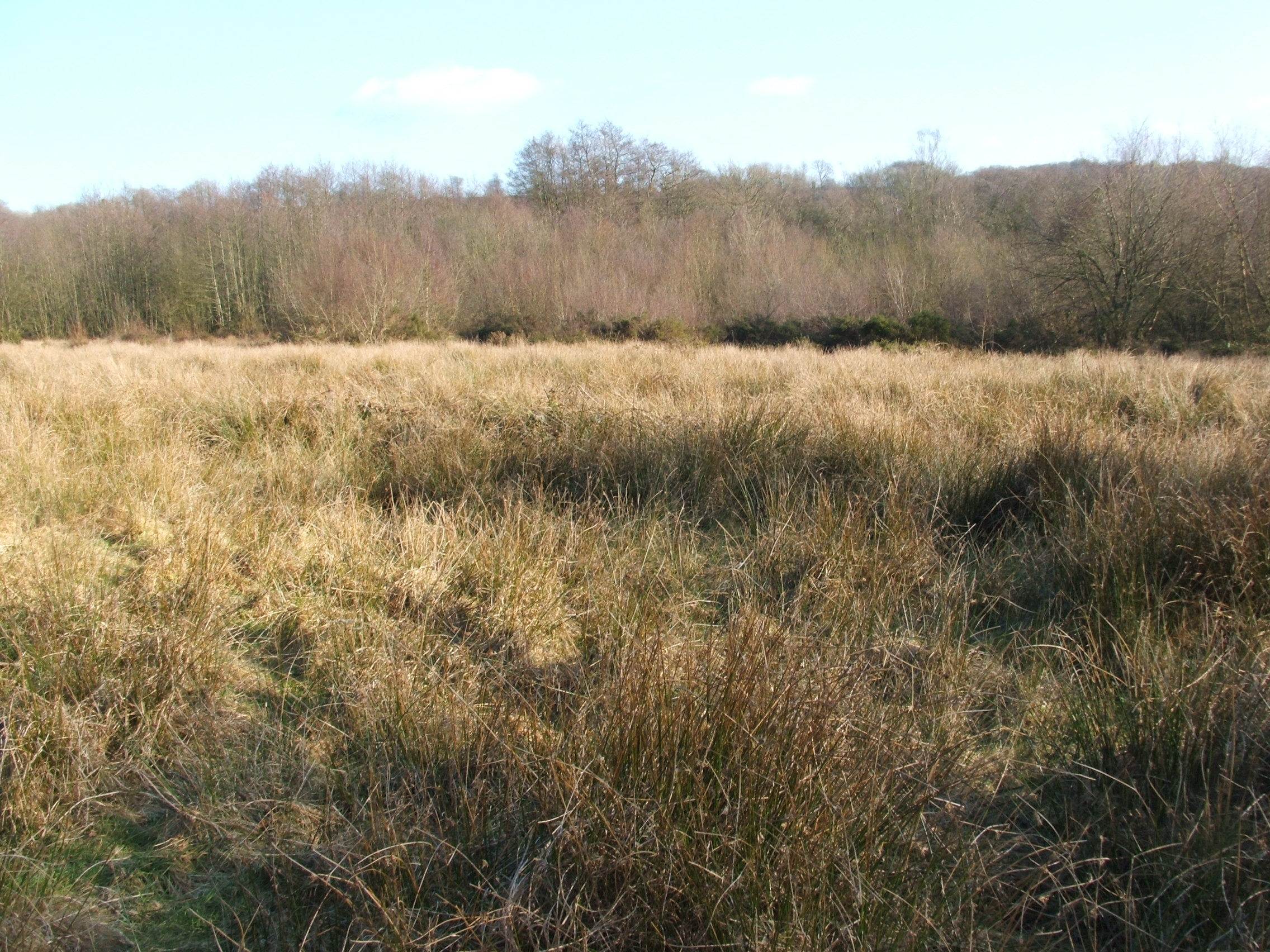

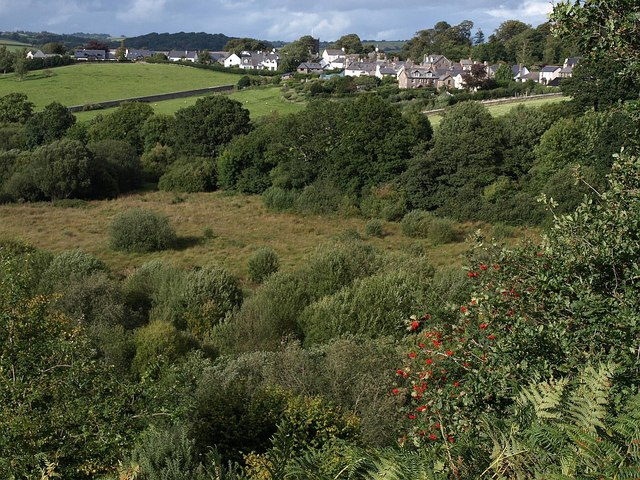
Padley Common - part of Chagford Commons is an area of purple moor grass and rush pasture

Purple moor grass and rush pastures is a type of Biodiversity Action Plan habitat in the UK. It occurs on poorly drained neutral and acidic soils of the lowlands and upland fringe. It is found in the southwest of England, especially in Devon.

The vegetation consists of species-rich, semi-natural grassland containing abundant purple moor grass (Molinia caerulea) and one or more of several creeping rushes: sharp-flowered rush (Juncus acutiflorus), jointed rush (Juncus articulatus) and blunt-flowered rush (Juncus subnodulosus).

Only 8% remains of the area thought to have existed in 1900. In the UK estimate the area is thought to be less than 70,000 hectares (170,000 acres). Their importance is recognised and are included as a priority habitat in the United Kingdom Biodiversity Action Plan.

== Etymology ==
In Devon and Cornwall it is known as culm grassland, after the Culm Measures on which it is predominantly found. In East Anglia it is known as litter meadow due to the practice of cutting it for bedding. In Wales it is known as rhôs pasture.

== Typical grasses ==
Common bent (Agrostis capillaris), crested dog's-tail (Cynosurus cristatus), floating sweet grass (Glyceria fluitans), marsh foxtail (Alopecurus geniculatus), purple moor grass (Molinia caerulea), red fescue (Festuca rubra), sweet vernal grass (Anthoxanthum odoratum).

== Characteristic species ==
The Natural England Higher Level Stewardship Farm Environmental Plan handbook defines the habitat as grassland with at least two of the following species are found frequently, with another two being found occasionally.

- Bog asphodel (Narthecium ossifragum)
- Bog mosses (Sphagnum spp)
- Bog pimpernel (Lysimachia tenella, syn. Anagallis tenella)
- Bugle (Ajuga reptans)
- Common valerian (Valeriana officinalis)
- Common meadow-rue (Thalictrum flavum)
- Cross-leaved heath (Erica tetralix)
- Devil's-bit scabious (Succisa pratensis)
- Globeflower (Trollius europaeus)
- Greater burnet (Sanguisorba officinalis)
- Greater bird's foot trefoil (Lotus pedunculatus)
- Hemp-agrimony (Eupatorium cannabinum)
- Jointed rush (Juncus articulatus)
- Lesser spearwort (Ranunculus flammula)
- Lesser water-parsnip (Berula erecta)
- Lousewort (Pedicularis sylvatica)
- Fen bedstraw (Galium uliginosum)
- Marsh bedstraw (Galium palustre)
- Marsh cinquefoil (Potentilla palustris)
- Marsh hawk's-beard (Crepis paludosa)
- Marsh-marigold (Caltha palustris)
- Marsh pennywort (Hydrocotyle vulgaris)
- Marsh valerian (Valeriana dioica)
- Marsh violet (Viola palustris)
- Meadow thistle (Cirsium dissectum)
- Meadowsweet (Filipendula ulmaria)
- Orchids (Orchidaceae)
- Ragged robin (Lychnis flos-cuculi)
- Rough hawkbit (Leontodon hispidus)
- Saw-wort (Serratula tinctoria)
- Sneezewort (Achillea ptarmica)
- Tormentil (Potentilla erecta)
- Water avens (Geum rivale)
- Water mint (Mentha aquatica)
- Whorled Caraway (Carum verticillatum)
- Wild angelica (Angelica sylvaticum)
- Small blue-green sedges: glaucous sedge (Carex flacca), common sedge (Carex nigra), carnation sedge (Carex panicea) etc.
- Yellow flag (Iris pseudacorus)

== Key animal species associated with purple moor grass and rush pastures ==
- Marsh fritillary butterfly (Eurodryas aurinia), uses scattered scrub and carr in September/October.
- Brown hairstreak (Theccla betulae)
- Narrow-bordered bee hawkmoth (Hemaris tityus) - fly during April/May, during the day.
- Eurasian curlew (Numenius arquata) - lays eggs in April/May in open ground on a mound or tussock, incubates them through to June, and young may not be ready to fly until late July or into August.
- Common snipe (Gallinago gallinago)
- Barn owl (Tyto alba)
- Marbled white (Melanargia galathea) on the wing in June/July.
- Reed bunting (Emberiza schoeniclus) uses scattered scrub and carr in September/October.

== British National Vegetative Classification ==
The main British National Vegetation Classification communities associated with purple moor grass and rush pastures include M23 (Juncus effusus/acutiflorus-Galium palustre rush pasture), M25 (Molinia caerulea-Potentilla erecta mire), M26 (Molinia caerulea-Crepis paludosa mire) and British NVC community MG10 (Holco-Juncetum effusi rush-pasture).

== Threats ==
- Drainage
- Cultivation
- Fertiliser application
- Overgrazing
- Frequent burning
- Undergrazing - leading to succession to scrub and woodland. Can become dominated by soft rush (Juncus effusus)
- Afforestation

== Management ==
Natural England Guidance advocates an average grass height of 7 and 8 centimetres (2.8 and 3.1 in) for rush during April and May, increasing to 10 and 13 centimetres (3.9 and 5.1 in) in June to October, a quarter of the sward no more than 15 centimetres (5.9 in) for grass and 40 centimetres (16 in) for rushes - a diverse sward of shorter areas interspersed by taller tussocks.

Areas of dense litter are beneficial to overwintering insects and small mammals, but should be less than 25% of the total area in October.

== Protection ==
In the UK there are a number of initiatives to help prevent deterioration and to restore these sites. These include designation as Site of Special Scientific Interest, national nature reserves, voluntary entry into the Environmental Stewardship Scheme by landowners, or work by voluntary conservation organisations such as the Devon Wildlife Trust. The largest area of Culm grassland in Devon is Hare's Down, Knowstone & Rackenford Moors near Rackenford and is owned by Devon Wildlife Trust. Their management regime includes controlled burning in winter and light grazing by cattle in the summer. The aim is to control the amounts of scrub and bracken without removing them completely.
