= Nacton Meadows =

Protected area in Suffolk, England

Coordinates: 52.013°N 1.25°E

- Site of Special Scientific Interest
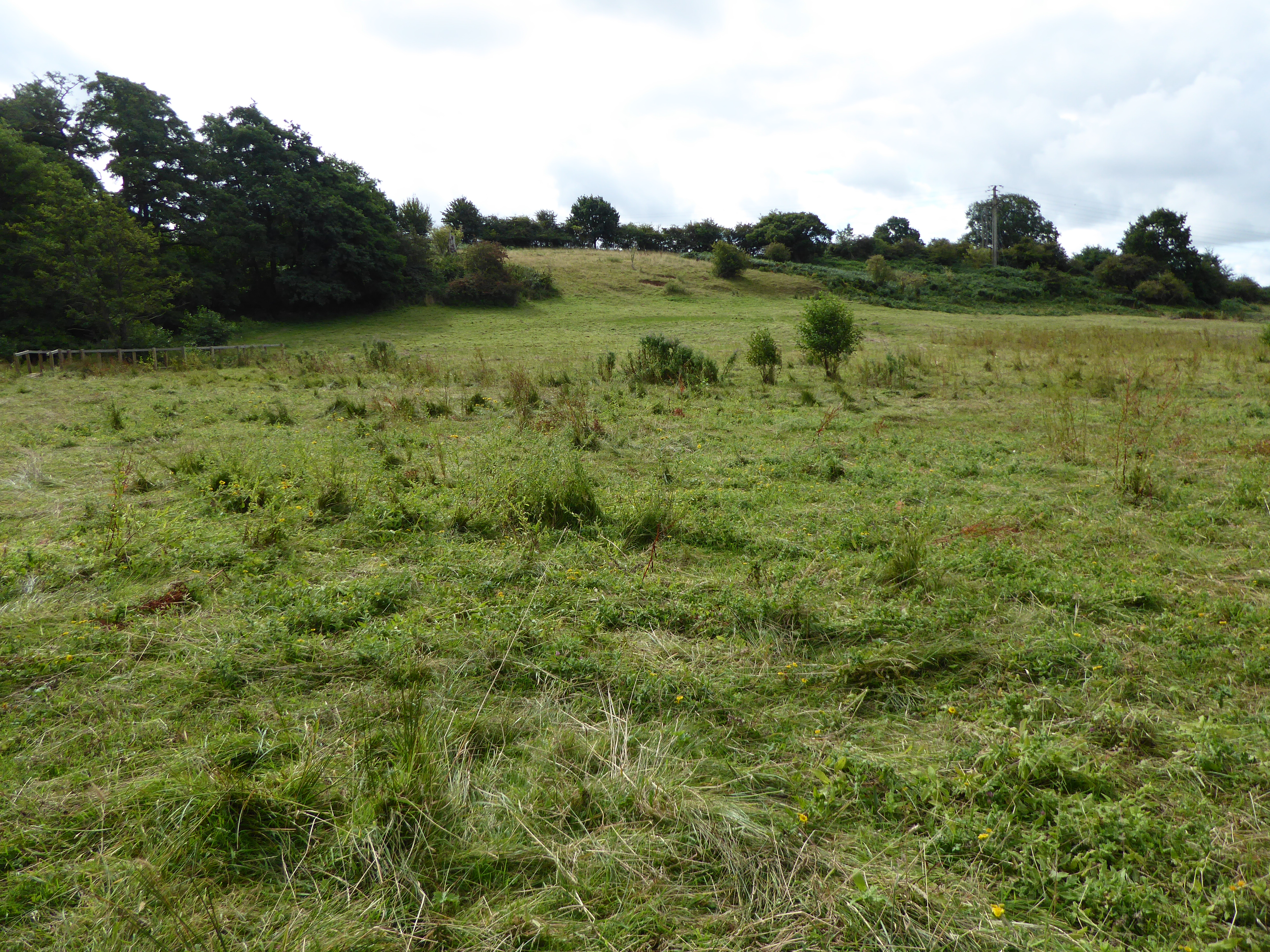
- Location of Nacton Meadows.
- Area of search: Suffolk
- Grid reference: TM 231 399
- Interest: Biological
- Area: 4.5 hectares
- Notification date: 1992
- Location map: Magic Map

Nacton Meadows is a 4.5-hectare (11-acre) biological Site of Special Scientific Interest north-west of Levington in Suffolk. It is in the Suffolk Coast and Heaths Area of Outstanding Natural Beauty

This site has fen meadow and grasslands. Wetter areas have more diverse flora, including Yorkshire-fog, crested dog's tail, sharp-flowered rush, greater bird's-foot-trefoil and the uncommon marsh arrowgrass.

A public footpath from Levington goes through the site.
