= British NVC community M22 =

Vegetation community in the United Kingdom

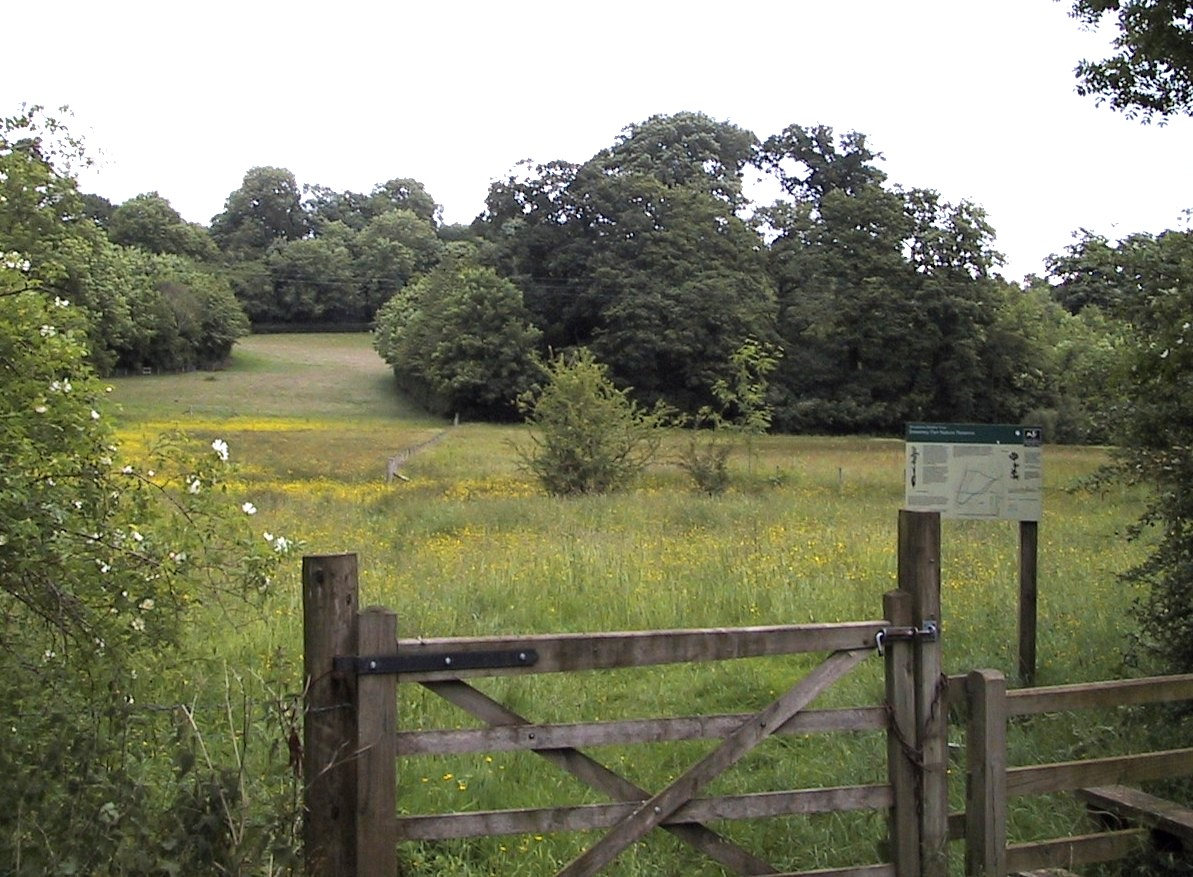
Shropshire Wildlife Trust's Sweeney Fen nature reserve is a prime example of an M22 meadow.

NVC community M22 is one of the mire communities in the British National Vegetation Classification system, characterised by a sward of blunt-flowered rush with other rushes, grasses, sedges and wetland plants, in calcareous wet meadows. It is a form of pasture found around springs, flushes and in river valley wetlands, and it is one of three rush pasture communities in the NVC. It was once quite widespread in the English lowlands but is now rare and localised.

== Description ==
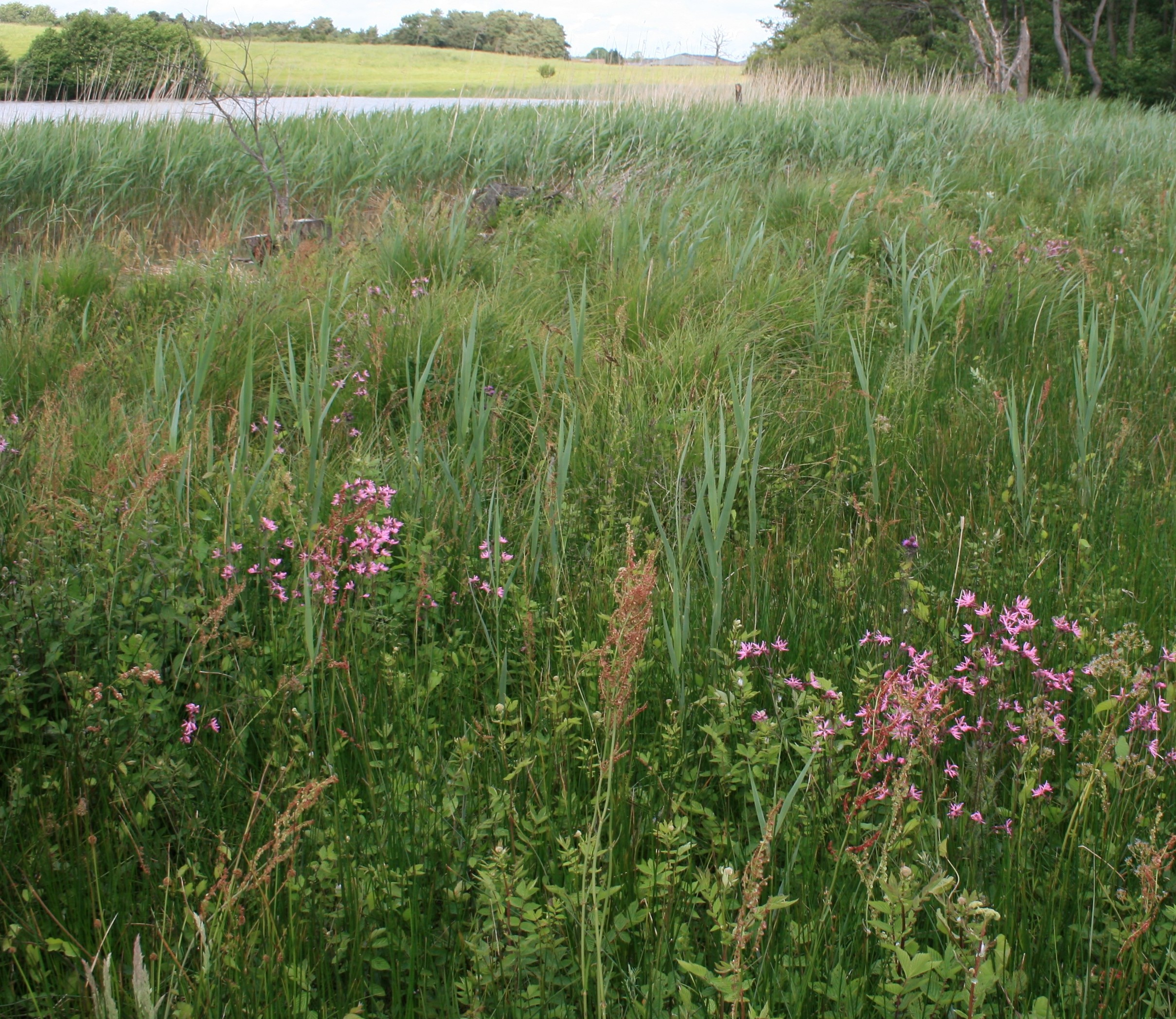
A meadow of M22 at Crose Mere, Shropshire

M22 Juncus subnodulosus fen-meadow is a widespread but uncommon community throughout lowland England and Wales. It is essentially a type of damp pasture that occurs where base-rich groundwater springs or surface water streams arise from chalk or limestone soils. It is often a species-rich type of vegetation with a mixture of grasses and rushes and a wide selection of forbs. The most characteristic plants are rushes, most commonly blunt-flowered rush but sometimes hard rush and jointed rush in varying proportions or even replacing it altogether towards the edge of its range. Soft-rush and sharp-flowered rush are much less likely, as they indicate more acidic conditions. The rushes are normally mixed with some sedges such as lesser pond-sedge, brown sedge and glaucous sedge.

Amongst the rushes and sedges there are always several species of grass and usually many other flowering plants, but the abundance of these is likely to be heavily influenced by the level of grazing. The most common grasses are common reed and Yorkshire-fog, with purple moor-grass sometimes present in the more acid stands and quaking-grass in alkaline conditions. Marsh-thistle, meadowsweet and water-mint are the commonest herbs to be found.

M22 may contain a large number of rare or scarce plants. These include milk-parsley (in East Anglia), meadow-rue, marsh lousewort, long-stalked yellow-sedge and marsh valerian.

There are four subcommunities of M22:

- M22a typical subcommunity conforms to the general community description
- M22b Briza media-Trifolium spp. is a slightly more calcareous and species-rich variant with less dominance by rushes and more flowering herbs such as southern marsh-orchid, early marsh-orchid and marsh helleborine
- M22c Carex elata vegetation is found on more peaty substrates, including old raised mires, and may contain Thelypteris palustris
- M22d Iris pseudacorus subcommunity is characterised by the dominance of taller plants such as common reed, meadowsweet and meadow-rue.

== Conservation ==
Purple moor-grass and rush pastures are considered a Priority Habitat (previously known as a Biodiversity Action Plan habitat) in Britain. This category includes M22 rush-pastures among several other types of damp pasture. Overall, this habitat type is thought to have declined very significantly in the 20th century but the 56,000 ha that remains is thought to be greater than in the whole of continental Europe. Only a very small proportion of that total is M22 fen-pasture, however, as the culm pastures of Devon and Welsh rhos pastures account for most of the resource.

== Zonation and succession ==
M22 is the main rush-pasture that develops in wet meads that are fed by base-rich groundwater or streams from chalk or limestone formations. It is widespread throughout the English lowlands but absent from western and northern parts where the geology is unsuitable. On neutral soils it is often replaced by MG10 Holcus lanatus-Juncus effusus rush-pasture and on more acid substrates by M23 Juncus acutiflorus rush-pasture.

A typical situation for M22 to develop is in damp parts of a meadow of MG5 Festuca rubra grassland where there is standing water for much of the year. On the edge of lakes or beside rivers it is likely to be adjoined by a rich fen community such as Phragmites australis reedbed.

== Other treatments ==
In Europe, this type of vegetation is subsumed into the much broader EUNIS habitat type R361 Atlantic and sub-Atlantic humid pastures, which has no conservation status.
