= British NVC community M23 =

NVC community M23 (Juncus effusus'/acutiflorus - Galium palustre rush-pasture) is one of the mire communities in the British National Vegetation Classification system.

It is a community that can be found in the Purple Moor and Rush pasture BAP habitat in England.

== Community composition ==
Constant species are:

- Galium palustre (Common Marsh Bedstraw)
- Holcus lanatus (Yorkshire Fog)
- Juncus effusus (Soft Rush)
- Juncus acutiflorus (Sharp flowered rush)
- Lotus pedunculatus (Greater birds foot trefoil)

== Distribution ==
This community can be found in England.

== Subcommunities ==
There are two subcommunities: a, Juncus acutiflorus and b, Juncus effusus.
