= British NVC community M25 =

UK plant community type

NVC Community M25 (Molinia caerulea - Potentilla erecta mire)is one of the 38 mire communities in the British National Vegetation Classification system.

== Community Composition ==
The following species are found in this community

- Molinia caerulea
- Potentilla erecta
