= Mires in the British National Vegetation Classification system =

UK plant community type

This article gives an overview of the mire plant communities in the British National Vegetation Classification system.

== Introduction ==
The mire communities of the NVC were described in Volume 2 of British Plant Communities, first published in 1991, along with the heath communities.

In total, 38 mire communities have been identified.

The mire communities consist of a number of separate subgroups.

- five bog plane communities (M17, M18, M19, M20 and M21)
- two wet heath communities (M15 and M16)
- four bog-pool communities (M1, M2, M3 and M4)
- four base-poor small sedge & rush communities (M5, M6, M7 and M8)
- six base-poor small sedge & Schoenus communities (M9, M10, M11, M12, M13 and M14)
- seven fen-meadow / rush-pasture communities (M22, M23, M24, M25, M26, M27 and M28)
- two soakaway communities (M29 and M30)
- eight communities of springs and rills (M31, M32, M33, M34, M35, M36, M37 and M38)

== List of mire communities ==
The following is a list of the communities that make up this category:

- M1 Sphagnum auriculatum bog pool community
- M2 Sphagnum cuspidatum/recurvum bog pool community
- M3 Eriophorum angustifolium bog pool community
- M4 Carex rostrata - Sphagnum recurvum mire
- M5 Carex rostrata - Sphagnum squarrosum mire
- M6 Carex echinata - Sphagnum recurva/auriculatum mire
- M7 Carex curta - Sphagnum russowii mire
- M8 Carex rostrata - Sphagnum warnstorfii mire
- M9 Carex rostrata - Calligeron cuspidatum/giganteum mire
- M10 Carex dioica - Pinguicula vulgaris mire Pinguiculo-Caricetum dioicae Jones 1973 emend.
- M11 Carex demissa - Saxifraga aizoides mire Carici-Saxifragetum aizoidis McVean & Ratcliffe 1962 emend.
- M12 Carex saxatilis mire Caricetum saxatilis McVean & Ratcliffe 1962
- M13 Schoenus nigricans - Juncus subnodulosus mire Schoenetum nigricantis Koch 1926
- M14 Schoneus nigricans - Narthecium ossifragum mire
- M15 Scirpus cespitosus - Erica tetralix wet heath
- M16 Erica tetralix - Sphagnum compactum wet heath Ericetum tetralicis Schwickerath 1933
- M17 Scirpus cespitosus - Eriophorum vaginatum blanket mire
- M18 Erica tetralix - Sphagnum papillosum raised and blanket mire
- M19 Calluna vulgaris - Eriophorum vaginatum blanket mire
- M20 Eriophorum vaginatum raised and blanket mire
- M21 Narthecium ossifragum - Sphagnum papillosum valley mire Narthecio-Sphagnetum euatlanticum Duvigneaud 1949
- M22 Juncus subnodulosus - Cirsium palustre fen-meadow
- M23 Juncus effusus/acutiflorus - Galium palustre rush-pasture
- M24 Molinia caerulea - Cirsium dissectum fen-meadow Cirsium-Molinietum caeruleae Sissingh & De Vries 1942 emend.
- M25 Molinia caerulea - Potentilla erecta mire
- M26 Molinia caerulea - Crepis paludosa mire
- M27 Filipendula ulmaria - Angelica sylvestris mire
- M28 Iris pseudacorus - Filipendula ulmaria mire Filipendulo-Iridetum pseudacori Adam 1976 emend.
- M29 Hypericum elodes - Potamogeton polygonifolius soakaway Hyperico-Potametum polygonifolii (Allorge 1921) Braun-Blanquet & Tüxen 1952
- M30 Related vegetation of seasonally-inundated habitats Hydrocotyla-Baldellion Tüxen & Dierssen 1972
- M31 Anthelia judacea - Sphagnum auriculatum spring Sphagno auriculati-Anthelietum judaceae Shimwell 1972
- M32 Philonotis fontana - Saxifraga stellaris spring Philonoto-Saxifragetum stellaris Nordhagen 1943
- M33 Pohlia wahlenbergii var. glacialis spring Pohlietum glacialis McVean & Ratcliffe 1962
- M34 Carex demissa - Koenigia islandica flush
- M35 Ranunculus omiophyllus - Montia fontana rill
- M36 Lowland springs and streambanks of shaded situations Cardaminion (Maas 1959) Westhoff & den Held 1969
- M37 Cratoneuron commutatum - Festuca rubra spring
- M38 Cratoneuron commutatum - Carex nigra spring
