= British NVC community M24 =

UK plant community type

NVC community M24 (Molinia caerulea - Cirsium dissectum fen-meadow)is one of the 38 mire communities in the British National Vegetation Classification system.

== Community Composition ==
The following species are found in this community

- Molinia caerulea (Purple Moor Grass)
- Cirsium dissectum (Meadow Thistle)
