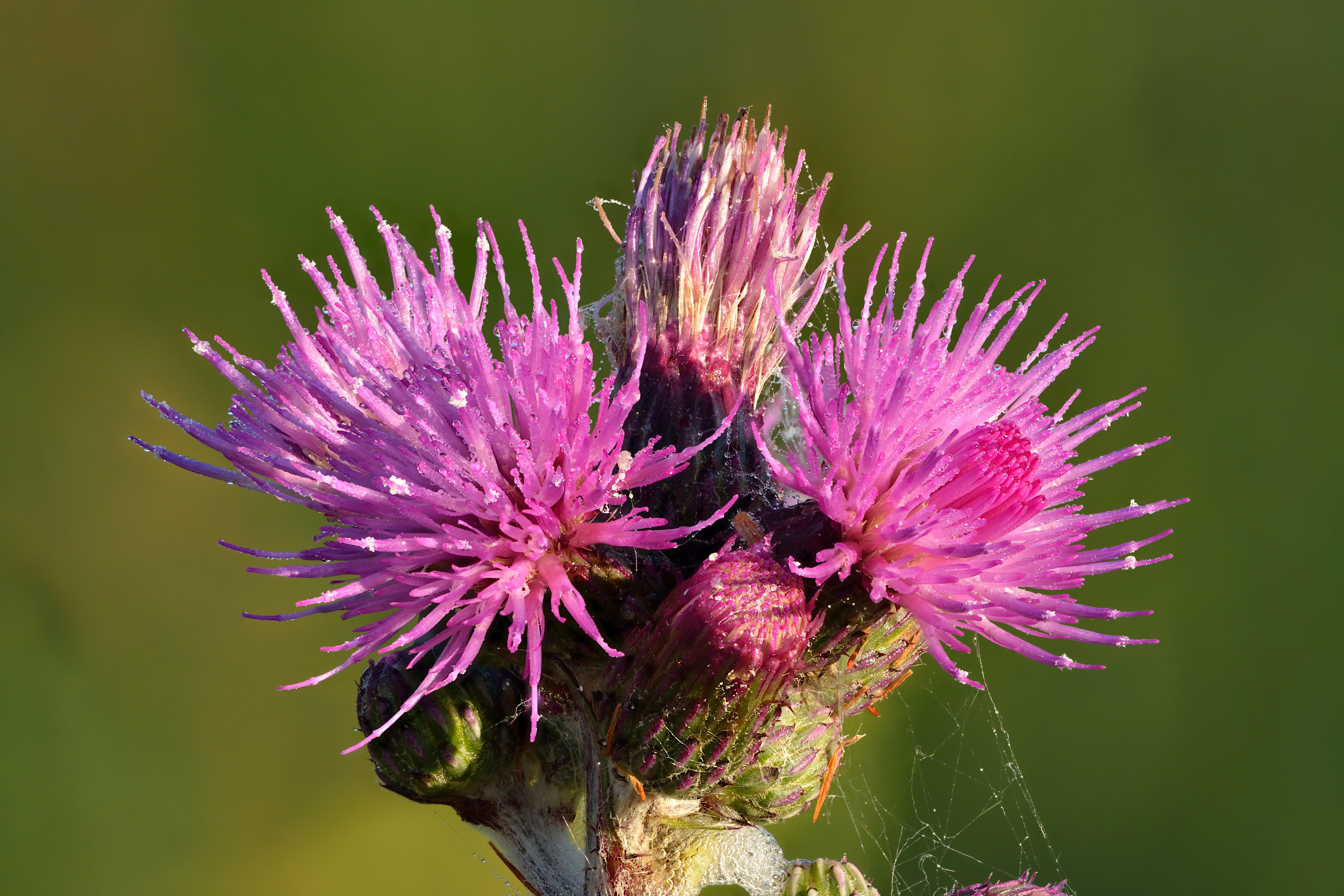

Scientific classification
- Kingdom: Plantae
- Clade: Embryophytes
- Clade: Tracheophytes
- Clade: Spermatophytes
- Clade: Angiosperms
- Clade: Eudicots
- Clade: Asterids
- Order: Asterales
- Family: Asteraceae
- Genus: Cirsium
- Species: C. palustre

Binomial name
- Cirsium palustre (L.) Scop.

Synonyms
- Selected synonyms: Carduus chailleti Godr.; Carduus laciniatus Lam.; Carduus palustris L.; Cirsium chailletii Gaudin; Cirsium kochianum Loehr; Cirsium laciniatum Nyman; Cirsium lacteum Schleich. ex W.Koch; Cirsium palatinum Sch.Bip. ex Nyman; Cirsium parviflorum Lange ex Nyman; Cnicus palustris (L.) Willd.; Cynara palustris Stokes

= Cirsium palustre =

Species of flowering plant in the daisy family

Cirsium palustre, the marsh thistle or European swamp thistle, is a herbaceous biennial (or often perennial) flowering plant in the family Asteraceae.

== Description ==
Cirsium palustre is a tall thistle which reaches up to 2 metres (7 ft) in height. The strong stems have few branches and are covered in small spines. In its first year the plant grows as a dense rosette, at first with narrow, entire leaves with spiny, dark purple edges; later, larger leaves are lobed. In the subsequent years the plant grows a tall, straight stem, the tip of which branches repeatedly, bearing a candelabra of dark purple flowers, 10–20 millimetres (0.4–0.8 in) with purple-tipped bracts. In the northern hemisphere these are produced from June to September. The flowers are occasionally white, in which case the purple edges to the leaves are absent.

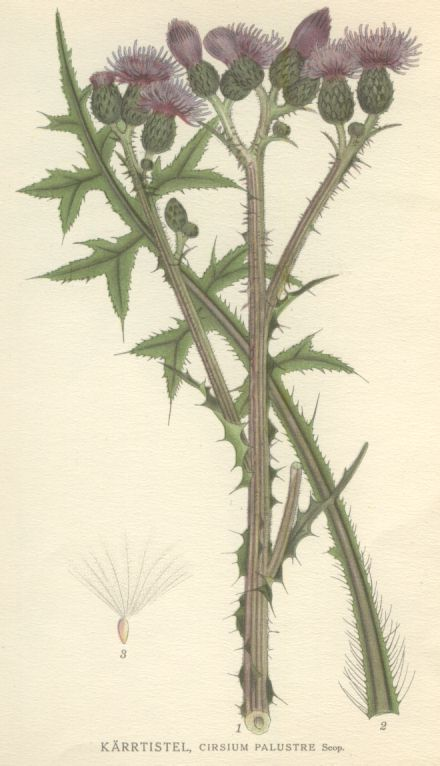
llustration

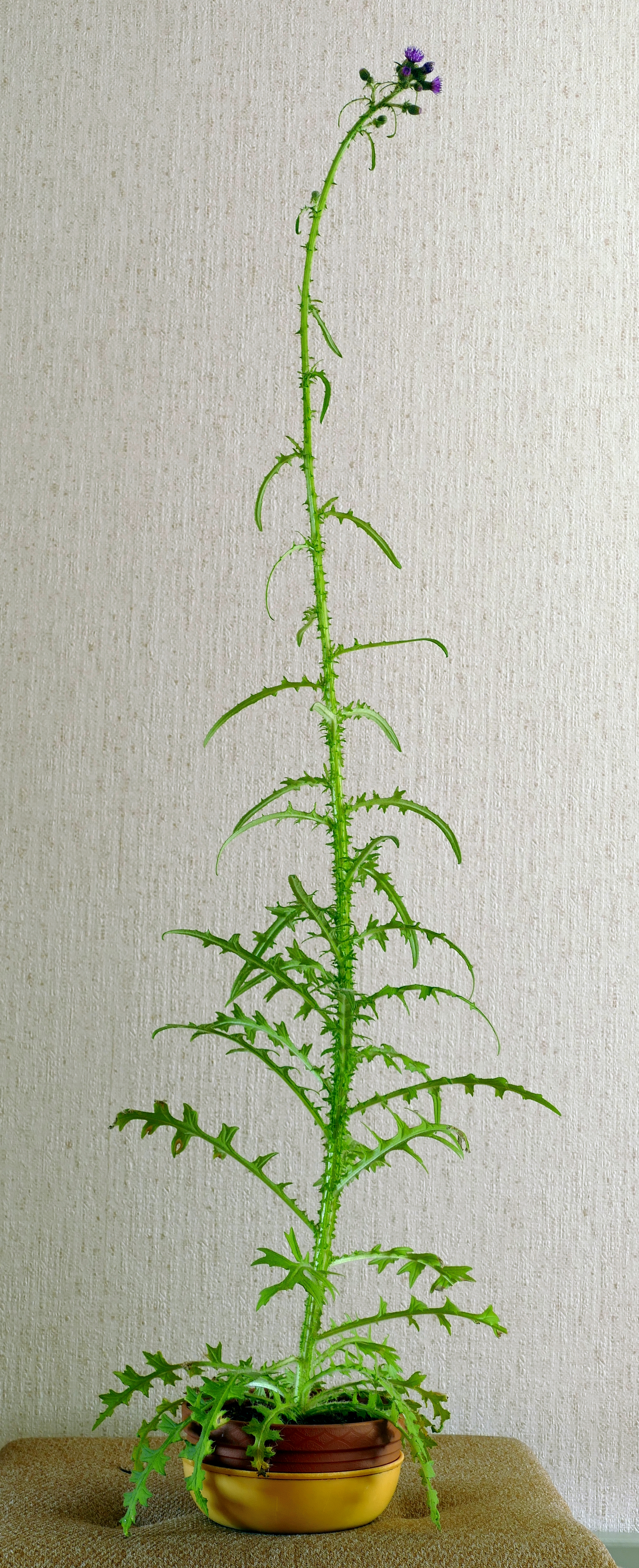
As a pot plant

== Ecology ==
The plant provides a great deal of nectar for pollinators. It was rated first out of the top 10 for most nectar production (nectar per unit cover per year) in a UK plants survey conducted by the AgriLand project which is supported by the UK Insect Pollinators Initiative.

It is native to Europe where it is particularly common on damp ground such as marshes, wet fields, moorland and beside streams. In Canada and the northern United States, it is an introduced species that has become invasive. It grows in dense thickets that can crowd out slower growing native plants.

Cirsium palustre is broadly distributed throughout much of Europe and eastward to central Asia. This thistle's occurrence is linked to the spread of human agriculture from the mid-Holocene era or before. It is a constant plant of several fen-meadow plant associations, including the Juncus subnodulosus-Cirsium palustre fen-meadow. The flowers are visited by a wide variety of insects, featuring a generalised pollination syndrome.
