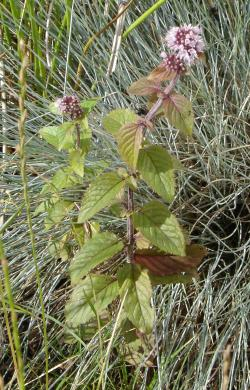
- Plant in flower

Conservation status
- Least Concern (IUCN 3.1)

Scientific classification
- Kingdom: Plantae
- Clade: Tracheophytes
- Clade: Angiosperms
- Clade: Eudicots
- Clade: Asterids
- Order: Lamiales
- Family: Lamiaceae
- Genus: Mentha
- Species: M. aquatica

Binomial name
- Mentha aquatica L.

Synonyms
- List: Marrubium aquaticum (L.) Uspensky; Mentha acuta Opiz; Mentha acutata Opiz; Mentha affinis Boreau nom. illeg.; Mentha aromatica Opiz ex Déségl.; Mentha augusta Opiz ex Déségl.; Mentha auneticensis Opiz; Mentha aurita Weihe ex Fresen.; Mentha avellinii Tod. ex Bertol.; Mentha avellinii Tod. ex Lojac.; Mentha brachiata Weihe ex Fresen.; Mentha bugulifolia Weihe ex Fresen.; Mentha calaminthifolia (Vis.) Heinr.Braun; Mentha capitata Opiz; Mentha cetica Heinr.Braun; Mentha chaixii Strail; Mentha cordata Jan ex Nyman; Mentha crenatodentata Strail; Mentha denticulata Strail; Mentha deseglisei Malinv. nom. illeg.; Mentha dubia Chaix ex Vill.; Mentha dunensis Strail; Mentha duriuscula Heinr.Braun & Topitz; Mentha duriuscula (Heinr.Braun & Topitz) Trautm.; Mentha elongata (Pérard) Heinr.Braun; Mentha eriantha K.Koch; Mentha glabra Colla nom. illeg.; Mentha glomerata Stokes; Mentha grandidentata Strail; Mentha hirsuta Huds.; Mentha hirta Caldas nom. illeg.; Mentha hybrida Aresch.; Mentha hygrophila Topitz; Mentha hystrix Heinr.Braun; Mentha incisoserrata Strail; Mentha intermedia Host nom. illeg.; Mentha × intricata Debeaux; Mentha lateovata Strail; Mentha latifolia Nolte ex Hornem. nom. illeg.; Mentha limicola Strail; Mentha limnetes (Topitz) Trautm.; Mentha limosa (Schur) Heinr.Braun; Mentha littoralis Strail; Mentha lloydii Boreau; Mentha lobeliana (Becker) Heinr.Braun; Mentha macrocephala Strail; Mentha macrophylla Waisb. ex Trautm. nom. illeg.; Mentha microcephala Strail; Mentha nederheimensis Strail; Mentha nepetifolia Lej.; Mentha nigrescens Weihe ex Fresen.; Mentha obliqua Raf.; Mentha obtuseserrata Opiz ex Malinv.; Mentha obtusifolia Opiz ex Déségl.; Mentha origanoides Ten.; Mentha origanoides Lej. ex Fingerh. nom. illeg.; Mentha ortmanniana Opiz; Mentha paludosa Sole; Mentha palustris Mill.; Mentha pedunculata (Pers.) Poir.; Mentha pireana Strail; Mentha polyanthetica (Topitz) Trautm.; Mentha probabilis Schur; Mentha purpurea Host; Mentha pyrifolia Heinr.Braun; Mentha pyrifolia A.Kern. nom. illeg.; Mentha ramosissima Strail; Mentha ranina Opiz; Mentha rauscheri Topitz; Mentha riparia Schreb.; Mentha riparia Lej. ex Malinv. nom. illeg.; Mentha rudaeana Opiz; Mentha sativa Sm. nom. illeg.; Mentha soleana Strail; Mentha stagnalis Topitz; Mentha stagnalis (Topitz) Trautm.; Mentha stolonifera Opiz; Mentha subspicata Weihe ex Fresen.; Mentha subthermalis Trautm.; Mentha tinantiana Lej. ex Malinv.; Mentha trojana Heinr.Braun; Mentha umbrosa Opiz; Mentha urticifolia Ten.; Mentha viennensis Opiz; Mentha weiheana Opiz; Mentha weissenburgensis F.W.Schultz ex Nyman nom. inval.

= Mentha aquatica =

Species of flowering plant

Mentha aquatica (water mint; syn. Mentha hirsuta Huds.) is a perennial flowering plant in the mint family, Lamiaceae. It grows in moist places and is native to much of Europe, northwest Africa and southwest Asia.

== Description ==
Water mint is a herbaceous rhizomatous perennial plant growing to 90 centimetres (35 in) tall. The stems are square in cross section, green or purple, and variably hairy to almost hairless. The rhizomes are wide-spreading, fleshy, and bear fibrous roots. The leaves are ovate to ovate-lanceolate, 2 to 6 centimetres (0.79 to 2.36 in) long and 1 to 4 centimetres (0.39 to 1.57 in) broad, green (sometimes purplish), opposite, toothed, and vary from hairy to nearly hairless. The flowers of the watermint are tiny, densely crowded, purple (pinkish to lilac), tubular and form a terminal hemispherical inflorescence; flowering is from mid to late summer. Water mint is visited by many types of insects, and can be characterized by a generalized pollination syndrome, but can also spread by underground rhizomes. All parts of the plant have a distinctly minty smell. Unbranched, hairless plants, with narrower leaves and paler flowers, native to areas of Sweden and Finland near the Baltic Sea, have been called Mentha aquatica var. litoralis.

Mentha aquatica is a polyploid, with 2n = 8x = 96 chromosomes.

== Taxonomy ==
Mentha aquatica was first described by Carl Linnaeus in 1753. As with other Mentha species, it was subsequently re-described under a variety of different names; as of July 2019, Plants of the World Online listed 87 synonyms, including four forms or varieties that it does not recognize. The cultivated eau de Cologne mint (also known as bergamot mint) is considered to be a variety of this species.

It hybridises with Mentha spicata (spearmint) to produce Mentha × piperita (peppermint), a sterile hybrid; with Mentha suaveolens (apple mint) to produce Mentha × suavis; with Mentha arvensis (corn mint) to produce Mentha × verticillata; and with both M. arvensis and M. spicata to give the tri-species hybrid Mentha × smithiana.

== Distribution and habitat ==
Water mint is native to much of Europe, northern Africa and western Asia. It has been introduced to North and South America, Australia and some Atlantic islands.

As the name suggests, water mint occurs in the shallow margins and channels of streams, rivers, pools, dikes, ditches, canals, wet meadows, marshes and fens. If the plant grows in the water itself, it rises above the surface of the water. It generally occurs on mildly acidic to calcareous (it is common on soft limestone) mineral or peaty soils. M. aquatica can occur in certain fen-meadow habitats such as the Juncus subnodulosus–Cirsium palustre plant association. It is a component of purple moor grass and rush pastures – a type of Biodiversity ActPlan habitat in the UK.

== Uses ==
It can be used as an edible herb (like spearmint or peppermint) and to make a herbal tea. The cultivated variety known as eau de Cologne mint or bergamot mint is used to produce mentha citrata oil, also known as bergamot mint oil, an ingredient used in perfumery (not to be confused with bergamot essential oil).

== Image gallery ==
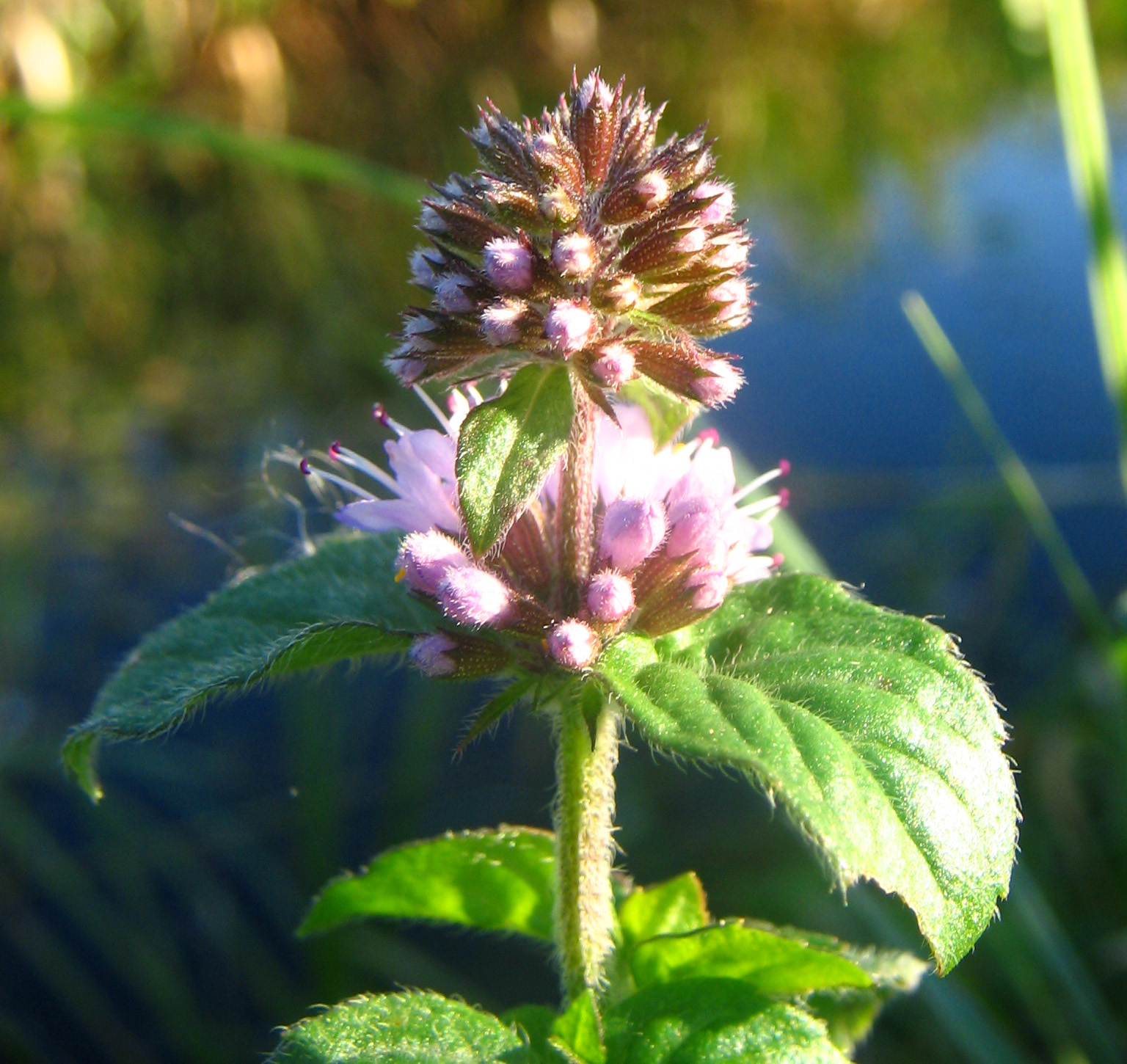
corolla mauve, leaves opposite

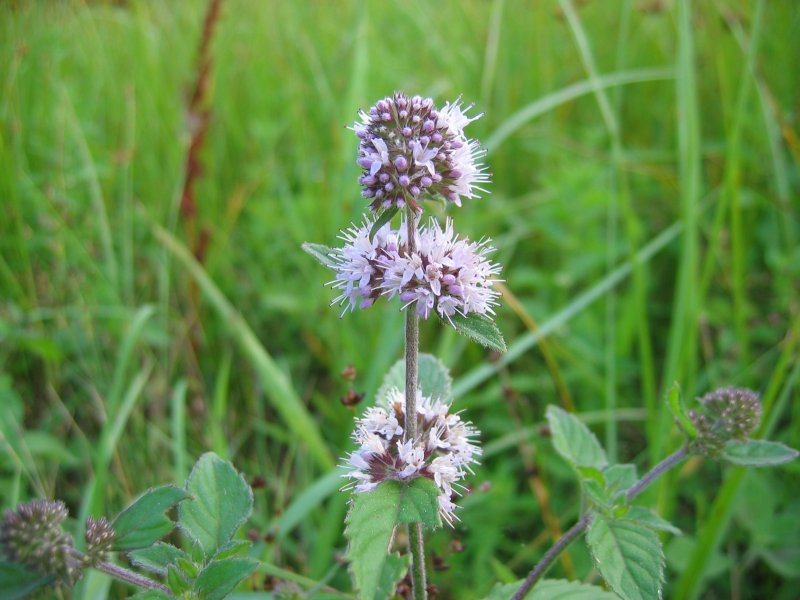

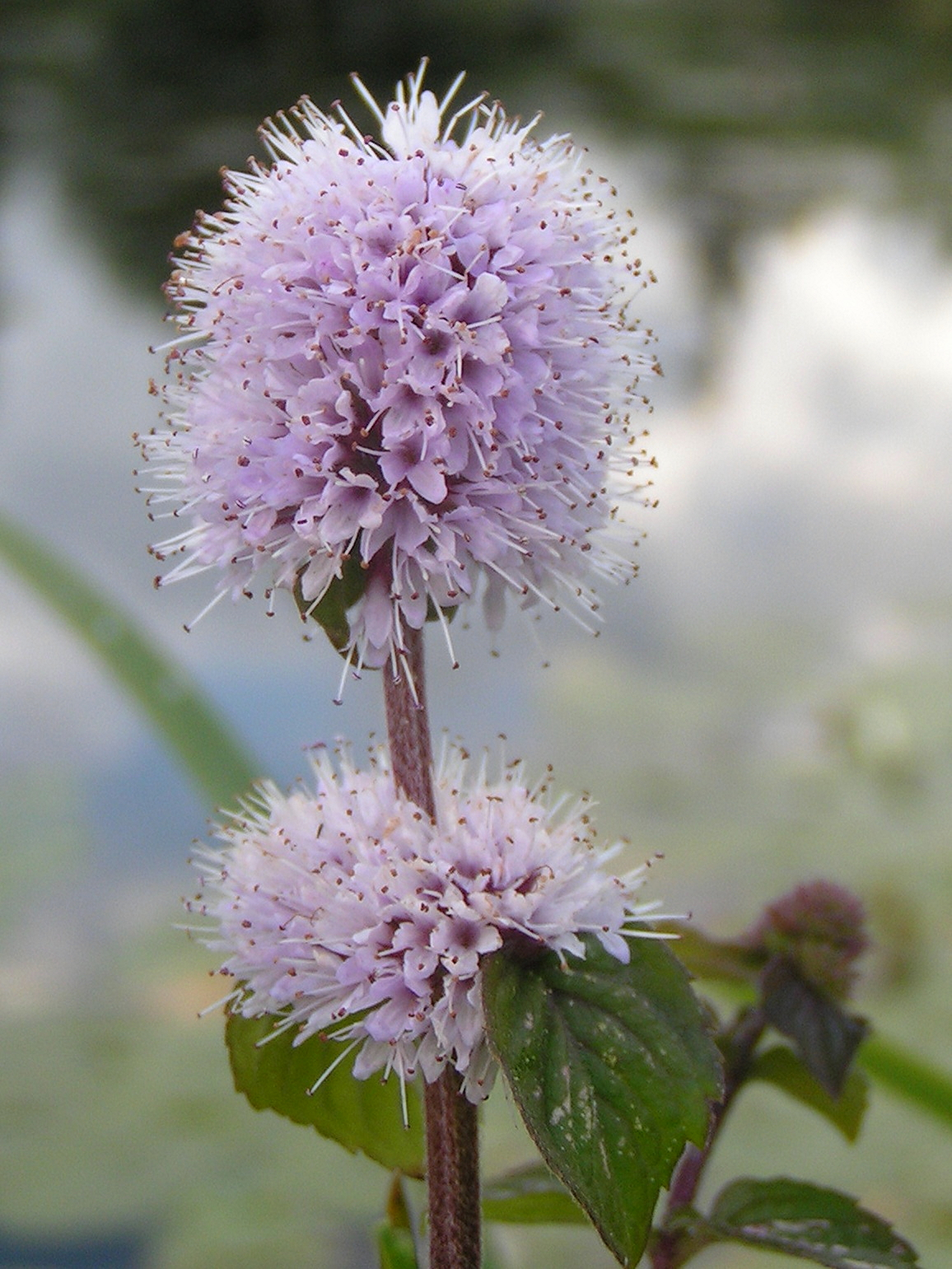

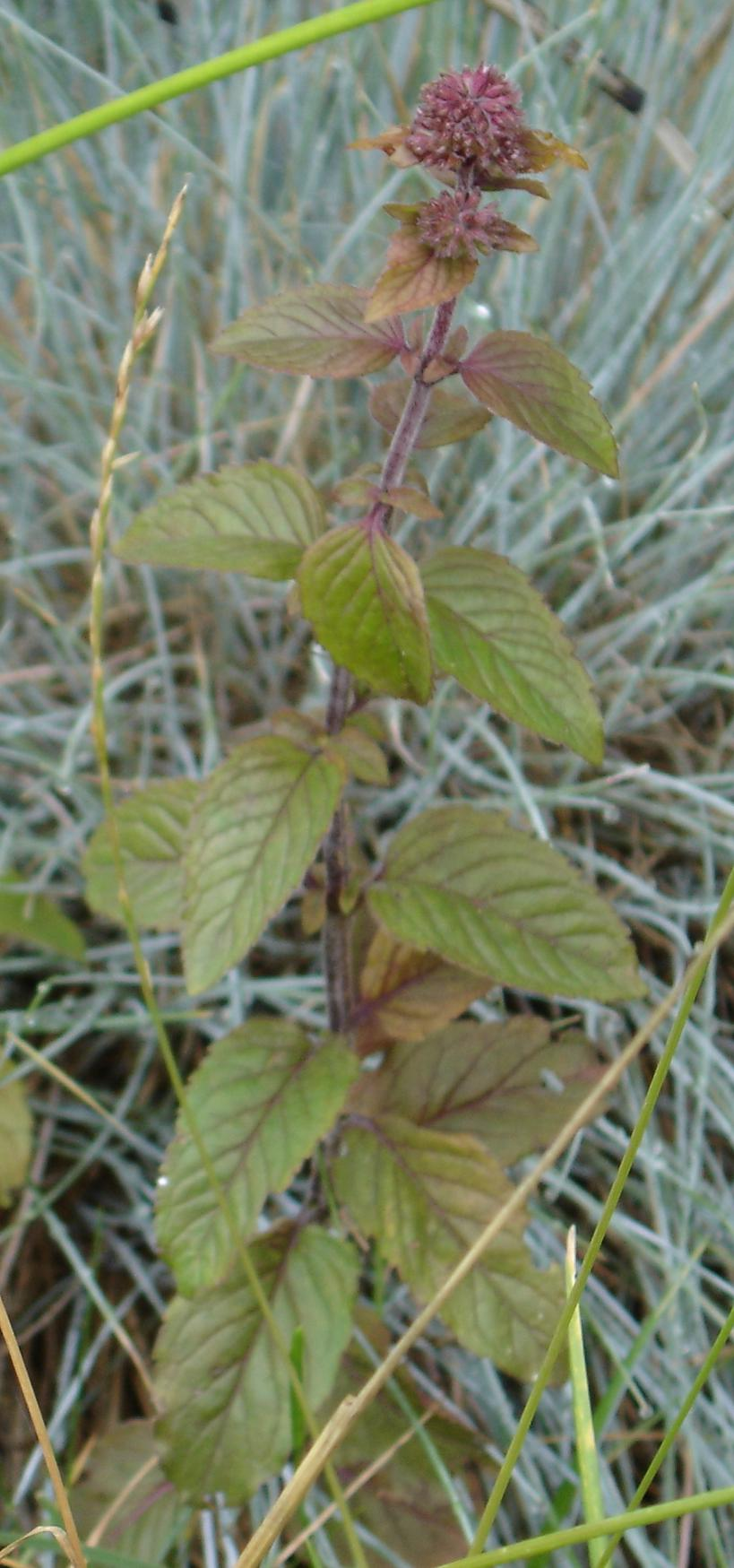

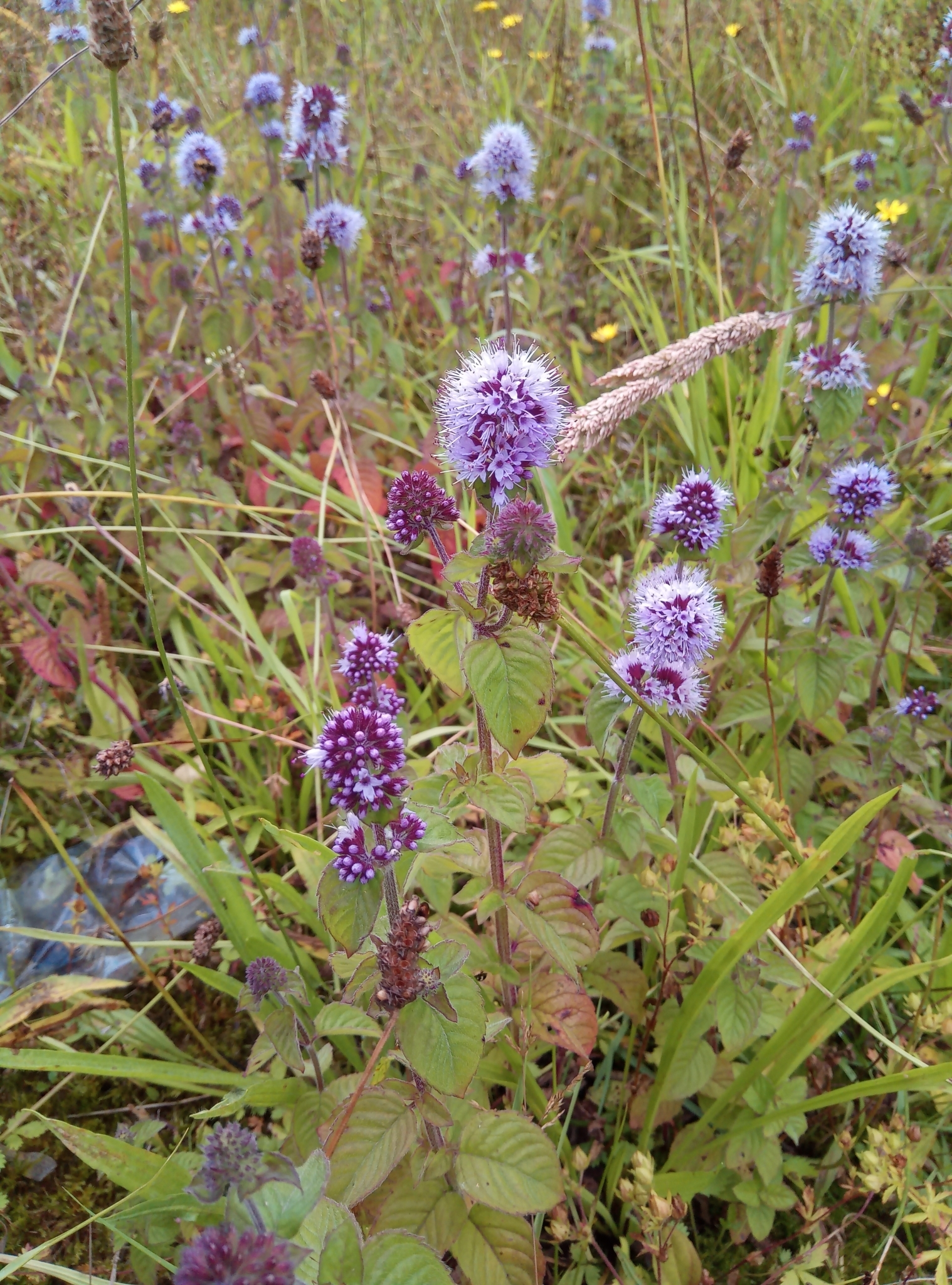

== See also ==
- Peppermint
- Spearmint
