= British NVC community M20 =

UK plant community type

NVC community M20 (Eriophorum vaginatum raised and blanket mire) is one of the mire communities in the British National Vegetation Classification system.

It is a comparatively localised community. There are two subcommunities.

== Community composition ==
Two constant species, Common Cottongrass (Eriophorum angustifolium) and Hare's-tail Cottongrass (Eriophorum vaginatum), are found in this community.

No rare species are associated with the community.

== Distribution ==
This community is found throughout northern England. It is extensive in the southern Pennines, but more local elsewhere. It is also found locally in eastern Scotland and south Wales. It is mainly found within tracts of upland blanket bog, but also locally on raised bogs.

== Subcommunities ==
There are two subcommunities:

- the so-called Species-poor subcommunity
- the Calluna vulgaris - Cladonia spp. subcommunity
