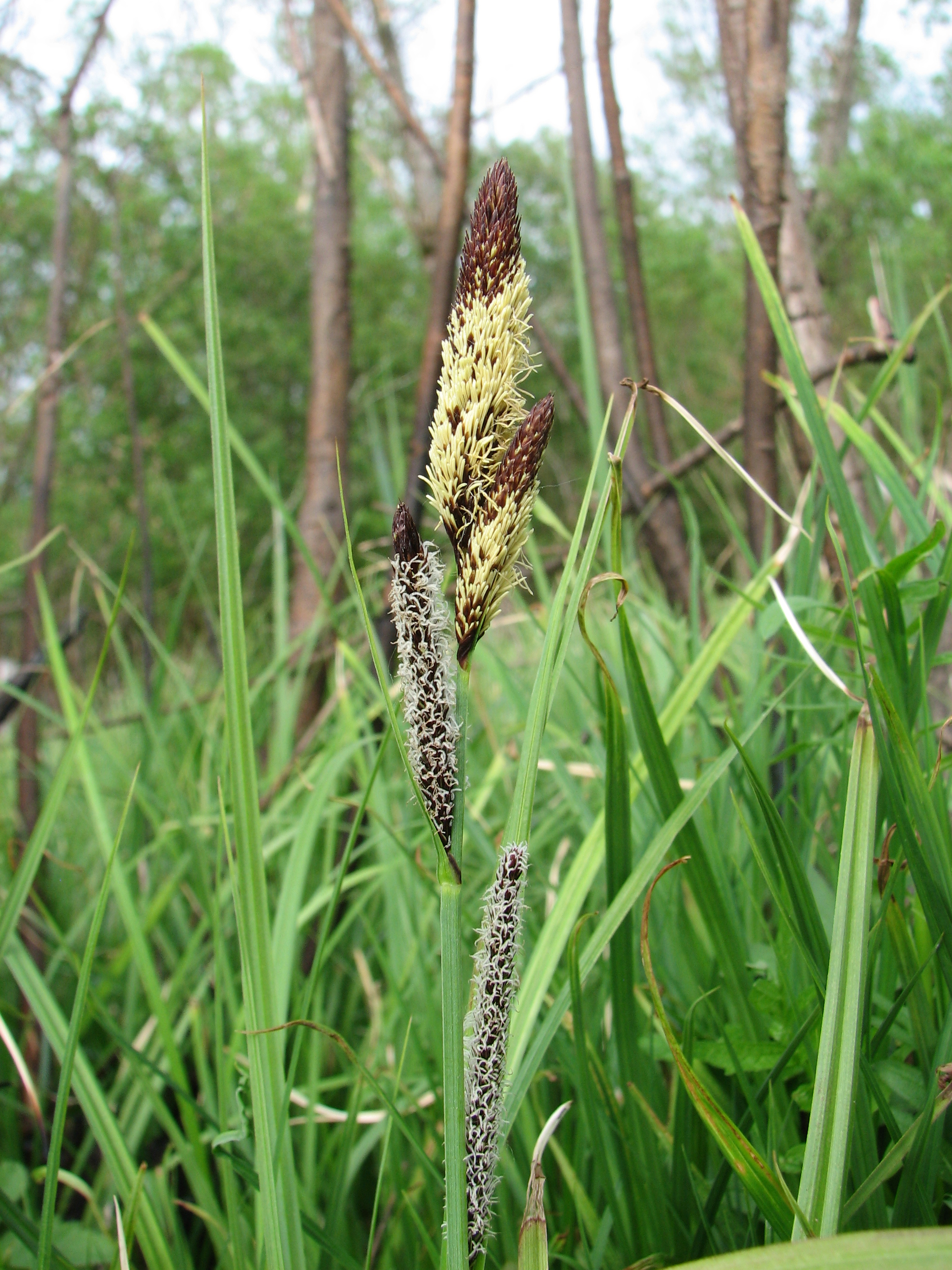

Conservation status
- Least Concern (IUCN 3.1)

Scientific classification
- Kingdom: Plantae
- Clade: Tracheophytes
- Clade: Angiosperms
- Clade: Monocots
- Clade: Commelinids
- Order: Poales
- Family: Cyperaceae
- Genus: Carex
- Species: C. acutiformis

Binomial name
- Carex acutiformis Ehrh.

= Carex acutiformis =

Species of grass-like plant in the sedge family

Carex acutiformis, the lesser pond-sedge, is a species of plant in the Carex, or sedge family.

== Description ==
Carex acutiformis is a tuft-forming, rhizomatous plant growing up to 150 centimetres (59 in) tall. Stems are slender and three angled. Leaves are narrow, with a tendency to droop at the tips, and measuring up to 160 cm (63 in) long and 5–20 mm (0.2–0.8 in) wide. Inflorescence consists of 2 to 3 male and 3 to 4 female spikelets. Male spikelets measure 1 to 4 cm, and are generally purple-brown in colour. Female spikelets measure between 2 and 5 cm, and are cylindrical in shape, erect and short-stalked.

== Ecology ==
It is native to parts of northern and western Europe , where it grows in moist spots in a number of habitat types. In its native European range this species is often associated with the Juncus subnodulosus–Cirsium palustre fen-meadow habitat. It is also a dominant plant in the Carex acutiformis swamp plant association.
