= British NVC community M3 =

UK plant community type

NVC community M3 (Eriophorum angustifolium bog pool community) is one of the mire plant communities in the British National Vegetation Classification system.

It is a localised community of northern Britain. There are no subcommunities.

== Community composition ==
The following constant species is found in this community:

- Common Cottongrass (Eriophorum angustifolium)

No rare species are associated with the community.

== Distribution ==
This community is found in various locations in northern England, on Lewis in the Outer Hebrides, and in a site in Wales.
