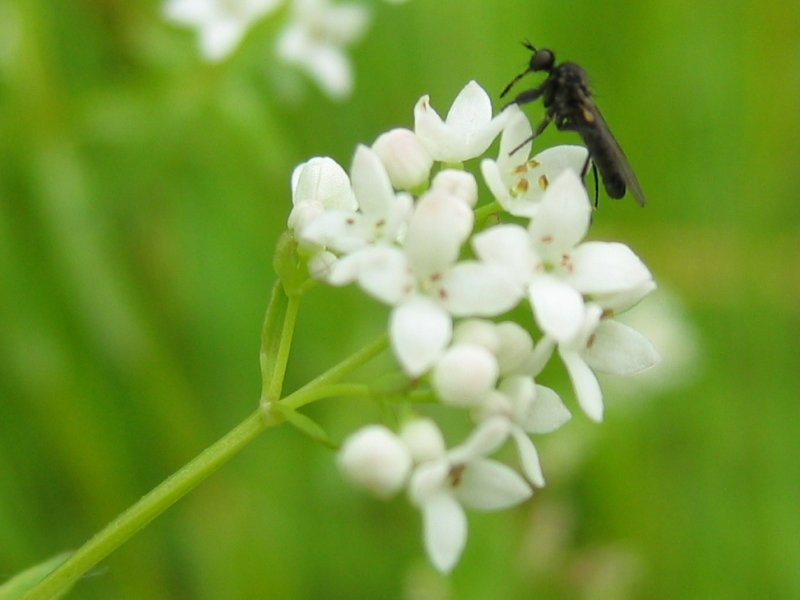

Scientific classification
- Kingdom: Plantae
- Clade: Tracheophytes
- Clade: Angiosperms
- Clade: Eudicots
- Clade: Asterids
- Order: Gentianales
- Family: Rubiaceae
- Genus: Galium
- Species: G. palustre

Binomial name
- Galium palustre L.

= Galium palustre =

Marsh bedstraw

Species of plant

Galium palustre, the common marsh bedstraw or simply marsh-bedstraw, is a herbaceous annual plant of the family Rubiaceae. This plant is widely distributed, native to virtually every country in Europe, plus Morocco, the Azores, Turkey, Turkmenistan, Western Siberia, Greenland, eastern Canada, Saint Pierre and Miquelon, and parts of the United States (primarily the Michigan and the Northeast, but with isolated populations in Tennessee, Montana, Washington and Oregon). The species is classified as a noxious weed in New York, Pennsylvania, Massachusetts, Connecticut, Vermont and New Hampshire. It is considered naturalized in Kamchatka, Australia, New Zealand and Argentina.

== Ecology ==
In Britain, Galium palustre is part of the British NVC Community M23 (Juncus effusus/acutiflorus – Galium palustre rush-pasture). It is a component of Purple moor grass and rush pastures - a type of Biodiversity Action Plan habitat in the UK. It occurs on poorly drained neutral and acidic soils of the lowlands and upland fringe. It is found in the South West of England, especially in Devon.

== Gallery ==
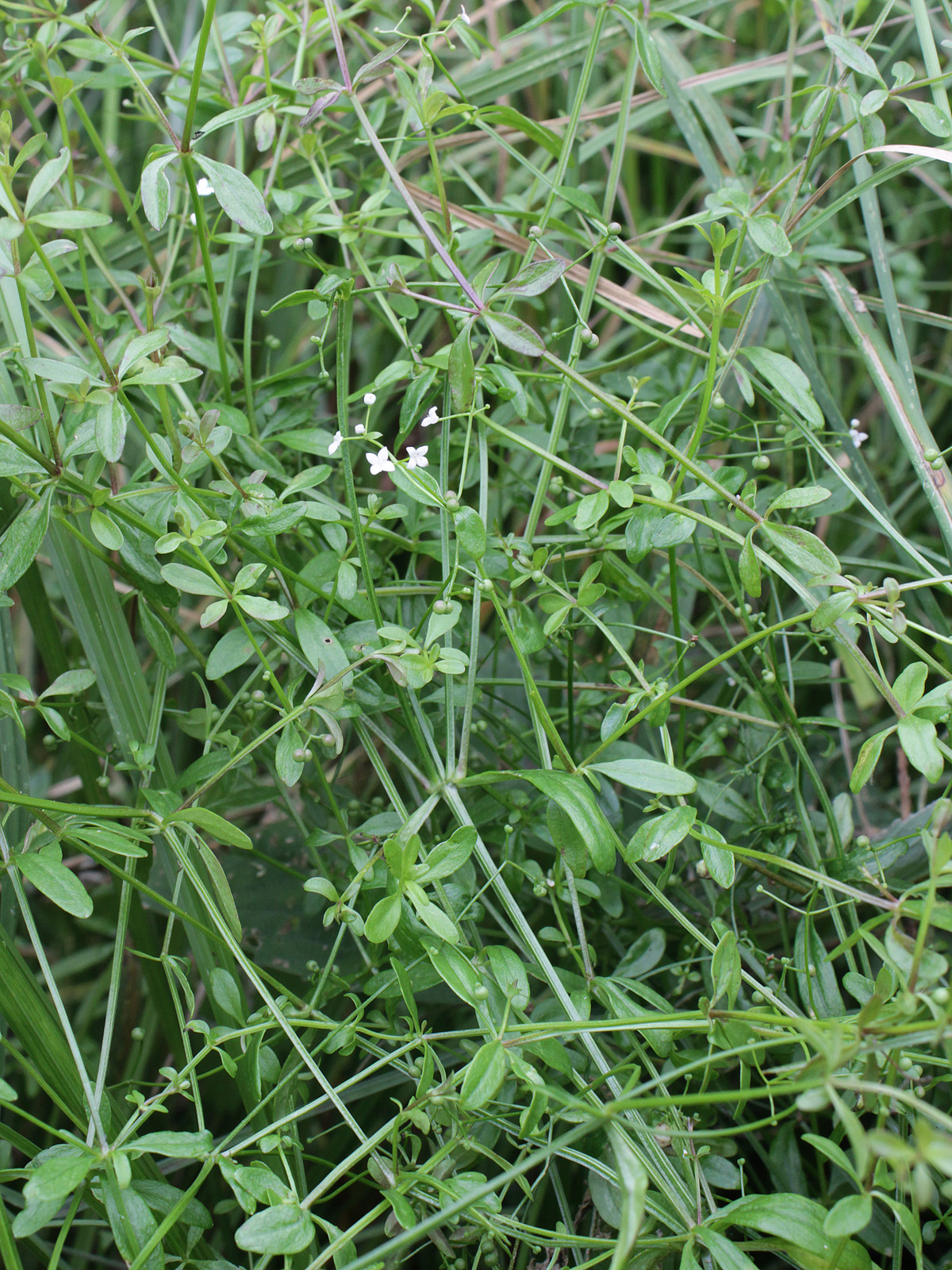

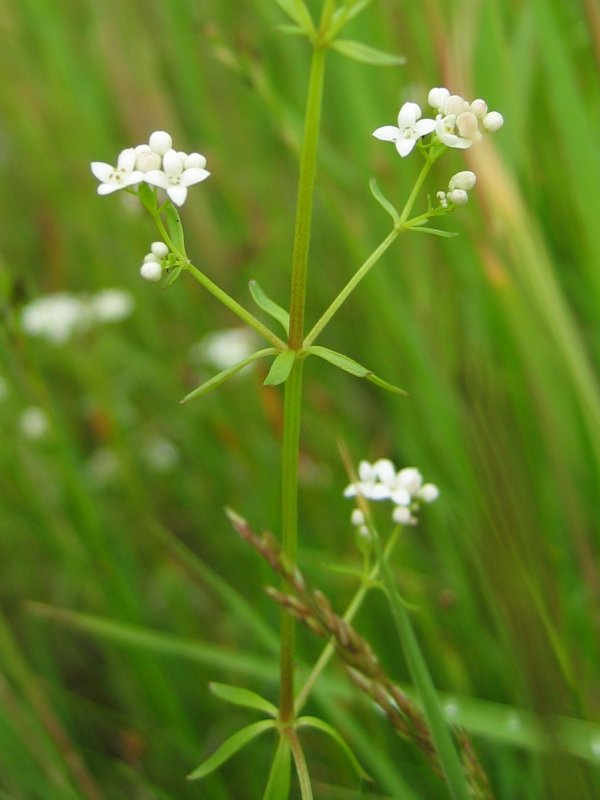

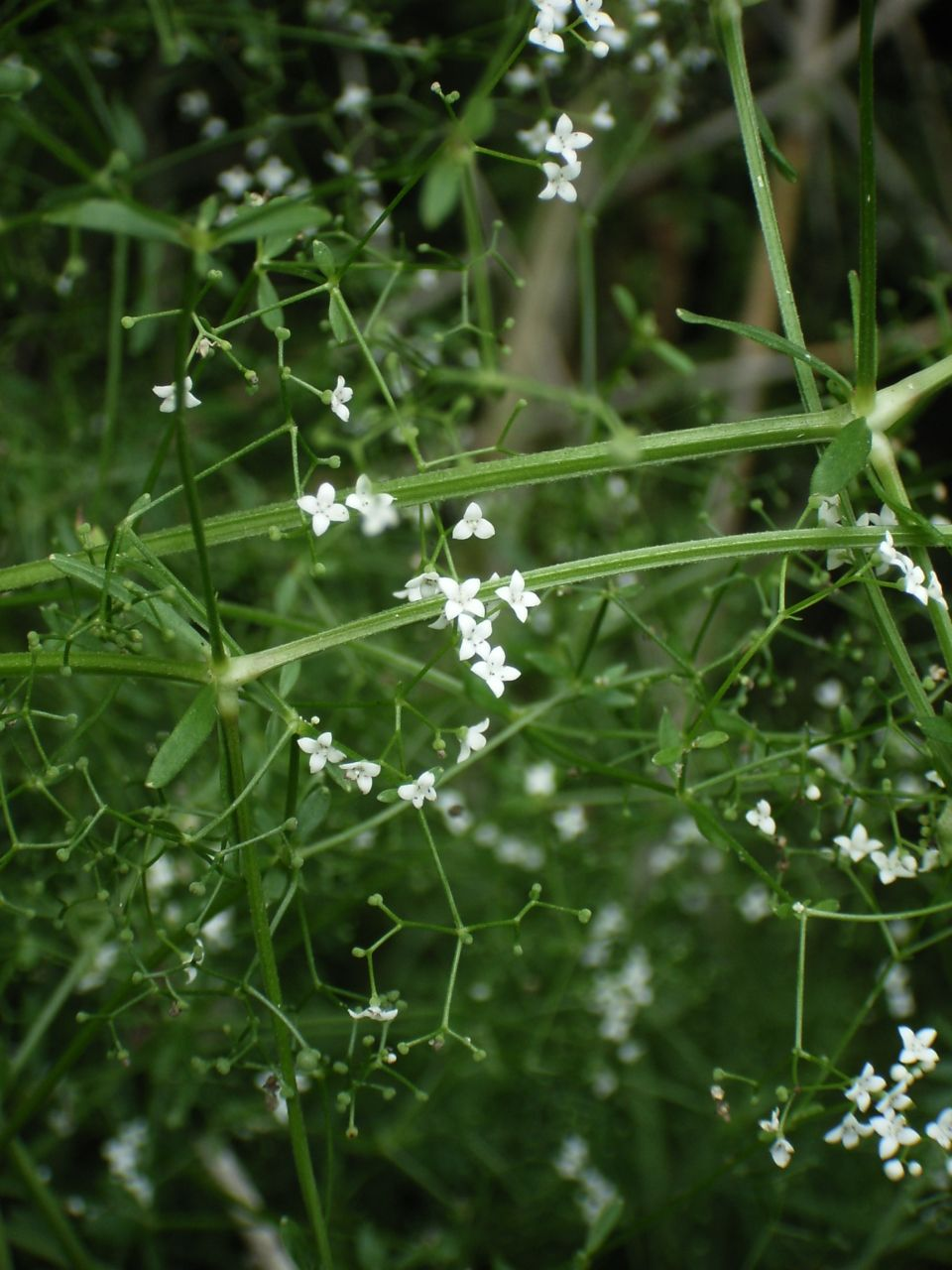
