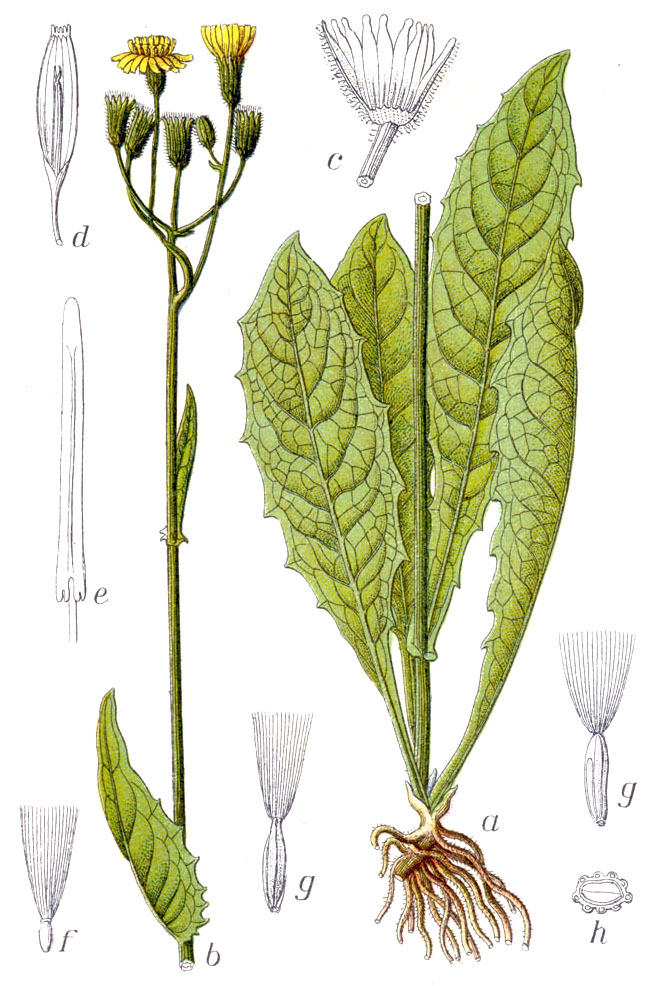
- 1796 illustration

Scientific classification
- Kingdom: Plantae
- Clade: Embryophytes
- Clade: Tracheophytes
- Clade: Spermatophytes
- Clade: Angiosperms
- Clade: Eudicots
- Clade: Asterids
- Order: Asterales
- Family: Asteraceae
- Genus: Crepis
- Species: C. paludosa

Binomial name
- Crepis paludosa (L.) Moench

Synonyms
- Synonymy: Aracium attenuatum Domin; Aracium paludosum (L.) Dulac; Aracium paludosum Monnier; Barkhausia paludosa Baumg. ex DC.; Geracium paludosum (L.) Rchb.; Hapalostephium paludosum (L.) D.Don; Hieracioides paludosum (L.) Kuntze; Hieracium paludosum L.; Limnocrepis paludosa (L.) Fourr.; Soyeria paludosa (L.) Godr.

= Crepis paludosa =

Species of flowering plant

Crepis paludosa, the marsh hawk's-beard, is a European species of flowering plant in the tribe Cichorieae of the family Asteraceae. It is widespread across much of Europe with isolated populations in Iceland, the Ural Mountains, and the Caucasus.

This is a perennial. The inflorescence is around 15–25 millimetres (0.6–1.0 in) in diameter. It is sometimes confused with Crepis capillaris. The flower heads are yellow and the flower buds are black.

== Conservation ==
Crepis paludosa is a component of Purple moor grass and rush pastures, a type of Biodiversity Action Plan habitat in the UK. It occurs on poorly drained neutral and acidic soils of the lowlands and upland fringe. It is found in the South West of England, especially in Devon.
