= British NVC community M27 =

UK plant community type

NVC Community M27 (Filipendula ulmaria - Angelica sylvestris mire) is one of the 38 mire communities in the British National Vegetation Classification system.

== Community Composition ==
The following species are found in this community

- Filipendula ulmaria
- Angelica sylvestris
