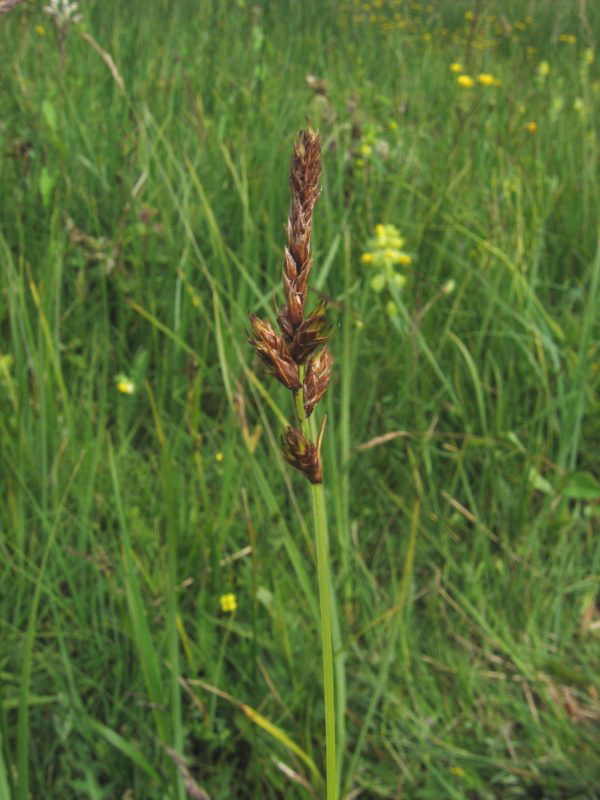

Scientific classification
- Kingdom: Plantae
- Clade: Tracheophytes
- Clade: Angiosperms
- Clade: Monocots
- Clade: Commelinids
- Order: Poales
- Family: Cyperaceae
- Genus: Carex
- Subgenus: Carex subg. Vignea
- Section: Carex sect. Ammoglochin
- Species: C. disticha

Binomial name
- Carex disticha Huds.

= Carex disticha =

Species of grass-like plant

Carex disticha is a Eurasian species of sedge known as the brown sedge or, in North America, tworank sedge.

== Distribution ==
Carex disticha is native to parts of Northern and Western Europe, where it grows in moist spots in a number of habitat types, and it has been introduced to the Great Lakes region of southern Canada. In its native range, this species is often associated with the Juncus subnodulosus–Cirsium palustre fen-meadow habitat. Carex disticha has also been introduced to Canada, where it is known from only two sites, in Ontario and Quebec.
