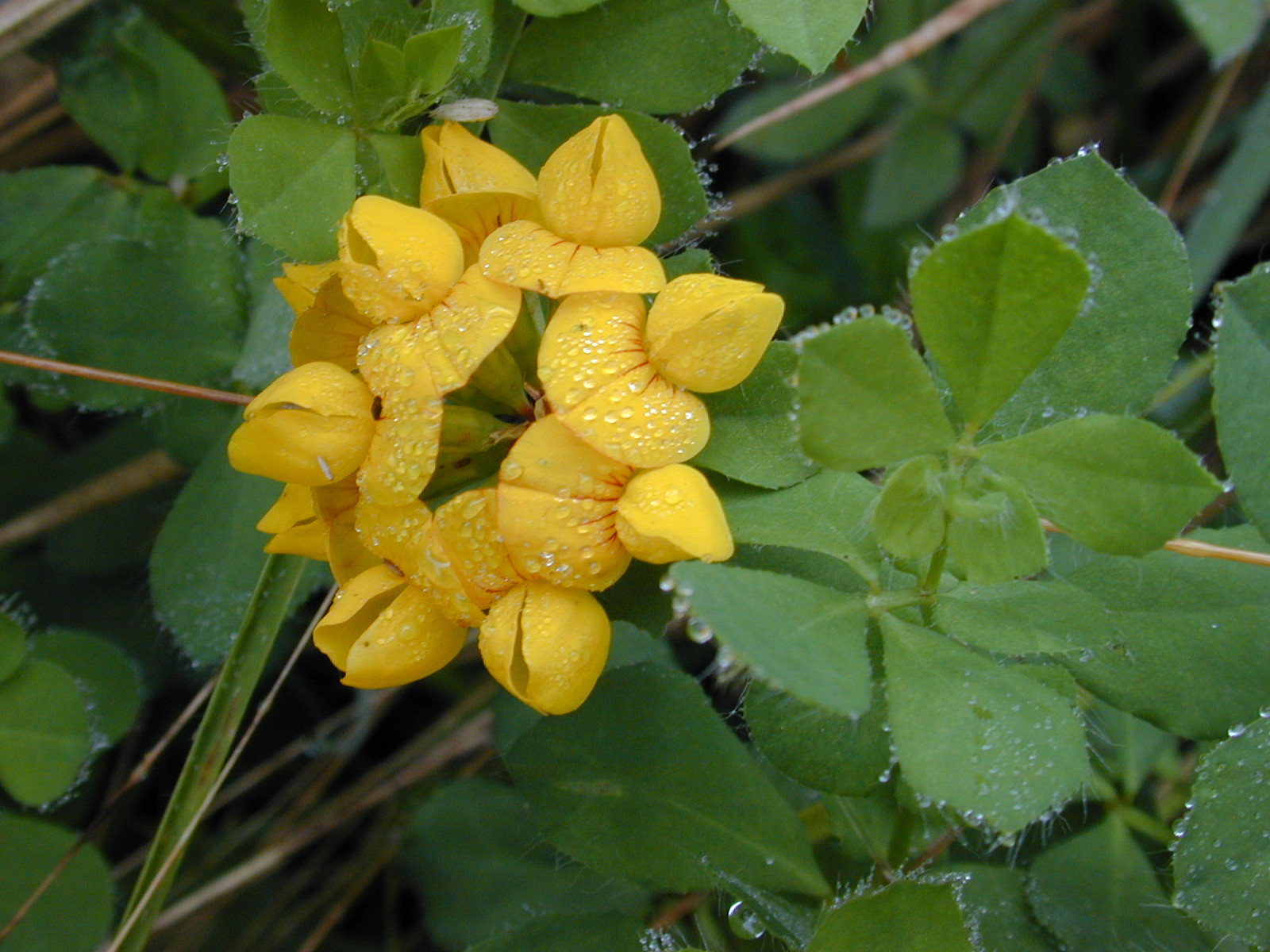

Scientific classification
- Kingdom: Plantae
- Clade: Tracheophytes
- Clade: Angiosperms
- Clade: Eudicots
- Clade: Rosids
- Order: Fabales
- Family: Fabaceae
- Subfamily: Faboideae
- Genus: Lotus
- Species: L. pedunculatus

Binomial name
- Lotus pedunculatus Cav.

Synonyms
- Lotus uliginosus Schkuhr

= Lotus pedunculatus =

Species of legume

Lotus pedunculatus (formerly Lotus uliginosus), the big trefoil, greater bird's-foot-trefoil or marsh bird's-foot trefoil, is a member of the pea family (Fabaceae).

It is a herbaceous perennial growing throughout Europe in damp, open locations. As one common name suggests, it is a larger plant than related Lotus species, growing 20–80 cm (8–30 in) tall, with leaflets 10–25 mm (0.4–1 in) long and 10–20 mm (0.4–0.8 in) broad. Five to twelve golden-yellow flowers 10–18 mm (0.4–0.7 in) long are borne in an umbel at the tip of the upright stem.

Unlike related species, the stem is always hollow, and the sepals turn back at their tips – these sepal tips form a characteristic "green star" at the end of the flower bud. The peak flowering period in the United Kingdom is June and July.

Lotus pedunculatus has been introduced to the western side of the United States and is now a prevalent weed in irrigated lawns and draining waste areas. Due to this it is considered a problem in gardens across the west and as a legume promotes other weed growth as a nitrogen fixer.

Lotus pedunculatus occurs in a wide range of neutral, damp, open habitats, including certain fen-meadow plant associations such as Juncus subnodulosus-Cirsium palustre fen-meadow habitat.

Lotus pedunculatus is also a host plant for ovipositioning of the wood white butterfly, Leptidea sinapis.

== Gallery ==
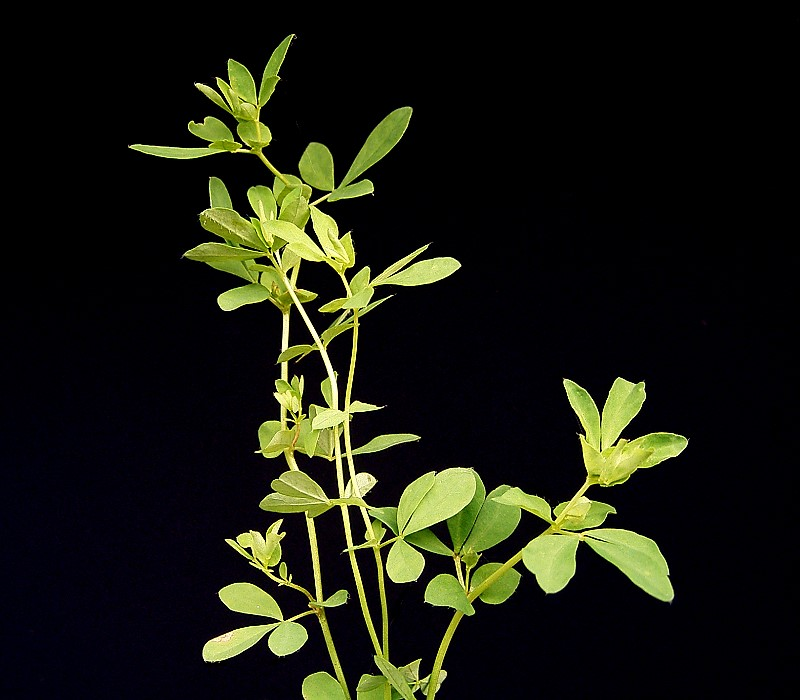

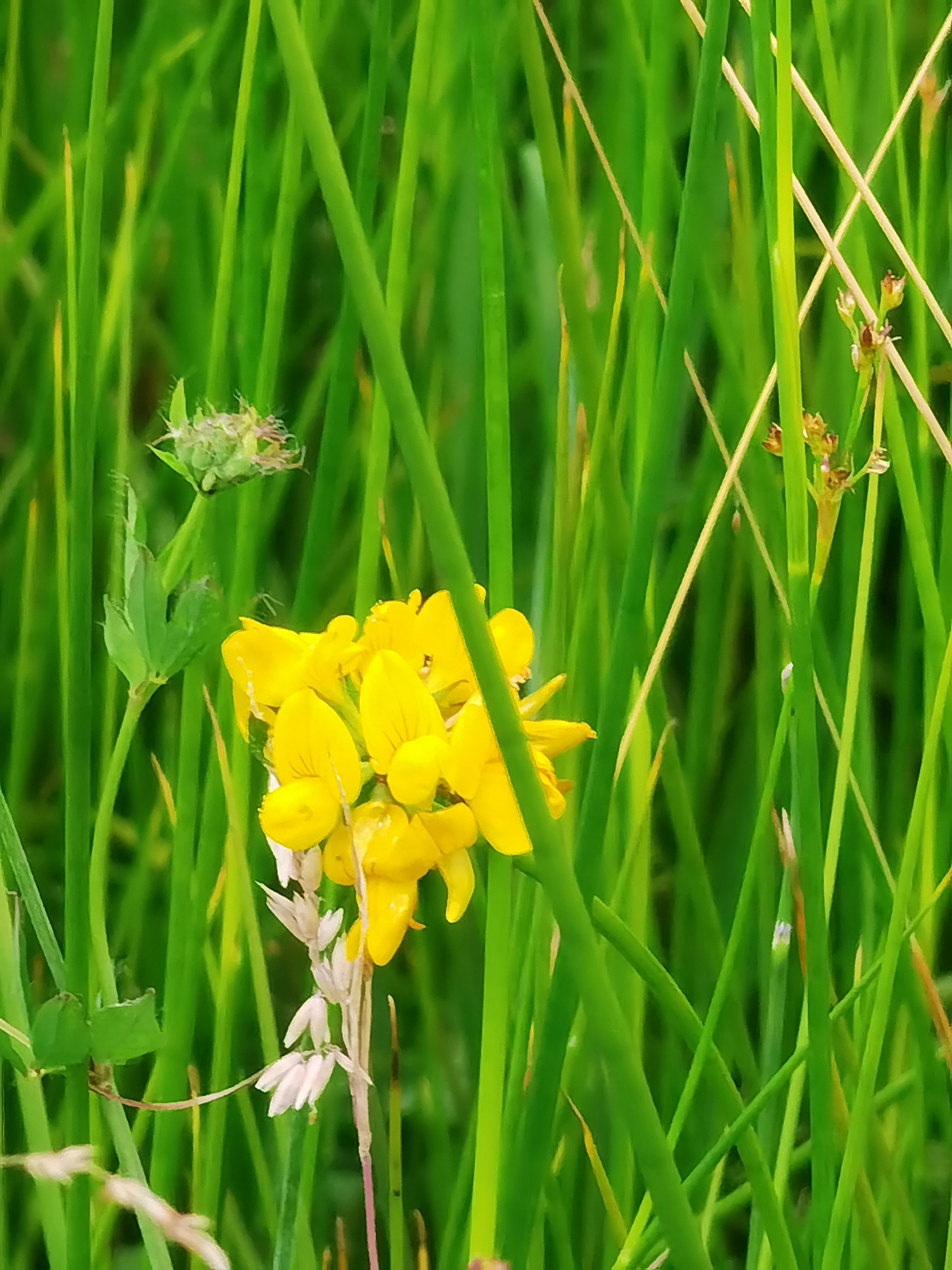
Greater bird's-foot-trefoil at the end of June in the "Belziger Bach" SAC, Brandenburg, Germany
