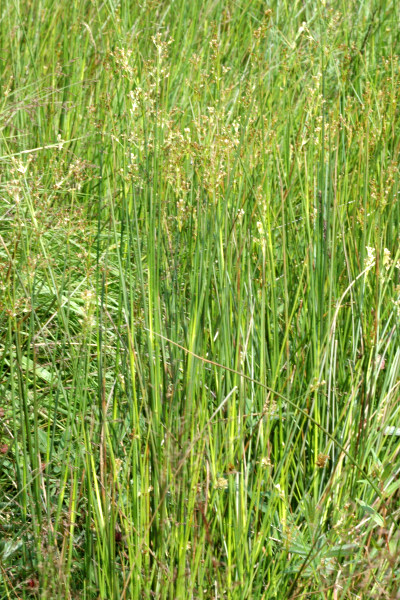

Scientific classification
- Kingdom: Plantae
- Clade: Tracheophytes
- Clade: Angiosperms
- Clade: Monocots
- Clade: Commelinids
- Order: Poales
- Family: Juncaceae
- Genus: Juncus
- Species: J. acutiflorus

Binomial name
- Juncus acutiflorus Ehrh. ex Hoffm., 1791

Synonyms
- Juncus acutiflorus subsp. genuinus; Juncus acutiflorus var. brevirostris

= Juncus acutiflorus =

Species of rush

Juncus acutiflorus, also called sharp-flowered rush, is a rush or a grassy flowering plant in the family Juncaceae. As the name suggests, the plant has notable sharp-looking flowers, flowering between July and September.

== Description ==
The plant has leaves shaped round or elliptical in cross-section, with darker horizontal lines visible against the light at intervals, like in the jointed rush. During pollination, new branches emerge from the old ones and multiply to resemble a small bush. The flowers have various shades of warm brown and maroon. Fruits look like a small pointed capsule. It grows straight and measures about 3 feet tall. The leaves are straight, smooth and circular in section, hollow, with transverse septa making the leaf feel jointed while touching and holding.

== Ecology and habitat ==
The plant commonly grows on acid soils in swampy wetlands and wet heathland and woodlands. This plant is sensitive to nitrate levels in the environment. In a Dutch rich-fen, chlorosis has been noted in stands of Juncus acutiflorus at locations where groundwater containing high levels of nitrate reached the surface. Experiments revealed that the chlorosis could be attributed to iron deficiency although iron levels in the shoots were well above the known physiological threshold values for iron deficiency. Nowadays, nitrate concentrations in ground water as high 1000 μM are no longer an exception in the Netherlands.

=== Similar species ===
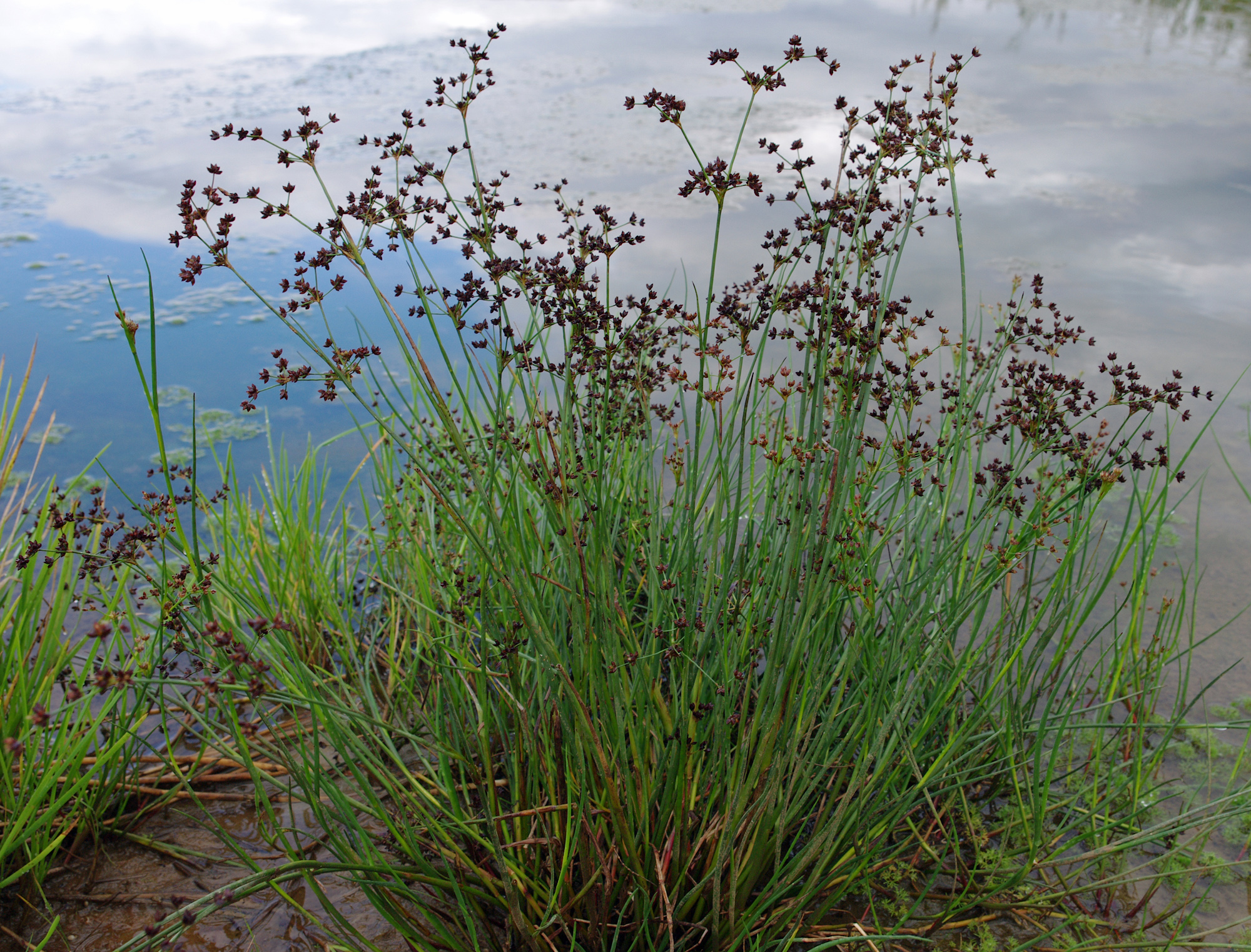
Jointed rush, Juncus articulatus

The species resembles Juncus articulatus (the jointed rush) known by the common names 'jointed rush' and 'jointleaf rush'. It is native to Eurasia and much of Canada and the United States. It grows in moist areas, such as wet sand, and thrives in calcareous soils. This is a perennial herb producing a mainly erect stem from a short rhizome. The stem may root at nodes, and it generally has one or more cylindrical leaves up to 10 centimeters long. It resembles this species as the leaves appear same, but the tepals are completely different. They are almost blackish-brown, and the main branches are often almost horizontal in the jointed rush.

=== Hybrids ===
Two hybrids or subspecies of sharp-flowered rush are known – Juncus acutiflorus subsp. acutiflorus (also called Juncus acutiflorus t.infr. effusus and Juncus acutiflorus var. exoletus) and Juncus acutiflorus ssp. rugosus. They are formed by the hybridization of sharp-flowered rush and the smaller-sized jointed rush.
