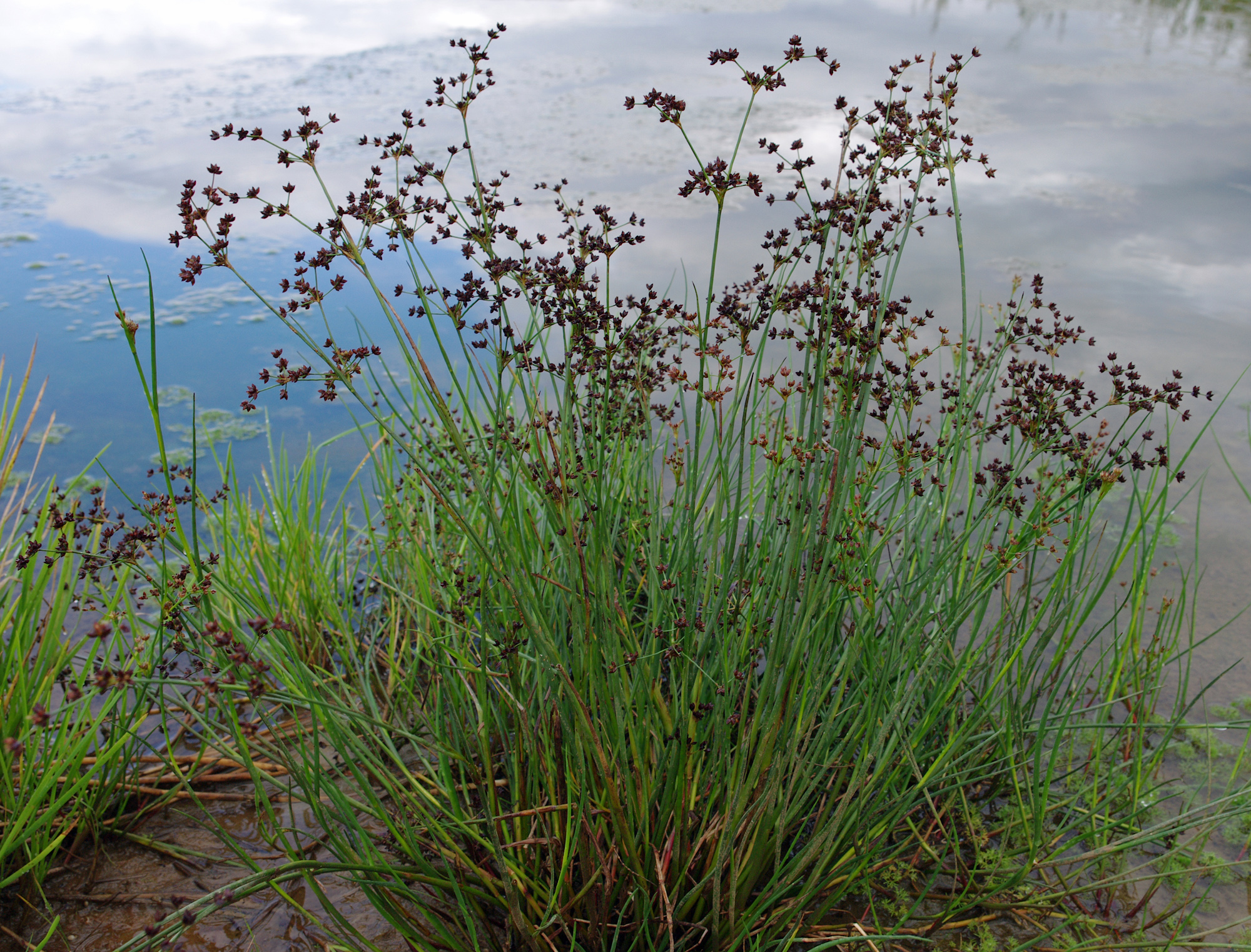

Conservation status
- Least Concern (IUCN 3.1)

Scientific classification
- Kingdom: Plantae
- Clade: Tracheophytes
- Clade: Angiosperms
- Clade: Monocots
- Clade: Commelinids
- Order: Poales
- Family: Juncaceae
- Genus: Juncus
- Species: J. articulatus

Binomial name
- Juncus articulatus L.

Synonyms
- Juncus hylanderi (Hämet-Ahti) Tzvelev & Glazkova; Juncus lamprocarpus Ehrh.

= Juncus articulatus =

Species of grass

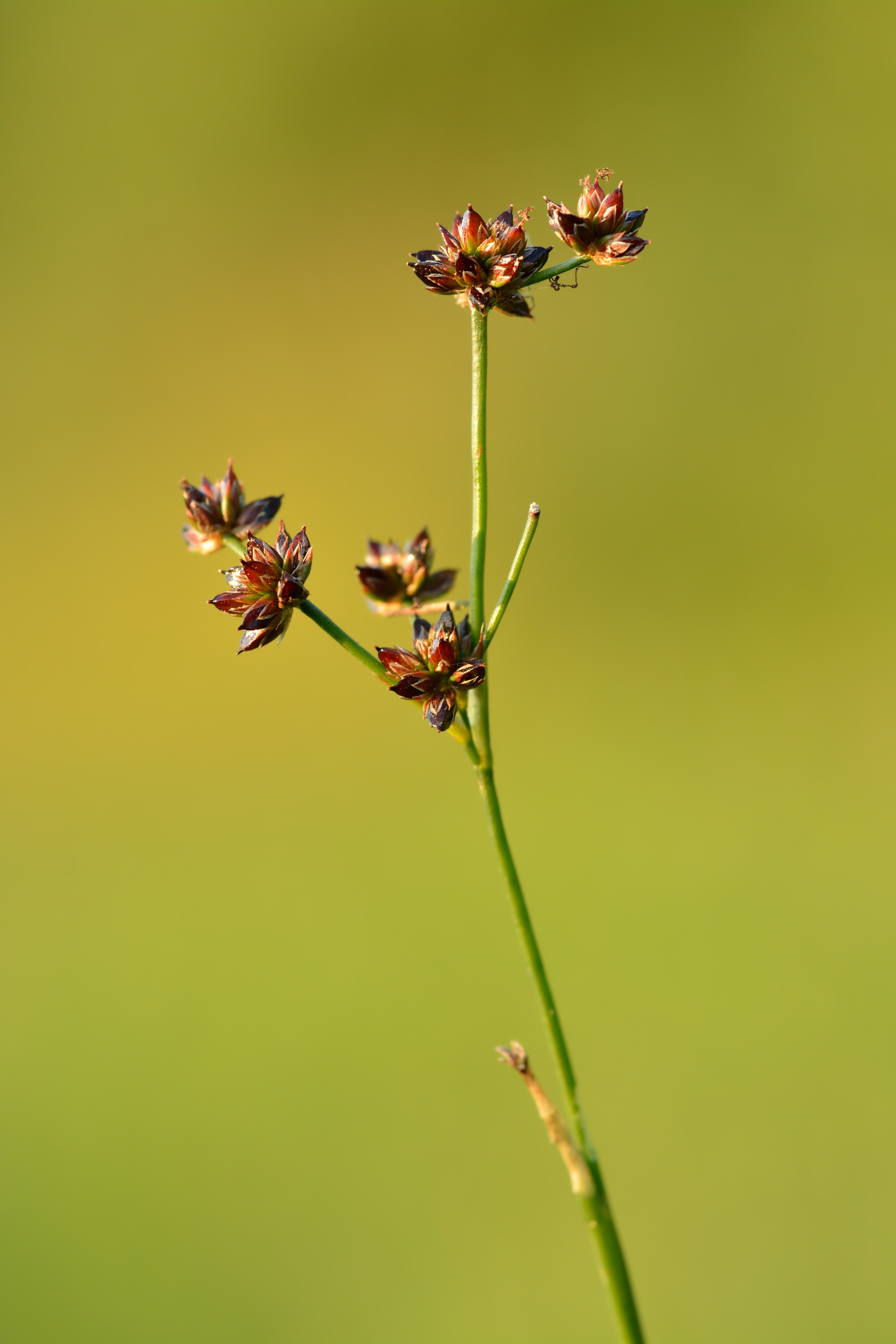

Juncus articulatus is a flowering plant species in the rush family Juncaceae. It is known by the common name jointleaf rush or jointed rush, which can also refer to J. kraussii from Australia. It is native to Eurasia, Canada, Greenland and much of the United States. It grows in moist areas, such as wet sand, and thrives in calcareous soils. J. articulatus was found to be more sensitive to drought and salt stress than its congeners J. acutus and J. maritimus. It is a perennial herb producing mainly erect stems from a short rhizome. The stem may root at nodes, and it generally has one or more flattened hollow cylindrical leaves up to 10 centimeters long. Transverse internal partitions or joints may be seen or felt in the leaf of the plant.

The inflorescence atop the stem has several branches with up to 25 clusters of up to 12 flowers each. Each individual flower has greenish to dark brown, pointed tepals 2 to 3 millimeters long, six stamens bearing anthers, and a protruding, feathery pistil. The fruit is a dark brown capsule with a pointed tip.
