= Fen-meadow =

Type of peatland

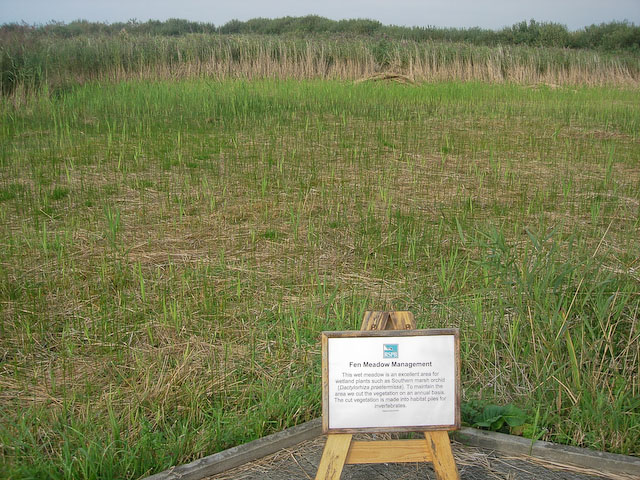
A fen-meadow in Norfolk

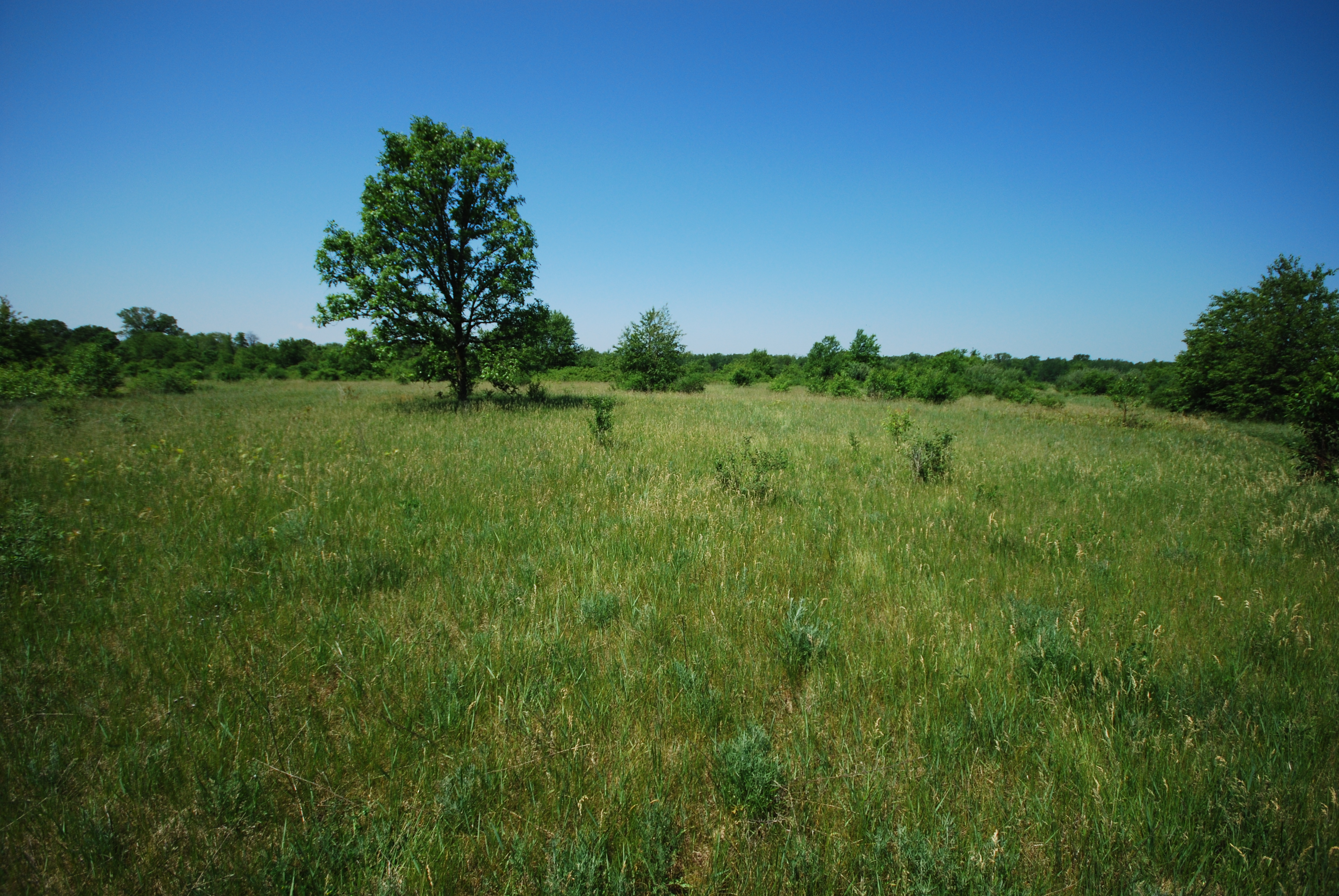
Ottawa Lake Fen Meadow in Wisconsin during summer months

A fen-meadow is a type of peatland, common in North America and Europe, that receives water from precipitation and groundwater.

== Habitat ==
The continuous flow of mineral-rich and nutrient-poor acidic groundwater through fen-meadow topsoil fosters endemic plant species, including plant associations such as Juncus subnodulosus-Cirsium palustre, and protects them from floods, droughts, and nutrient pollution.

== Degradation by human activity ==
Fen meadows have been severely impacted by farming, resulting in hydrological changes, acidification, and nutrient pollution, leaving few preserved into the 21st century. Compositional transformations and increased groundwater flow have the greatest effect this habitat and can degrade peat. Keeping water tables at appropriate levels allows fen meadows to regulate themselves. Restoration efforts are difficult and no deteriorated fens have been fully restored. Therefore, preservation efforts focus on maintaining fen meadows with slight to no anthropogenic interference.

== Habitat protection and restoration ==
The consequences of water supply alteration are severe. Even after acidified topsoil has been removed and replaced, native species reintroduced, and groundwater sources restored or purified, fen meadows are unable to return to their natural state. Rewetting, maintenance, and seed transfer are used in unison to recover damaged fens. Rewetting reintroduces water to topsoil, but not water flow. Without proper drainage mechanisms in place, the water will provide correct amounts of nutrients and minerals but drown the vegetation in the area. Maintenance, like mowing, can be a rapid way to salvage vegetative species. Combined with seed transfer, to reintroduce vital biotic components to the habitat. Although most fens do not ever return to the natural state that requires no human upkeep, maintenance can be slowly reduced over time.

== See also ==
- Fen
- Meadow
