= List of Sites of Special Scientific Interest in Devon =

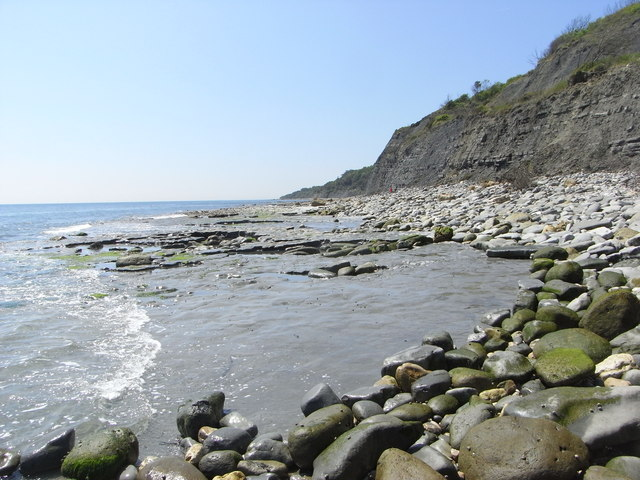
Seven Rock Point, on the Axmouth to Lyme Regis Undercliffs SSSI

This is a list of the Sites of Special Scientific Interest (SSSIs) in Devon, England, United Kingdom. Natural England formerly English Nature is responsible for designating SSSIs in England, and chooses sites because of their fauna, flora, geological or physiographical features. As of February 2012, there are 211 sites designated in this Area of Search. 71 of the sites are designated for their geological interest, 109 for biological interest and 31 are of interest for both. Eleven of Devon's SSSIs are national nature reserves, sixteen are managed by the Devon Wildlife Trust and three are bird sanctuaries. There are 49 Special Areas of Conservation.

For other counties, see List of SSSIs by Area of Search.

== Sites ==
Site name	Reason for Designation		Area (ha)	Location	Year in which notified	Map/Refs
Site name	Biological interest	Geological interest	Area (ha)	Location	Year in which notified	Map/Refs
Aller Sand Pit		✓	0.2	50.515°N 3.582°W; SX879695	1969	Map
Andrew's Wood	✓		23.5	50.3492°N 3.817°W; SX708515	1952	Map
Arlington	✓		45.3	51.147°N 3.991°W; SS608405	1988	Map
Ashburton Road Cuttings		✓	5.8	50.506°N 3.765°W; SX749689	1997	Map
Ashculm Turbary	✓		6.6	50.934°N 3.217°W; ST146157	1976	Map
Axmouth to Lyme Regis Undercliffs	✓	✓	334.6	50.705°N 2.993°W; SY300900 to 50.717°N 2.960°W; SY323913	1952	Map
Babbacombe Cliffs	✓		13.5	50.484°N 3.515°W; SX926660	1976	Map
Barle Valley	✓		622.9	51.102°N 3.644°W; SS850349 to 51.045°N 3.548°W; SS915284	1954	Map
Barricane Beach		✓	8.2	51.177°N 4.214°W; SS453443	1989	Map
Beaford Moor	✓		31.6	50.914°N 4.021°W; SS580147	1987	Map
Beer Quarry Caves	✓	✓	27.8	50.701°N 3.113°W; SY215896	1952	Map
Berry Head to Sharkham Point	✓	✓	67.9	50.399°N 3.483°W; SX947565	1952	Map
Bickleigh Wood Quarry		✓	0.6	50.951°N 3.506°W; SS943179	1974	Map
Billacombe	✓		1.9	50.367°N 4.085°W; SX518540	1989	Map
Black Down and Sampford Commons	✓		155.2	50.938°N 3.257°W; ST118161	1952	Map
Blackslade Mire	✓		67.6	50.566°N 3.785°W; SX737756	1952	Map
Blackstone Point	✓		7.38	50.297°N 4.058°W; SX535462	2000	Map
Bolshayne Fen	✓		1.6	50.739°N 3.104°W; SY222938	1992	Map
Bolt Head to Bolt Tail	✓		228.7	50.241°N 3.8667°W; SX670396	1976	Map
Bonhay Road Cutting		✓	0.3	50.723°N 3.54°W; SX914926	1974	Map
Bovey Heathfield	✓		25.3	50.579°N 3.671°W; SX818768	1989	Map
Bovey Valley Woodlands	✓		261.5	50.784°N 3.001°W; SY295987	1963	Map
Bradiford Valley	✓		23.2	51.096°N 4.062°W; SS557350	1974	Map
Bradworthy Common	✓		14.1	50.909°N 4.384°W; SS325149	1992	Map
Brampford Speke		✓	83	50.777°N 3.519°W; SX930986	1993	Map
Braunton Burrows	✓	✓	1356.7	51.093°N 4.243°W; SS430350	1952	Map
Braunton Swanpool	✓		11.9	51.11°N 4.186°W; SS471368	1988	Map
Brendon and Vealand Fen	✓		18.3	50.836°N 4.443°W; SS281069	1989	Map
Brendon Farm (North)	✓		16.1	50.846°N 4.32°W; SS368077	1991	Map
Brent Tor		✓	6.7	50.603°N 4.163°W; SX470804	1988	Map
Brocks Farm	✓		1.5	50.57°N 3.637°W; SX842758	1986	Map
Broom Gravel Pits		✓	1.6	50.814°N 2.958°W; ST326020	1986	Map
Buckfastleigh Caves		✓	26.3	50.485°N 3.775°W; SX742665	1964	Map
Buckland-in-the-moor	✓		0.6	50.545°N 3.808°W; SX720733	1976	Map
Budleigh Salterton Cliffs		✓	10.6	50.626°N 3.33°W; SY060815	1964	Map
Bulkamore Iron Mine	✓		8.4	50.455°N 3.764°W; SX749632	1994	Map
Buller's Hill Quarry		✓	1.4	50.651°N 3.583°W; SX882847	1976	Map
Bulmoor Pastures and Coppice	✓		24.1	50.739°N 2.998°W; SY297937	1991	Map
Burrator Quarries		✓	0.5	50.491°N 4.047°W; SX549677	1976	Map
Bursdon Moor	✓		144.2	50.953°N 4.469°W; SS267200	1988	Map
Caen Valley Bats	✓		0.1	51.118°N 4.167°W; SS484377	2002	Map
Chapel Hill	✓		0.2	51.113°N 4.159°W; SS490371	1992	Map
Chipley Quarries		✓	1.0	50.536°N 3.683°W; SX808721	1976	Map
Cholwell Brook		✓	12.6	50.612°N 4.106°W; SX511813	1997	Map
Chudleigh Caves and Woods		✓	29.3	50.598°N 3.595°W; SX872788	1964	Map
Chudleigh Knighton Heath	✓		50.7	50.587°N 3.643°W; SX838776	1974	Map
Common Moor Langtree	✓		17.1	50.897°N 4.193°W; SS459131	1987	Map
Common Moor, East Putford	✓		53.9	50.938°N 4.316°W; SS374180	1988	Map
Coombe Meadow	✓		5.1	50.8°N 4.133°W; SS498022	1988	Map
Coryton Quarry		✓	2.0	50.684°N 4.173°W; SX466894	1999	Map
Crockham Quarry		✓	13.6	50.615°N 3.63°W; SX848808	1995	Map
Daddyhole	✓	✓	3.6	50.455°N 3.513°W; SX927628	1988	Map
Dawlish Cliffs		✓	8.5	50.574°N 3.47°W; SX960759	1974	Map
Dawlish Warren	✓	✓	207.0	50.606°N 3.436°W; SX985795	1952	Map
Dean Steep		✓	1.8	51.216°N 3.85°W; SS709479	1985	Map
Dendles Wood	✓		50.4	50.441°N 3.952°W; SX615620	1965	Map
Deptford Farm Pastures	✓		22.2	50.942°N 4.457°W; SS275187	1991	Map
Devon Great Consols		✓	0.3	50.54°N 4.216°W; SX431735	1985	Map
Devon United Mine		✓	1.0	50.596°N 4.091°W; SX521795	1987	Map
Dunnabridge Meadows	✓		2.6	50.551°N 3.921°W; SX640741	1983	Map
Dunsdon Farm	✓		39.2	50.849°N 4.406°W; SS307083	1986	Map
Dunsland Park	✓		26.8	50.824°N 4.26°W; SS409051	1991	Map
Dyer's Quarry		✓	0.8	50.455°N 3.52°W; SX922628	1988	Map
East Dartmoor	✓	✓	2088.1	50.619°N 3.846°W; SX695815	1976	Map
East Devon Pebblebed Heaths	✓	✓	1111.9	50.684°N 3.346°W; SY050880	1952	Map
East Ogwell Quarry		✓	0.4	50.524°N 3.639°W; SX839706	1985	Map
Erme Estuary	✓		431.4	50.325°N 3.936°W; SX623490	1976	Map
Exe Estuary	✓		2181.6	50.651°N 3.444°W; SX980845	1952	Map
Exmoor Coastal Heaths	✓		1758.3	51.214°N 3.977°W; SS620480	1994	Map
Faraday Road		✓	0.2	50.368°N 4.113°W; SX498542	1986	Map
Five Oaks, Bampton		✓	0.6	50.989°N 3.497°W; SS950221	1985	Map
Fremington Claypit		✓	4.1	51.064°N 4.099°W; SS530315	1974	Map
Fremington Quay Cliffs		✓	10.6	51.086°N 4.119°W; SS517340	1974	Map
Froward Point	✓		32.1	50.337°N 3.54°W; SX905497	1952	Map
Furley Chalk Pit		✓	2.1	50.833°N 3.029°W; ST276042	1969	Map
Gilmoor and Moorlands	✓		10.9	50.772°N 3.94°W; SX633987	1987	Map
Glenthorne		✓	13.3	51.235°N 3.729°W; SS794499	1989	Map
Great Haldon Heaths	✓		53.2	50.596°N 3.556°W; SX900785	1988	Map
Greenaways and Freshmarsh, Braunton	✓		13.5	51.096°N 4.195°W; SS464353	1981	Map
Grenofen Wood and West Down	✓		102.3	50.517°N 4.134°W; SX488707	1952	Map
Haldon Forest	✓		1013.2	50.643°N 3.576°W; SX886838	1992	Map
Hallsands-Beesands		✓	13.3	50.25°N 3.657°W; SX819403	1999	Map
Halsdon	✓		56.8	50.893°N 4.056°W; SS555125	1972?	Map
Halstock Wood	✓		25.5	50.725°N 3.974°W; SX607936	1952	Map
Hannaborough Quarry		✓	0.8	50.806°N 4.089°W; SS529029	1974	Map
Hare's Down, Knowstone and Rackenford Moors	✓		217.6	50.979°N 3.643°W; SS847213	1981	Map
Haytor and Smallacombe Iron Mines		✓	2.5	50.581°N 3.734°W; SX773772	1952	Map
Haytor Rocks and Quarries		✓	48.0	50.579°N 3.756°W; SX757770	1990	Map
Hele, Samson's and Combe Martin Bays		✓	22.2	51.211°N 4.097°W; SS536479	1998	Map
Hembury Woods	✓		123.6	50.502°N 3.799°W; SX725685	1976	Map
Hense Moor	✓		91.2	50.865°N 3.173°W; ST175080	1969	Map
Hense Moor Meadows	✓		3.2	50.854°N 3.176°W; ST173068	1986	Map
High Down Quarry		✓	0.8	51.044°N 3.924°W; SS652290	1983	Map
Hobby to Peppercombe	✓		240.6	50.992°N 4.395°W; SS320242	1952	Map
Hollow Moor and Odham Moor	✓		182.9	50.792°N 4.172°W; SS470015	1986	Map
Holne Woodlands	✓		1006.7	50.529°N 3.807°W; SX720715	1952	Map
Hope's Nose to Wall's Hill	✓	✓	64.7	50.478°N 3.506°W; SX932654	1952	Map
Hunshaw Wood	✓		18.6	50.924°N 4.121°W; SS510160	1952	Map
Kents Cavern		✓	1.7	50.467°N 3.503°W; SX934641	1952	Map
Kersdown Quarry		✓	8.3	50.989°N 3.478°W; SS963222	1974	Map
Killerton		✓	75.4	50.796°N 3.458°W; SS973007	1986	Map
Kingford Fen	✓		7.4	50.827°N 4.442°W; SS281059	1987	Map
Kismeldon Meadows	✓		36.0	50.929°N 4.347°W; SS351171	1987	Map
Ladram Bay to Sidmouth	✓		17.1	50.662°N 3.274°W; SY100855	22/10/86	Map
Lady's Wood and Viaduct Meadow	✓		4.7	50.417°N 3.852°W; SX685591	24/10/86	Map
Lambert's Castle	✓		109.2	50.776°N 2.896°W; SY369978	8/02/89	Map
Laughter Quarry		✓	0.9	50.57°N 3.897°W; SX657763	11/10/88	Map
Leusdon Common		✓	9.3	50.54°N 3.83°W; SX704728	19/01/90	Map
Little Haldon Heaths	✓		119.0	50.577°N 3.533°W; SX915764	14/07/89	Map
Lockridge Mine		✓	0.5	50.475°N 4.202°W; SX438663	18/08/89	Map
Lord's Wood	✓		21.2	50.373°N 3.584°W; SX874538	30/04/85	Map
Lower Dunscombe Farm Quarry		✓	0.1	50.6°N 3.576°W; SX885790	26/11/84	Map
Lower Whipcott		✓	6.4	50.957°N 3.328°W; ST068184	31/01/86	Map
Lummaton Quarry		✓	4.9	50.488°N 3.535°W; SX912665	11/09/84	Map
Lundy	✓		344.9	51.171°N 4.682°W; SS126448	3/09/87	Map
Lydford Gorge	✓	✓	36.2	50.632°N 4.119°W; SX502836	5/02/86	Map
Lydford Railway Ponds	✓		1.3	50.624°N 4.122°W; SX500827	6/01/86	Map
Maiden Down	✓		39.6	50.935°N 3.3°W; ST087159	11/05/90	Map
Mambury and Stowford Moors	✓		39.9	50.921°N 4.293°W; SS389161	1/06/90	Map
Marsland to Clovelly Coast	✓		931.7	51.02°N 4.477°W; SS263275	31/03/93	Map
Meadfoot Sea Road		✓	6.2	50.458°N 3.505°W; SX932632	20/11/87	Map
Meldon Aplite Quarry	✓	✓	20.8	50.709°N 4.03°W; SX567919	17/01/86	Map
Meldon Quarry		✓	76.3	50.714°N 4.024°W; SX572925	26/01/90	Map
Mermaid's Pool to Rowden Gut	✓	✓	152.2	51.017°N 4.279°W; SS402267	25/01/96	Map
Merrivale	✓	✓	489	50.567°N 4.068°W; SX536762	17/09/97	Map
Mill Rock SSSI	✓	✓	0.1	51.166°N 4.211°W; SS455431	28/07/89	Map
Morte Point	✓		96.9	51.186°N 4.219°W; SS450454	8/01/86	Map
Mount Wise		✓	0.5	50.365°N 4.173°W; SX455540	25/06/85	Map
Napp's Cave		✓	11.8	51.207°N 4.058°W; SS563474	7/01/86	Map
New Cut, Torquay		✓	0	50.463°N 3.501°W; SX935637	27/02/96	Map
North Dartmoor	✓	✓	13560.6	50.652°N 3.99°W; SX594855	31/01/89	Map
North Exmoor	✓	✓	12000.4	51.179°N 3.745°W; SS781437	15/05/92	Map
Northam Burrows		✓	421.9	51.056°N 4.225°W; SS441309	29/06/88	Map
Nymet Barton Marsh	✓		10.1	50.795°N 3.807°W; SS727011	12/01/90	Map
Occombe	✓		11.8	50.459°N 3.584°W; SX876634	24/01/92	Map
Okehampton Park Flush	✓		4.8	50.726°N 4.009°W; SX583938	16/08/90	Map
Otter Estuary	✓	✓	32.1	50.632°N 3.307°W; SY076822	11/02/86	Map
Park Farm Meadows	✓		6.1	50.751°N 3.002°W; SY294951	11/11/91	Map
Park Gate Quarry		✓	0.9	51.047°N 4.061°W; SS556296	6/01/86	Map
Piles Copse	✓		50.3	50.439°N 3.909°W; SX645617	17/08/84	Map
Pitt's Cleave		✓	9.6	50.564°N 4.117°W; SX501760	9/08/91	Map
Plaistow Quarry		✓	13	51.116°N 4.047°W; SS568372	12/02/85	Map
Plymbridge Lane and Estover Road	✓		0.3	50.418°N 4.114°W; SX499598	29/11/91	Map
Plymouth Sound, Shores and Cliffs	✓		44.2	50.356°N 4.126°W; SX488529	28/09/97	Map
Popehouse Moor	✓		3.2	50.356°N 4.126°W; SS647097	7/07/89	Map
Posbury Clump		✓	1.7	50.356°N 4.126°W; SX814977	21/02/86	Map
Potter's Wood		✓	17.4	50.356°N 4.126°W; SX736651	22/05/86	Map
Prawle Point and Start Point	✓	✓	337.4	50.356°N 4.126°W; SX792365	17/10/86	Map
Pridhamsleigh Caves	✓	✓	7.7	50.497°N 3.765°W; SX749679	17/01/86	Map
Quarry Fields Farm	✓		5.4	50.806°N 3.03°W; ST275013	20/07/90	Map
Ransley Quarry		✓	0.4	50.519°N 3.631°W; SX844701	31/07/84	Map
Reed's Farm Pit	✓		0.7	50.795°N 3.119°W; ST212002	24/03/95	Map
Ribsons Meadows	✓		9.0	50.797°N 4.138°W; SS494020	24/06/88	Map
Richmond Walk		✓	0.2	50.368°N 4.166°W; SX460543	24/01/92	Map
River Axe	✓	✓	69.5	50.784°N 3.001°W; SY295987 to 50.729°N 3.0513°W; SY259927	7/05/99	Map
River Lemon Valley Woods	✓	✓	70.4	50.526°N 3.644°W; SX835709	17/09/86	Map
River Lyn	✓	✓	17.1	51.178°N 3.858°W; SS702438	15/03/96	Map
Roundham Head		✓	3.9	50.429°N 3.554°W; SX897600	31/10/86	Map
Rushford Wood	✓		20.7	50.695°N 3.84°W; SX701901	17/01/86	Map
Ryecroft Quarry		✓	2.3	50.65°N 3.639°W; SX842847	19/01/90	Map
Salcombe to Kingsbridge Estuary	✓		634.5	50.251°N 3.761°W; SX745405	6/02/87	Map
Saltern Cove	✓	✓	15.5	50.416°N 3.556°W; SX895586	1/01/85	Map
Sampford Spiney	✓		173.7	50.544°N 4.054°W; SX545736	14/03/86	Map
Saunton to Baggy Point coast	✓	✓	148.1	51.127°N 4.242°W; SS432389	21/11/86	Map
Scabbacombe	✓		7.9	50.357°N 3.525°W; SX916520	21/11/86	Map
Shapwick Grange Quarry	✓	✓	5.7	50.72°N 2.977°W; SY311917	5/09/86	Map
Shaugh Prior Woods	✓		87.6	50.456°N 4.052°W; SX544639	31/07/86	Map
Sidmouth to Beer Coast	✓	✓	242	50.686°N 3.159°W; SY182881	9/08/85	Map
Slapton Ley	✓	✓	254.7	50.285°N 3.646°W; SX828441	11/02/04	Map
Small Brook	✓		14.8	50.833°N 4.398°W; SS312065	31/10/91	Map
South Brentor Quarry		✓	0.1	50.604°N 4.15°W; SX479805	26/08/88	Map
South Dartmoor	✓	✓	7113.9	50.477°N 3.93°W; SX631660	31/01/89	Map
South Exmoor	✓		3130.7	51.06°N 3.695°W; SS813304	26/06/92	Map
South Milton Ley	✓		16.5	50.264°N 3.847°W; SX684421	11/12/84	Map
Southacre Clay Pit		✓	62.8	50.567°N 3.62°W; SX853755	31/03/95	Map
Southey and Gotleigh Moors	✓		61.5	50.891°N 3.148°W; ST193109	1/02/88	Map
Southmoor Farm	✓		28.3	50.784°N 4.038°W; SS564003	1/09/87	Map
Spara Bridge		✓	1.1	50.646°N 3.64°W; SX841843	14/09/90	Map
Spring Head, Axmouth	✓		13.6	50.711°N 3.035°W; SY270907	9/08/85	Map
Staddon Moor	✓		4.8	50.807°N 3.874°W; SS680026	26/04/91	Map
Stoke Woods	✓		91.7	50.754°N 3.516°W; SX931961	26/09/86	Map
Stokenham	✓		0.7	50.262°N 3.67°W; SX810416	10/01/86	Map
Stout's Cottage		✓	0.5	50.964°N 3.357°W; ST048192	30/04/85	Map
Stover Park	✓		45.7	50.564°N 3.647°W; SX834752	5/01/84	Map
Tamar-Tavy Estuary	✓		1413.7	50.422°N 4.2°W; SX438604	27/03/91	Map
Taw-Torridge Estuary	✓		1375.1	51.056°N 4.187°W; SS468308	19/12/88	Map
Teign Valley Woods	✓		175.2	50.681°N 3.702°W; SX798882	21/01/85	Map
Thorne and Doves Moors	✓		78.8	50.918°N 4.259°W; SS413157	2/10/92	Map
Tidcombe Lane Fen	✓		6.9	50.904°N 3.46°W; SS974127	11/10/88	Map
Tor Royal Bog	✓		58.4	50.531°N 3.969°W; SX605721	13/11/84	Map
Torbryan Caves		✓	19.1	50.494°N 3.672°W; SX815674	1/05/97	Map
Tower Wood Quarry		✓	0.2	50.659°N 3.591°W; SX876856	31/03/89	Map
Two Bridges Quarry		✓	0.1	50.558°N 3.965°W; SX609750	14/05/85	Map
Ugbrooke Park	✓		13.5	50.591°N 3.596°W; SX871781	30/03/90	Map
Wallsend Industrial Estate		✓	0.6	50.363°N 4.121°W; SX492537	31/07/91	Map
Watersmeet	✓	✓	345.9	51.223°N 3.801°W; SS743487	3/06/86	Map
Webberton Cross Quarries		✓	2.3	50.673°N 3.593°W; SX875872	18/03/86	Map
Wembury Point	✓		138.7	50.319°N 4.098°W; SX507487	8/11/84	Map
West Exmoor coast and woods	✓	✓	698.5	51.218°N 3.958°W; SS633484	4/03/86	Map
Western King		✓	1.8	50.359°N 4.164°W; SX461533	9/08/85	Map
Westward Ho! Cliffs	✓	✓	28.7	51.041°N 4.24°W; SS430293	1/05/85	Map
Wheal Emily		✓	0.3	50.329°N 4.052°W; SX540497	12/11/90	Map
Whiddon Deer Park	✓		49.1	50.688°N 3.806°W; SX725892	6/12/91	Map
Whiddon Moor, Luckcoft and Odham Marshes	✓		27.1	50.784°N 4.151°W; SS484005	21/10/91	Map
Whitchurch Down	✓		3.7	50.547°N 4.11°W; SX506741	24/08/87	Map
Whiteleigh Meadows	✓		81.5	50.804°N 4.247°W; SS417030	18/11/87	Map
Wilmington Quarry		✓	22.8	50.79°N 3.124°W; SY208996	19/06/84	Map
Wistman's Wood	✓		267.7	50.577°N 3.958°W; SX614771	10/05/85	Map
Wolborough Fen	✓		8.2	50.518°N 3.603°W; SX864700	21/03/90	Map
Yarner Wood and Trendlebere Down	✓		324.1	50.6°N 3.732°W; SX775793	30/08/96	Map
Yealm Estuary	✓		87.2	50.338°N 4.029°W; SX557507	29/09/97	Map
