= List of biodiversity conservation sites in the United Kingdom =

This article provides a list of sites in the United Kingdom which are recognised for their importance to biodiversity conservation. The list is divided geographically by region and county.

== Inclusion criteria ==
Sites are included in this list if they are given any of the following designations:

Sites of importance in a global context

- Biosphere Reserves (BR)
- World Heritage Sites (WHS) (where biological interest forms part of the reason for designation)
- all Ramsar Sites

Sites of importance in a European context

- all Special Protection Areas (SPA)
- all Special Area of Conservation (SAC)
- all Important Bird Areas (IBA)

Sites of importance in a national context

- all sites which were included in the Nature Conservation Review (NCR site)
- all national nature reserves (NNR)
- Sites of Special Scientific Interest (SSSI), where biological interest forms part of the justification for notification (SSSIs which are designated purely for their geological interest are not included unless they meet other criteria)

== England ==
=== Southwest ===
==== Cornwall ====
Site name(s)	Type of site	Nature conservation interest	Designation(s)
Sites on the Penwith Peninsula
Aire Point to Carrick Du SSSI	Coastal cliffs and heathland	Maritime and heathland plant communities; nationally rare & scarce plants and invertebrates	NCR, SSSI
Chyenhal Moor			SSSI
Leswidden Block Works	Former china clay workings	Populations of western rustwort, Marsupella profunda, an internationally rare liverwort	SSSI
Lower Bostraze China Clay Works	Former china clay workings	Populations of western rustwort, Marsupella profunda, an internationally rare liverwort	SSSI
Porthgwarra to Pordenack Point			SSSI
Treen Cliff			SSSI
The Lizard
West Lizard SSSI	Heathland	Nationally rare & scarce plants & invertebrates	SSSI
Other sites
Bodmin Moor	Upland moorland	Moorland birds, dragonflies & butterflies	IBA
Carrack Gladden	Coastal headland	Plant communities, nationally scarce plants	SSSI
Gwithian to Mexico Towans			SSSI
Godrevy Head to St Agnes			SSSI
The Hayle Estuary			SSSI
Lymsworthy Meadows			SSSI
Marazion Marsh			SSSI
Meddon Moor			SSSI
Porth Kidney Sands			SSSI
Tamar Estuary complex	Estuary	Estuary birds	IBA

==== Devon ====
Site name(s)	Type of site	Nature conservation interest	Designation(s)
The Exe Estuary
Dawlish Warren	Vegetated sand spit and estuary	Estuary birds, nationally rare plants	NNR, SSSI
Sites in east Devon
Aylesbeare Common	Heathland	Heathland birds, dragonflies	SSSI
Bolshayne Fen	Valley fen	Fenland plant communities	SSSI
Sites in south Devon
Berry Head	Coastal headland	Seabird colony, nationally rare plants	SSSI
South Milton Ley	Freshwater reedbed	Reedbed birds	SSSI
Sites in north Devon
Bursdon Moor			SSSI
Bradworthy Common			SSSI
Kismeldon Meadows			SSSI
Deptford Farm Pastures			SSSI
Braunton Burrows	Sand dune system	Complete successional range, nationally rare plants and animals	SSSI, BR, NNR (part), SAC

==== Dorset ====
Site name(s)	Type of site	Nature conservation interest	Designation(s)
Poole Harbour	Natural harbour (the second largest in the world, after Sydney harbour)	Wintering shorebirds, wintering wildfowl	IBA
Brownsea Island	Island, including a lagoon	Red squirrel; breeding, wintering and migrant birds	IBA, SSSI

==== Somerset ====
Site name(s)	Type of site	Nature conservation interest	Designation(s)
Mendip Hills
Priddy Mineries	Heathland & pool	Flora, invertebrates	SSSI
Other sites
Cheddar Reservoir	Artificial reservoir	Wintering waterfowl	SSSI
Bridgwater Bay	Estuary	Estuary birds	SSSI
Brean Down	Limestone headland	Grassland plant communities; rare invertebrates	SSSI
Grove Farm			SSSI
Millwater			SSSI
Whitevine Meadows			SSSI
Windsor Hill Marsh	Marshy field	Locally notable plant species	SSSI

==== Avon ====
Site name(s)	Type of site	Nature conservation interest	Designation(s)
Ashton Court	Deer park	Saproxylic invertebrates	SSSI
Avon Gorge (Leigh Woods)	Limestone gorge and semi-natural broad-leaved woodland	Plant communities, insect communities	NNR, SAC, SSSI
Banwell Caves	Caves	Greater horseshoe bat roost site	SSSI
Biddle Street, Yatton			SSSI
Bishop's Hill Wood			SSSI
Blagdon Lake	Artificial reservoir		SSSI
Bodkin Hazel Wood			SSSI
Brockley Hall Stables	Former stable block	Greater horseshoe bat breeding site	SSSI
Burledge Sidelands and Meadows	Unimproved grassland		SSSI
Burrington Combe	Limestone gorge		SSSI
Chew Valley Lake	Artificial reservoir	Wildfowl	SPA, SSSI
Cleeve Wood, Hanham	Semi-natural broad-leaved woodland	Nationally scarce plant	SSSI
Combe Down and Bathampton Down Mines	Stone mines	Greater horseshoe bat roosts	SSSI
Compton Martin Ochre Mine	Stone mine	Greater horseshoe bat roost	SSSI
Congrove Field and The Tumps	Unimproved grassland		SSSI
Ellenborough Park	Dune grassland, managed as parkland	Dune grassland plant communities including two Red Data Book species, branched horsetail and smooth rupturewort	SSSI
Folly Farm, Bishop Sutton	Meadow and woodland	Grassland plant communities, invertebrate communities	SSSI
Gordano valley	Peatland	Plant communities, invertebrate communities	NNR, SSSI
Harptree Combe	Wooded combe	Plant communities, invertebrate communities, the rare Appleyard's feather-moss	SSSI
Horseshoe Bend, Shirehampton	Wooded cliff and saltmarsh strip	Plant communities, including the nationally rare True Service-tree	SSSI
Iford Manor	Country house	Greater horseshoe bat breeding site	SSSI
St Catherine's Valley	Grassland	Grassland plant communities; locally scarce plants	SSSI
Uphill Cliff			SSSI
Yanal Bog	Lowland mire	Plant communities	SSSI

==== Wiltshire ====
Site name(s)	Type of site	Nature conservation interest	Designation(s)
Baverstock Juniper Bank	Chalk grassland and scrub	Large population of juniper	SSSI
Bentley Wood	Extensive area of semi-natural broadleaved woodland	Insect communities	SSSI
Box Mine	Abandoned stone mines	Roost site for bats, including greater horseshoe	SSSI
Calstone and Cherhill Downs	Extensive area of calcareous grassland	One of a small number of British sites for the wart-biter	SSSI
Chilmark Quarries	Quarries with a cave system	Winter roost for Bechstein's bat and other bat species	SSSI
Fonthill Grottoes	Subterranean follies	Winter roost for up to nine bat species	SSSI

==== Gloucestershire ====
Site name(s)	Type of site	Nature conservation interest	Designation(s)
Forest of Dean	Extensive area of semi-natural broadleaved woodland	Plant communities, woodland birds, insect communities	
Dean Hall Coach House and Stables	Country house	Greater horseshoe bat breeding roost	SSSI

== Southeast ==
=== Bedfordshire ===
Site name(s)	Type of site	Nature conservation interest	Designation(s)
Barton Hills	Lowland grassland	Grassland plant communities	NNR
King's Wood, Heath and Reach	Woodland	Woodland plant communities	NNR
Knocking Hoe	Grassland	Grassland plant communities	NNR

=== Buckinghamshire ===
Site name(s)	Type of site	Nature conservation interest	Designation(s)
Windsor Hill SSSI	Beech woodland, scrub and chalk grassland	Plant communities	NCR, SSSI

=== Hampshire ===
Site name(s)	Type of site	Nature conservation interest	Designation(s)
Upper Greensand Hangars	Semi-natural broadleaved woodland	Plant communities and geology	SSSI

=== Kent ===
Site name(s)	Type of site	Nature conservation interest	Designation(s)
Burham Down	Calcareous woodland and grassland		SSSI
Burham Marsh			SSSI
East Blean Woods		Heath fritillary	SSSI, SAC, NNR
Hothfield Common	Heath		LNR, SSSI
Lydden Temple Ewell	Calcareous grassland	Early spider orchid, burnt orchid, silver-spotted skipper, Adonis blue	SSSI, SAC, NNR
Marden Meadow	Neutral grassland	Green-winged orchid	Part SSSI
Oare Marshes			SSSI, Ramsar Site, LNR, SPA, ESA
Park Gate Down	Calcareous grassland	Lady orchid, late spider orchid, monkey orchid and musk orchid,	SSSI, SAC
Queendown Warren	Calcareous grassland	Early spider orchid and lady orchid	SSSI, SAC, LNR
Romney Marsh Visitor Centre			SSSI, LNR
Sandwich and Pegwell Bay	Coastal grassland and dunes	Lizard orchid	SSSI, Ramsar Site, SPA, cSAC, NNR
Sevenoaks Wildlife Reserve			SSSI
South Swale			SSSI, Ramsar Site, LNR, SPA, ESA
West Blean		Heath fritillary	SSSI
Westfield Wood	Calcareous woodland		SAC, SSSI
Yockletts Bank	Calcareous woodland	Lady orchid	SSSI

=== Surrey ===
Site name(s)	Type of site	Nature conservation interest	Designation(s)
Bookham Commons	Woodland, grassland and scrub	Locally notable plants, rare moths, breeding bird communities	SSSI

=== Sussex ===
Rye Harbour Nature Reserve

=== Midlands ===
==== Shropshire ====
Site name(s)	Type of site	Nature conservation interest	Designation(s)
Catherton Common	Uncultivated heathland	Nationally scarce bird, insect and plant species	SSSI

==== Worcestershire ====
Site name(s)	Type of site	Nature conservation interest	Designation(s)
Christopher Cadbury Wetland Reserve	Wetland (freshwater & saline pools)	Many species of birds, including avocet, curlew, ringed plover and bittern	SSSI
Wyre Forest	Semi-natural woodland	Wildlife including hawfinch, dipper, common crossbill, pied flycatcher, long-eared owl and adder.	NNR, SSSI

=== Northwest ===
==== Cheshire ====
Site name(s)	Type of site	Nature conservation interest	Designation(s)
Sandbach Flashes	Wetland (partially saline, even though inland)	Aquatic plant & invertebrate communities; woodland lichen flora; wintering wildfowl and waders	SSSI

=== Northeast ===
==== Lincolnshire ====
Site name(s)	Type of site	Nature conservation interest	Designation(s)
Potter Hanworth Wood	Small-leaved lime woodland	Plant & animal communities	SSSI

==== Yorkshire ====
Site name(s)	Type of site	Nature conservation interest	Designation(s)
Grass Wood, Wharfedale	Woodland with areas of limestone grassland	Plant community	SSSI

==== County Durham ====
Site name(s)	Type of site	Nature conservation interest	Designation(s)
Bishop Middleham Quarry	Disused quarry	Magnesian limestone grassland plant communities	SSSI

== Wales ==
=== Anglesey ===
Site name(s)	Type of site	Nature conservation interest	Designation(s)
Holy Island seabird cliffs
South Stack	Coastal cliff	Seabird colony	SPA
Anglesey tern colonies
The Skerries	Offshore islets	Seabird colony	IBA, SPA, SSSI
Cemlyn Bay and lagoon	Coastal lagoon	Tern colony	IBA, SPA, SSSI
Ynys Feurig	Offshore islets	Tern colony	IBA, SPA, SSSI
Other sites
Fedw Fawr	Coastal cliff	Seabird colony	SSSI

== Scotland ==
=== Northeast Scotland ===
Site name(s)	Type of site	Nature conservation interest	Designation(s)
Fowlsheugh, Kincardineshire	Cliff	Seabird colony	SPA, SSSI

=== Shetland ===
Site name(s)	Type of site	Nature conservation interest	Designation(s)
Hermaness	Cliff	Seabird colony	NNR

Unst

=== Outer Hebrides ===
Lewis and Harris
North Uist, South Uist and Benbecula

=== Other islands ===
Site name(s)	Type of site	Nature conservation interest	Designation(s)
St Kilda	Island group	Seabird colony (largest in Britain), endemic subspecies of wren and wood mouse	IBA, NNR, WHS
North Rona	Island	Seabird colony	IBA, NNR
Sula Sgeir	Island	Seabird colony	IBA, NNR
Flannan Isles	Island group	Seabird colony	IBA
Shiant Isles	Island	Seabird colony, passage & wintering geese	IBA
Monach Islands	Island group	Breeding seabirds, passage & wintering geese	IBA

== See also ==
- Conservation in the United Kingdom
- National Nature Reserves in the United Kingdom
- Sites of Special Scientific Interest
