= Sea road =

A Sea road generally refers to a sea lane, a regularly used navigable route for large water vessels (ships) on wide waterways such as oceans and large lakes, and is preferably safe, direct and economic. Sea road may also refer to the following:

== Architecture ==
- Sea Roads is a detached house in Penarth in the Vale of Glamorgan, Wales noted for its distinctive modernist design.

== Geology ==
- Meadfoot Sea Road is a 6.1 hectare geological Site of Special Scientific Interest in Devon, England, notified in 1987 for its Devonian geology.

== Infrastructure ==
- The Mid-Sea Road (海中道路, Kaichū Dōro) is a road in Uruma, Okinawa, Japan. 4.7 kilometres (2.9 mi) long, it forms part of Okinawa Prefectural Road No. 10 and runs across the sea.

== Maritime transport services ==
- Searoad Ferries, a roll-on/roll-off vehicle and passenger ferry service between the heads of Port Phillip, near Melbourne, Victoria, Australia.
- SeaRoad, an Australian company specialising in sea freight and transport services across Bass Strait.
