= Halstock Wood =

Protected area in Devon, England

Coordinates: 50°43′32″N 3°58′29″W

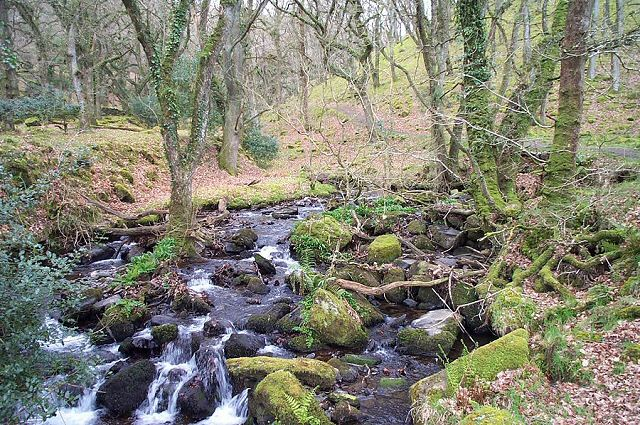
Halstock Wood

Halstock Wood is a Site of Special Scientific Interest (SSSI) within Dartmoor National Park in Devon, England. It is located in the valley of the East Okement River 1.5km southeast of Okehampton Railway Station. This woodland site is protected because of the upland habitat dominated by sessile oak.

== Biology ==
The woodland is dominated by sessile oak, some managed using coppice. Other tree species include ash, pedunculate oak, alder, hazel, holly and guelder-rose. Herbaceous species on the woodland floor include bluebell, wood anemone, pignut, sanicle and common cow-wheat. Bilberry occurs on acidic soils. In wetter areas, plants include meadowsweet and opposite-leaved golden-saxifrage. Lichen species in this woodland include the species Graphina ruiziana.

Bird species include raven, buzzard, redstart, wood warbler and pied flycatcher.

== Geology ==
There are a variety of rock types under this woodland, including chert, slate and tuff of Lower Carboniferous age.

== Land ownership ==
Part of the land within Halstock Wood SSSI is owned by the Duchy of Cornwall.
