= East Devon Pebblebed Heaths =

Heathland in Devon, England

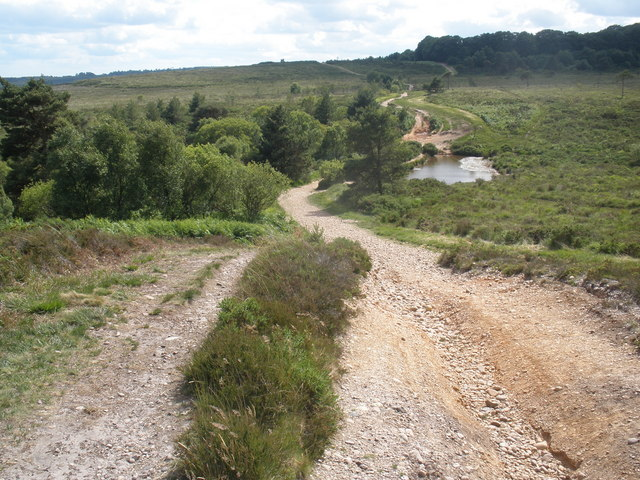
Part of Woodbury Common

The East Devon Pebblebed Heaths (grid reference SY050880) is an area of rare lowland heath in east Devon, England. Lying inland of the coastal towns of Exmouth and Budleigh Salterton, it forms a north–south ridge on the western side of the River Otter at heights above sea level varying between 70 and 150 m. The main area, to the south, consists of the contiguous East Budleigh Common, Lympstone Common, Bicton Common, Woodbury Common and Colaton Raleigh Common; to the north are Hawkerland Valley, Harpford Common, Aylesbeare Common and Venn Ottery Common; and there are a few smaller nearby areas.

The area forms part of the East Devon Area of Outstanding Natural Beauty, and is also a Site of Special Scientific Interest (listed since 1952), a Special Protected Area, and a Special Area of Conservation. The majority of the 1,124.4 hectares (2,778 acres) of the heath is managed with joint financial input from Clinton Devon Estates, government grants and the East Devon Pebblebed Heaths Conservation Trust, which employs full-time wardens and volunteers to look after the terrain. The Estate opened the heathland to public access "for air and exercise" following a legal deed it signed in 1930. Parts of the land designated as the East Devon Pebblebed Heaths SSSI are owned by the Ministry of Defence (Woodbury Common) and parts are owned by the Royal Society for the Protection of Birds.

The underlying geology of the area is mostly Bunter Pebblebeds of Triassic age, though there is some New Red Sandstone and marls of Permian age.

Notable breeding bird species that have been recorded on the site include the European nightjar, Eurasian hobby and Dartford warbler. Rare dragonflies include the small red damselfly, the southern damselfly and the downy emerald. Other insects recorded include the bog bush cricket. Annual wildlife surveys are carried with groups such as the Devon Amphibian and Reptile Group (DRAG), the Devon Bat Group, Butterfly Conservation, the Devon Wildlife Trust and the Devon Biodiversity Records Centre helping coordinate the work.

== See also ==
- List of Sites of Special Scientific Interest in Devon
