= Swanpool =

Swanpool may refer to:

- Swanpool, Victoria, Australia
- Swanpool, Cornwall, UK, a nature reserve beach and lake
- Swanpool, Devon, UK, a coastal nature reserve
- Swanpool, Lincoln, UK, a suburb of Lincoln
- Swanpool Wood and Furnace Grove, an SSSI in the Wye Valley, Gloucestershire
- Swanpool, a location in Battle Realms
