= Arlington SSSI, Devon =

Protected area in Devon, England

Coordinates: 51.144068°N 3.9927696°W

Arlington is a Site of Special Scientific Interest (SSSI) in Devon, England. The village of Arlington is located 8 km northeast of Barnstaple. This protected area includes the parkland within and around the Arlington Court estate, situated in the valley of the River Yeo (Barnstable Yeo). This area is protected because of the diversity of lichen species and the diversity of beetle species found in this parkland.

== Biology ==
Tree species in this parkland includes ash, beech and oaks (including several large mature oaks). There are also willows and alder on lake margins. Lichen species recorded here include Cetrelia olivetorum, Teloschistes flavicans, Sticta dufourii, Usnea articulata, Heterodermia obscurata (genus Heterodermia), Pannaria conoplea (genus Pannaria), Parmelia lacinatula (genus Parmelia) Lecidea carrollii (genus Lecidea) and species from Megalospora.

Insect species recorded in this parkland include the beetle species: Chrysolina haemoptera and Pterostichus oblongopunctatus, Sinodendron cylindricum, Biphyllus lunatus, Cerylon ferrugineum, Pediacus dermestoides (genus Pediacus) and the butterfly species called the high brown fritillary.

The snail species Zenobiella subrufescens has also been recorded in this protected area.

== Geology ==
The rocks underlying this area of parkland are slates from the Devonian period.

== Land ownership ==
Most of the land within Arlington SSSI is owned by the National Trust as this parkland is situated within Arlington Court estate.
