= Aller Sand Pit =

Geological site in Devon, England

- Site of Special Scientific Interest
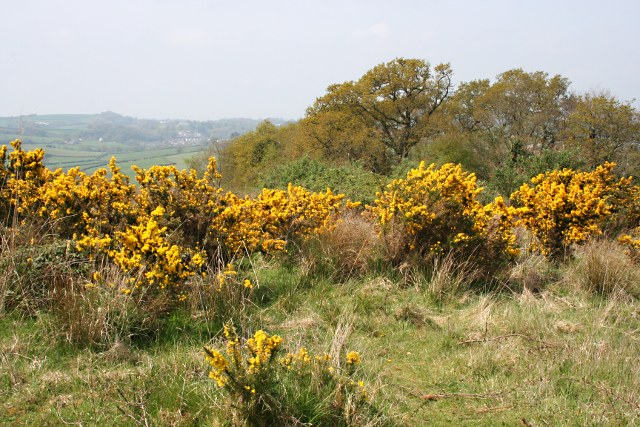

- Location within Devon
- Location of Aller Sand Pit.
- Area of search: Devon
- Grid reference: SX880695
- Coordinates: 50.515001°N 3.580365°W
- Interest: Geological
- Area: 0.22 ha (0.54 acres)
- Notification date: 1969

Aller Sand Pit (grid reference SX880695) is a 0.22 hectare geological Site of Special Scientific Interest in Devon, notified in 1969. It is the type section for the Aller Gravel.

== See also ==
- List of Sites of Special Scientific Interest in Devon
