= Buller's Hill Quarry =

Protected area in Devon, England

- Location within Devon
- Location: Devon, England
- Nearest city: Kennford
- Coordinates: 50°39′03″N 3°34′56″W
- Governing body: Forestry Commission

Buller's Hill Quarry is a Site of Special Scientific Interest (SSSI) in Devon, England. It is located 3 kilometres (1.9 mi) southwest of the village of Kennford. This protected area is on the border of another, Haldon Forest SSSI. This area is protected because of the gravel deposits containing flint dating from the Palaeogene period.

== Geology ==
Buller's Hill Quarry contains gravel deposits known as the Haldon Gravels. The underlying deposit at this site is called Tower Wood Gravel. During the Pleistocene these gravels were affected by periglacial processes as the overlying sheet of clay broke up and was incorporated as masses of clay in the Buller's Hill Gravel. In places there are deposits of Upper Greensand.

== Ownership ==
All land within Buller's Hill Quarry SSSI is owned by the Forestry Commission.
