= Stoke Woods =

Woodland in Devon, England

Coordinates: 50°45′19″N 3°31′09″W

Stoke Woods is a Site of Special Scientific Interest (SSSI) in the Exeter district, in the county of Devon, England. It is located near Cowley in the valley of the River Exe, 2km north of Exeter. It is protected because of its woodland bird diversity.

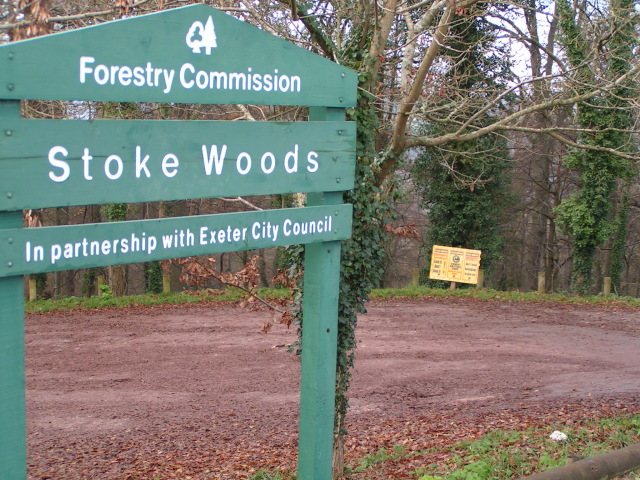

== Biology ==
Woodland trees include ash, cherry, wild service tree, field maple, beech, sycamore and alder. Herbaceous plants include bilberry, cow-wheat, enchanter's nightshade, dog's mercury, wood avens and primrose. Meadowsweet occurs along the streams.

Bird species include buzzard, tawny owl, nightingale and wood warbler.

== Geology ==
Rocks underlying this protected area include grits and shales of the Carboniferous Culm Measures. Gleyed soils are present.

== Land ownership ==
Most of the land in Stoke Woods SSSI is owned by the Forestry Commission. Much of the site is actively managed, so there is a mixture of broad-leaved forest, coppice, saplings and scrub, conifer plantations at various stages of growth, patches of tall herbs and grasses, and bare earth.
