= Maiden Down =

Protected area in Devon, England

Coordinates: 50°56′10″N 3°17′59″W

Maiden Down is a Site of Special Scientific Interest (SSSI) in Devon, England. It is located 1.8km southeast of Burlescombe and 2.9km northwest of Culmstock. Its northern edge borders the M5 motorway. This site is protected because of the diversity of insects supported by the heathland vegetation present.

== Biology ==
Plants in the dry heathland include heather, bell heather, western gorse and european gorse. Plants in the wet heathland include cross-leaved heath, meadow thistle, devil's-bit scabious and lousewort. There is also bog vegetation where plants include marsh violet, bog asphodel, oblong-leaved sundew, round-leaved sundew, cottongrass and bog St John's-wort.

Insects recorded in this protected area include the butterfly species: small pearl-bordered fritillary, marsh fritillary and silver-studded blue. The small grass emerald moth has also been recorded at this site.

== Geology ==
The rocks underlying this site are sandstones from the Triassic period. The soil overlaying this rock is sandy or, in places, containing peat.

== Commons ==
Maiden Down is registered as common land.
