= Tor Royal Bog =

Protected area in Devon, England

Coordinates: 50.532873°N 3.9711279°W

Tor Royal Bog is a Site of Special Scientific Interest (SSSI) within Dartmoor National Park in Devon, England. It is located 1.5km southeast of the village of Princetown. This area is protected because of the blanket bog habitat.

== Biology ==
Tor Royal Bog is an area of blanket bog surrounded by unimproved acidic grassland. The bog moss Sphagnum papillosum dominates the site, but Sphagnum imbracatum has also been recorded here. Plant species also include bog asphodel, cross-leaved heath, bilberry and round-leaved sundew. Around streams, lesser spearwort, round-leaved crowfoot (Ranunculus omiophyllus), marsh violet and marsh thistle have been recorded.

Plants in surrounding grassland include lousewort, common milkwort, tormentil and heath bedstraw.

== Geology ==
Tor Royal Bog is situated on the granite massif of Dartmoor.

== Land ownership and management ==
All land within Tor Royal Bog SSSI is owned by the Duchy of Cornwall. The South West Peatland Partnership has been involved in peatland restoration at Tor Royal Bog SSSI.
