= Grenofen Wood and West Down =

Protected area in Devon, England

Coordinates: 50°30′53″N 4°08′17″W

Grenofen Wood and West Down is a Site of Special Scientific Interest (SSSI) within Tamar Valley National Landscape in Devon, England. It is located between Tavistock and Plymouth in the valley of the River Walkham and at its confluence with the River Tavy. This area is protected because of the diversity of lichen species in the woodland and otters occurring in the rivers.

== Biology ==
Woodland trees include pedunculate oak, sessile oak, silver birch, rowan, hazel and holly. Other plants include bilberry, alder buckthorn and opposite-leaved golden saxifrage. More than 80 species of lichen have been recorded in Grenofen Wood and lichen species include Parmelia horescens (genus Parmelia ), Cetrelia cetrarioides, Cladonia ochrochlora (Cladonia) and Dimerella diluta (Dimerella).

West Downs is an area of acidic grassland. This grassland supports butterfly species including high brown fritillary and pearl-bordered fritillary.

Bird species in this protected area include dipper and grey wagtail.

== Geology ==
Soils at this site are derived from slates of the Devonian period and in some parts of the site, these have been disturbed by past mining activities.
