= Halsdon nature reserve =

Protected area in Devon, England

Coordinates: 50°53′38″N 4°03′19″W

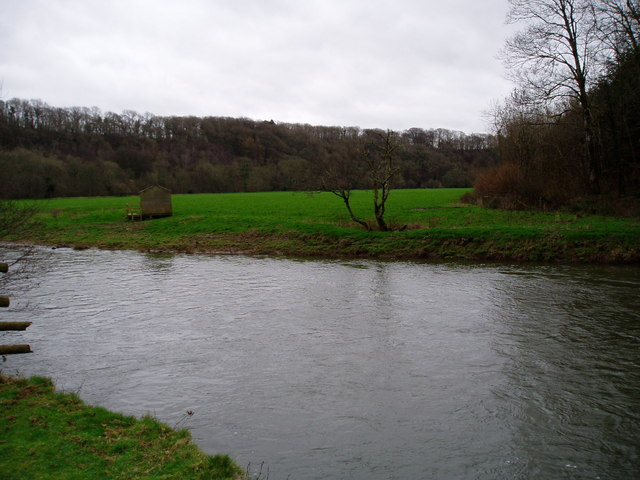
Halsdon Nature Reserve and SSSI next to the River Torridge.

Halsdon is a Site of Special Scientific Interest (SSSI) in Devon, England. This protected area is located between the villages Merton and Dolton and includes part of the valley of the River Torridge. The area is protected because of its ancient oak woodland and the bird species this supports.

== Biology ==
Habitats within Halsdon SSSI include woodland and marshy grassland. Tree species in the woodland include sessile oak and beech. Shrubs including holly, rowan, hazel and bilberry are also present. Herbaceous plants in the woodland include common cow-wheat, broad buckler-fern and hard-fern. On more nutrient-rich soil, tree species include ash, pedunculate oak, sycamore and downy birch and herbaceous plants include enchanter's nightshade and bugle. There are also several blocks of conifer plantation and Rhododendron ponticum is an invasive species in some areas.

Plant species in marshy grassland include meadowsweet, purple loosestrife and wild angelica. Butterfly species include purple hairstreak, silver-washed fritilary and speckled wood.

Bird species in this protected area include sparrowhawk, buzzard, wood warbler, pied flycatcher, kingfisher and dipper. Mammal species include water vole and otter.

== Geology ==
Slopes above the valley of the River Torridge are composed of slate, mudstone and siltstone from the Carboniferous period. This forms a thin and free-draining soil.

== Land ownership and management ==
After the estate of Halsdon (previously owned by the Furse family), was sold off, woodland was donated to the Devon Wildlife Trust. Devon Wildlife Trust owns part of Halsdon SSSI that it now manages.
