= Bovey Valley Woodlands =

Protected area in Devon, England

Coordinates: 50°37′05″N 3°44′41″W

Bovey Valley Woodlands is a Site of Special Scientific Interest (SSSI) within Dartmoor National Park in Devon, England. It is located 1.5 km west of the village of Lustleigh and includes the confluence between Becka Brook and the River Bovey near Pullabrook Wood. This area is protected because of the diversity of lichen species present and because of the presence of dormice.

The boundary of Bovey Valley Woodlands SSSI is contiguous with the boundary of Yarner Wood & Trendlebere Down SSSI and so forms part of a wider area of nature protection. Bovey Valley Woodlands SSSI also falls within East Dartmoor Woods and Heaths National Nature Reserve.

== Biology ==
The woodland has formed around historic field systems and common ground. Trees include sessile oak, pedunculate oak, silver birch, alder, ash, aspen and hazel. There are areas of neglected oak coppice. Woodland herbs include cow-wheat, wood sorrel, sanicle, primrose and dog's mercury. Dormice are found within this woodland.

Fern species include royal fern and Lemon-scented Fern. Tunrbidge Filmy-fern grows on streamside boulders. Lichen species on trees and boulders include Lobaria amplissima, Lobaria laetivirens, Lobaria pulmonaria (genus Lobaria), Carillaria pulverea, Nephroma parile, Lecanora piniperda, Thrombium epigaeum, Cetraria hepatizon and Massalongia carnosa. Moss species include Trichocolea tomentella and Hookeria lucens.

In areas of acid grassland, fern species include moonwort and adders-tongue fern.

Butterfly species include purple emperor and brown hairstreak.

Bird species in this protected area include buzzard, redstart, wood warbler, lesser spotted woodpecker, and pied flycatcher.

== Geology ==
Most of Bovey Valley Woodlands SSSI is situated over granite rock, and there are granite boulders at the surface. Some of the woodland grows on soils derived from Carboniferous slates.

== Land ownership ==
Parts of Bovey Valley Woodlands SSSI are owned and managed by the Woodland Trust. Woodlands within this protected area owned by the Woodland Trust include Pullabrook Wood (purchased in 1985), Hisley Wood (purchased in 1988) and Houndtor Wood (purchased in 2001).
