= Budleigh Salterton Cliffs =

Protected area in Devon, England

Coordinates: 50.625599°N 3.3302904°W

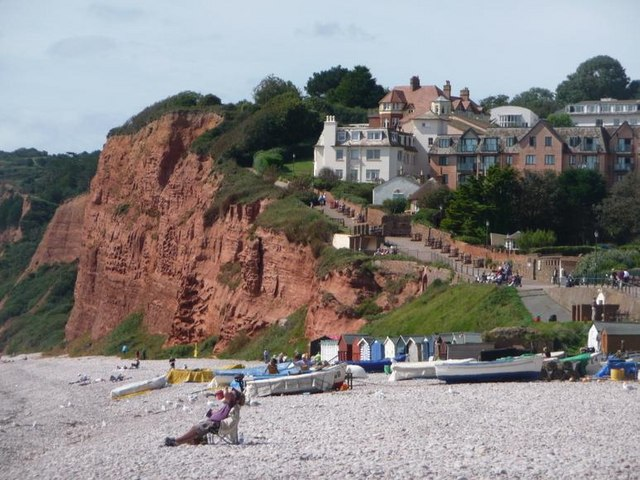
Budleigh Salterton Cliffs

Budleigh Salterton Cliffs is a Site of Special Scientific Interest (SSSI) protecting a stretch of coastline within East Devon National Landscape and within the Jurassic Coast World Heritage Site in Devon, England. It is located on the southern edge of the town of Budleigh Salterton. This area is protected because of the geological exposure of strata from the Triassic period.

== Geology ==
The Budleigh Salterton Pebble Beds is a conglomeration of pebbles that forms a 30m thick layer that is part of the Sherwood Sandstone Group. Some of the quartzite pebbles contain Ordovician and Devonian fossils. The upper section of the Budleigh Salterton Pebble Beds has thinner beds of conglomerate with a higher sand content. Immediately above the Budleigh Salterton Pebble Beds are the lower beds of the Otter Sandstone Formation. Some of the pebbles in the Otter Sandstone Formation show signs of abrasive erosion from wind-blown sand (pebbles known as dreikanter).

During the deposition of the Sherwood Sandstone Group the climate of this part of Britain was hot and dry. The conglomerates and sandstones of the Budleigh Salterton Pebble Beds were deposited in gravel-bedded rivers on an alluvial fan. This is a world famous site, with a section through fluvial conglomerates that is critical for understanding British Early Triassic palaeoenvironments and palaeogeography.

== Land ownership ==
All land within Budleigh Salterton Cliffs SSSI is owned by the local authority.
