= Shaugh Prior Woods =

Woodland in Devon, England

Coordinates: 50°27′17″N 4°03′36″W

Shaugh Prior Woods is a Site of Special Scientific Interest (SSSI) within Dartmoor National Park, Devon, England. It is located near the village of Shaugh Prior, 6km north of Plymouth. Shaugh Prior Woods are in the valleys of the River Plym and the River Meavy. This protected area includes an outcrop of granite called the Dewerstone. Some parts of the woodland in the protected area are known as Dewerstone wood. This woodland is protected because of the diversity of moss and lichen species recorded here.

== Biology ==
The dominant woodland tree is pedunculate oak that was previously managed as a coppice. Other tree species include beech and ash. Alder occurs along the river banks. Shrub species include hazel, holly, rowan, hawthorn and alder buckthorn. Herbaceous plants include bilberry, wood sorrel, heath bedstraw and greater woodrush. Fern species include male-fern, broad buckler-fern, scaly male-fern and hard fern. Tunbridge filmy-fern occurs near the rivers.

Lichen species include Arthonia didyma, Haematomma elatinum (genus: Haematomma), Pannaria pityrea (genus: Pannaria), Sticta limbata (genus: Sticta), Thelotrema lepadinum (genus: Thelotrema), Alectoria subcana and Alectoria fuscescens (genus: Alectoria), Porina coralloidea (genus: Porina), Enterographa hutchinsiae (Enterographa), Parmelia reddenda, Parmelia laevigata, Parmelia taylorensis, Parmelia endochlora, Ochrolechia androgyna (genus: Ochrolechia), Cladonia species, Sphaerophorus globosus and Graphina ruiziana.

Bird species recorded in this woodland include buzzard, tawny owl, great spotted woodpecker, nuthatch, dipper and grey wagtail.

== Geology ==
The underlying rocks are largely granite.

== Land ownership ==
Part of the land within Shaugh Prior Woods SSSI is owned by the National Trust. The National Trust use the name Shaugh Bridge.
