= Rushford Wood =

Protected area in Devon, England

Coordinates: 50°41′32″N 3°50′19″W

Rushford Wood is a Site of Special Scientific Interest (SSSI) in Dartmoor National Park in Devon, England. This area is located 3km south of the hamlet of Whiddon Down and is protected because of the diversity of its plants and lichen.

== Biology ==
Tree species in Rushford Wood include pedunculate oak, beech, silver birch and rowan. The shrub layer includes hazel, holly, hawthorn, crab apple and elder. Herbaceous plants include greater stitchwort, common cow-wheat, climbing corydalis, wood sorrel, enchanter's nightshade, yellow archangel and primrose.

More than 130 lichen species have been recorded at this site. Lichen species include Phylctis agelaea (genus Phylctis), Buellia erubescens, Coniocybe furfuracea, Catillaria atropurpurea (genus Catillaria) and Leptogium palmatum (genus Leptogium).

== Geology ==
Rushford Wood has acid soils, derived from granites of Permo-Carboniferous age.
