= Teign Valley Woods =

Woodland in Devon, England

Coordinates: 50°40′57″N 3°42′13″W

Teign Valley Woods is a Site of Special Scientific Interest (SSSI) within Dartmoor National Park in Devon, England. It is located 12km west of Exeter, 4km east of Moretonhamstead. The protected area encompasses part of the valley of the River Teign near Dunsford (this protected area was previously known as Dunsford and Cod woods). The protected area includes part of Bridford wood. The site is famous for its population of native daffodils and observations of otters.

== Biology ==
Woodland is dominated by pedunculate oak, some of which was historically coppiced. Herbaceous understorey includes bilberry and cow-wheat. There are heath areas where plants include heather, gorse, toadflax-leaved St John's wort and shepherd's cress.

Trees on the valley floor include alder, ash, hazel and wild service tree and herbs include native daffodils Narcissus pseudonarcissus.

Insect species in this protected area include wood cricket, the fly Callicera aenea and the butterflies marsh fritillary and high brown fritillary.

Bird species in this protected area include redstart, pied flycatcher, kingfisher and dipper. Mammal species in this protected area include Eurasian otter.

== Geology ==
The slopes of the valley of the River Teign have acidic soil derived from Caboniferous Culm Measures. Soils on the valley floor are less acidic.

== Land ownership ==
Most of the land within Teign Valley Woods SSSI is owned by the National Trust. Part of the protected area is managed by Devon Wildlife Trust which they refer to as Dunsford Nature Reserve.
