= Hense Moor Meadows =

Protected area in Devon, England

Coordinates: 50°51′21″N 3°10′34″W

Hense Moor Meadows is a Site of Special Scientific Interest (SSSI) within Blackdown Hills National Landscape, in Devon, England. It is located 500m north of the village of Luppitt, within the catchment of the River Otter. This area is protected because of its species-rich grassland and fen habitats.

Hense Moor Meadows SSSI is adjacent to another protected area called Hense Moor SSSI, and so forms part of a wider area of nature protection.

== Biology ==
Herbaceous plants in the areas where soil is free draining include lady’s mantle, cowslip, common spotted-orchid, green-winged orchid, corky-fruited water dropwort, common knapweed and meadow vetchling.

In fen habitat, plant species include meadowsweet, marsh valarian, marsh marigold, marsh pennywort, betony and devil's-bit scabious.

There is a stand of pedunculate oak and ash trees under which grow wood anemone and primrose.

== Geology ==
The underlying geology is Keuper Marl.
