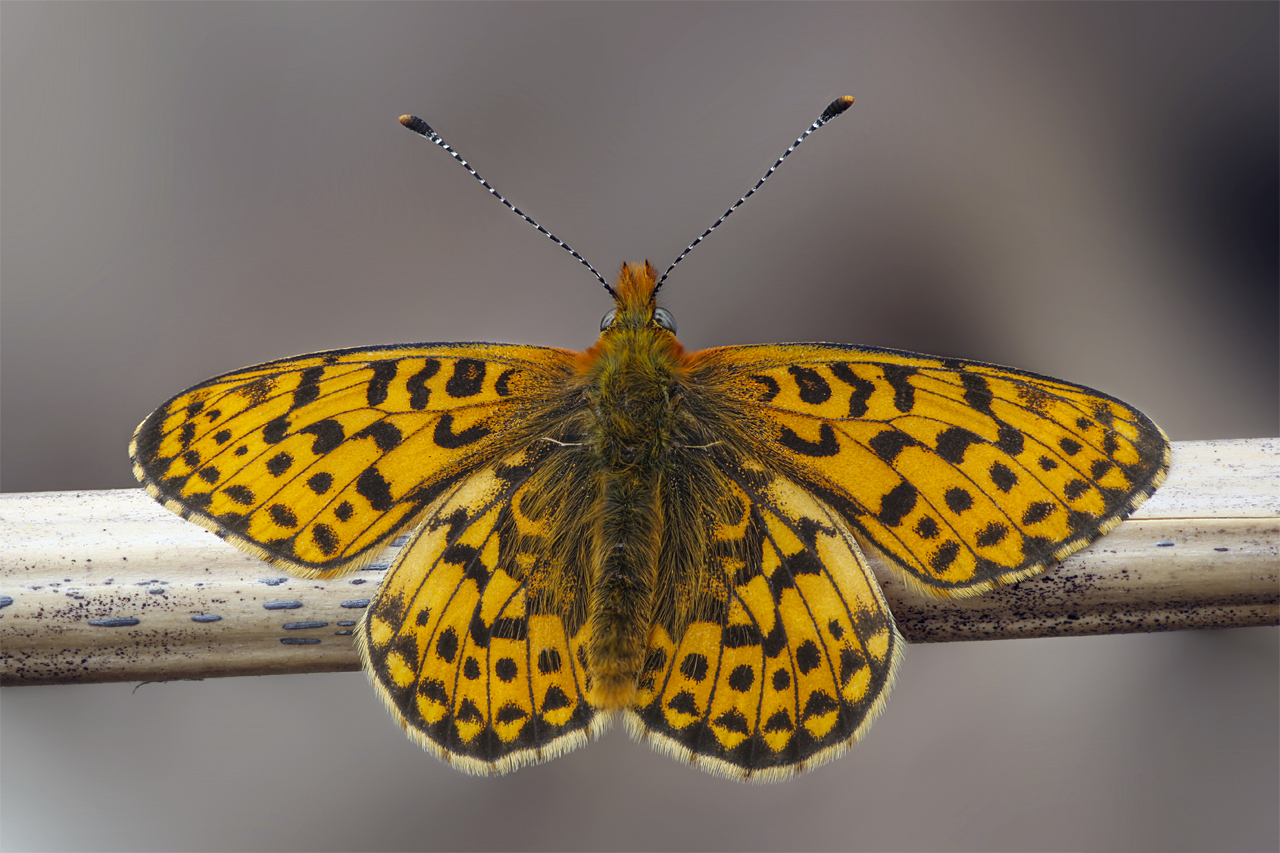

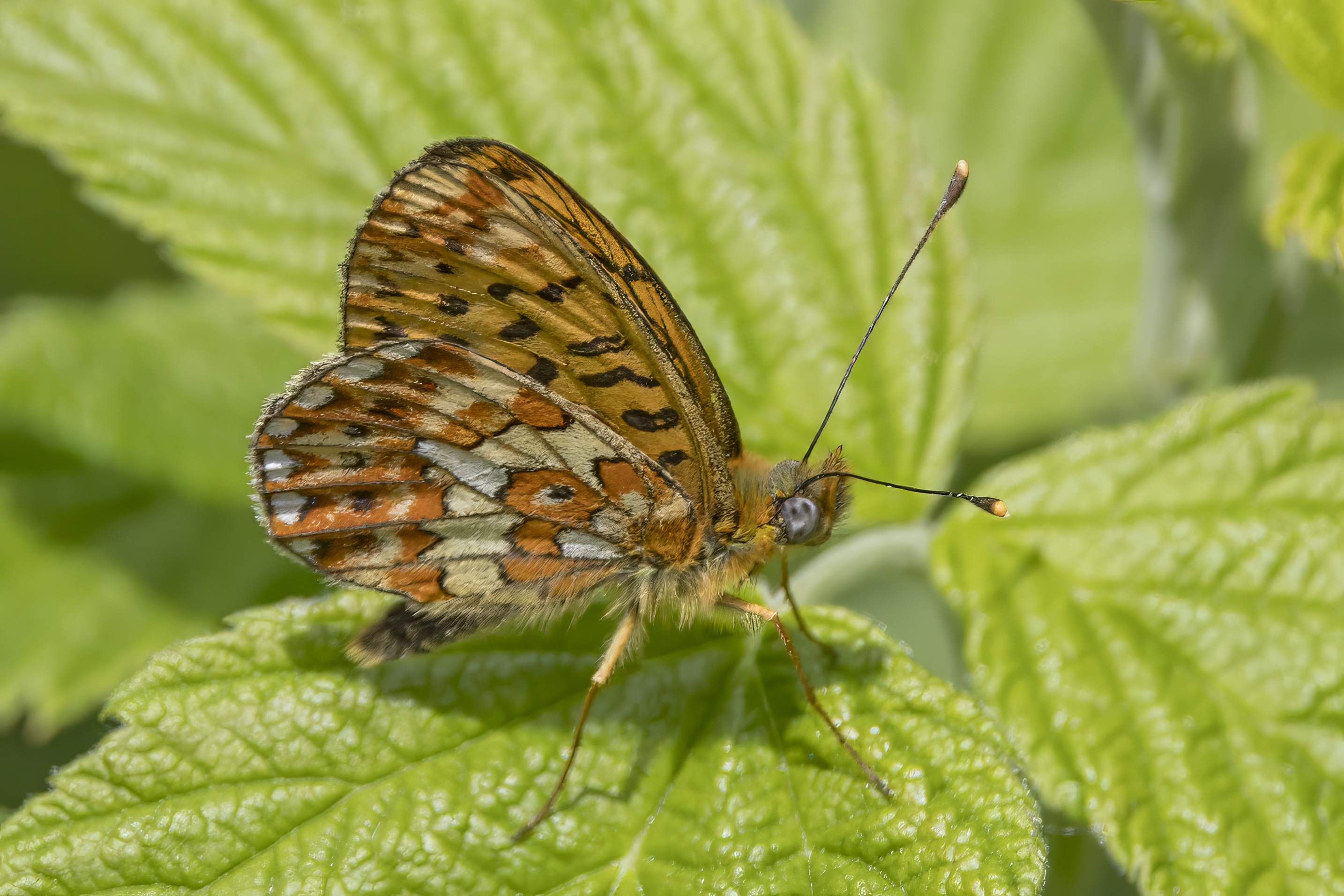

Scientific classification
- Kingdom: Animalia
- Phylum: Arthropoda
- Class: Insecta
- Order: Lepidoptera
- Family: Nymphalidae
- Genus: Boloria
- Species: B. euphrosyne

Binomial name
- Boloria euphrosyne (Linnaeus, 1758)

= Pearl-bordered fritillary =

Species of butterfly

The pearl-bordered fritillary (Boloria euphrosyne) is a butterfly of the family Nymphalidae found in Europe and through Russia across the Palearctic to the north of Kazakhstan.

== Description ==
The adult butterfly is orange with black spots on the upperside of its wing and has a wingspan of 38–46 mm. The underside of the wings have a row of silver-pearly markings along the edge, which give the species its name. The pearl-bordered fritillary is often confused with the small pearl-bordered fritillary, but can be distinguished by the triangle along its pearl border (the small pearl-bordered has black chevrons) as well as the presence of a single silver spot in the middle of a row of yellow spots. The female has darker markings and rounder wings than the male. The caterpillars are black with white or yellow spines along their backs.

Like other species of fritillary, the males have special scent glands on their wings so that they can be recognised by females of their own species and therefore find a suitable partner.

=== Description in Seitz ===
A. euphrosyne L. (= niobe Mull.) (67h). Very similar to the preceding species, especially selene, but brighter red and the black markings thinner in typical specimens. Easily recognized by the hindwing beneath, which is bright brick-red at the base, not brown as in selene, the median band bearing only one silver-spot (across the apex of the cell) and the incomplete silvery band in the distal area being replaced by some yellow smears without any silvery gloss. The silvery marginal spots of the hindwing beneath are but very rarely absent.

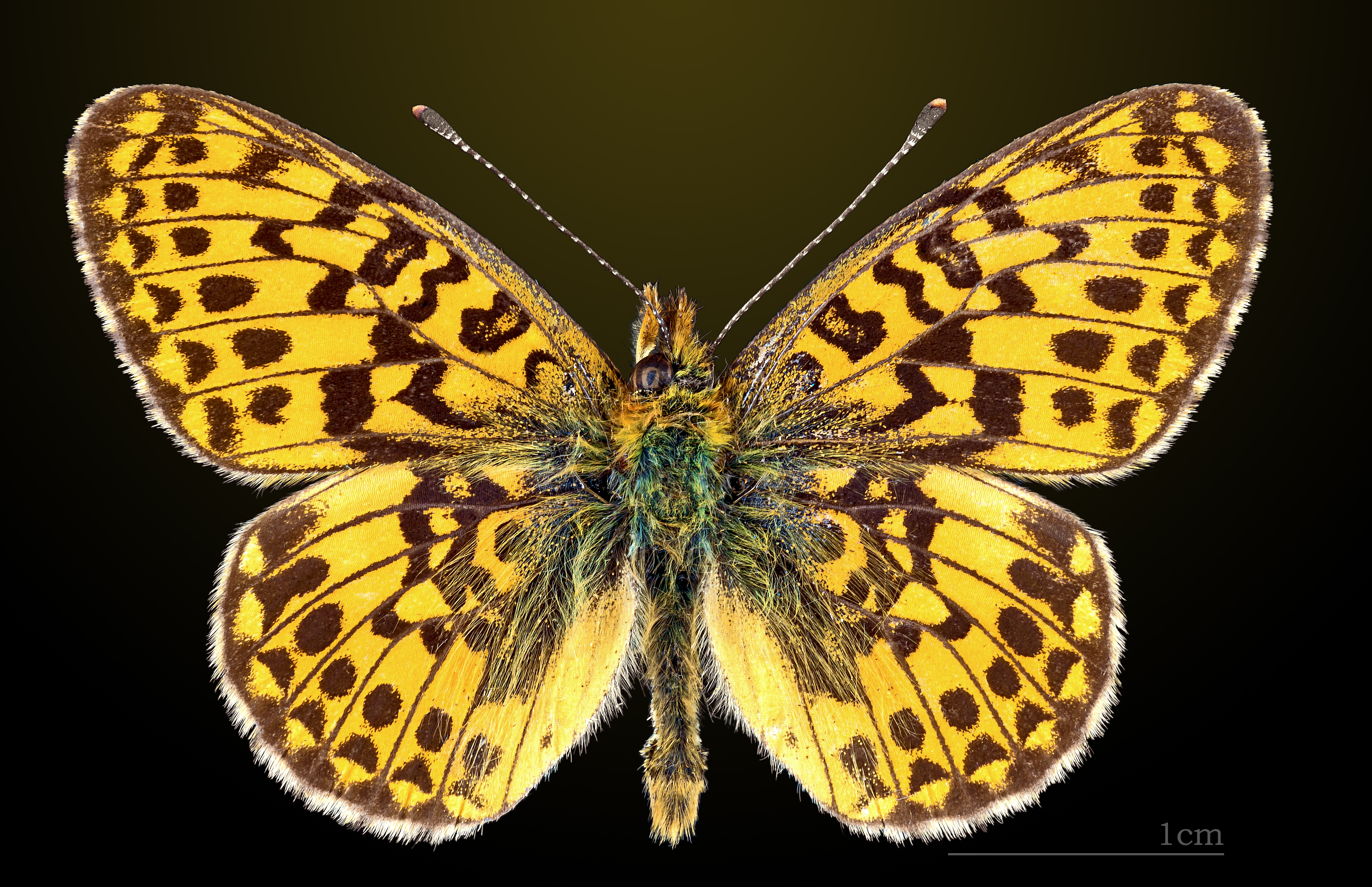
Dorsal side

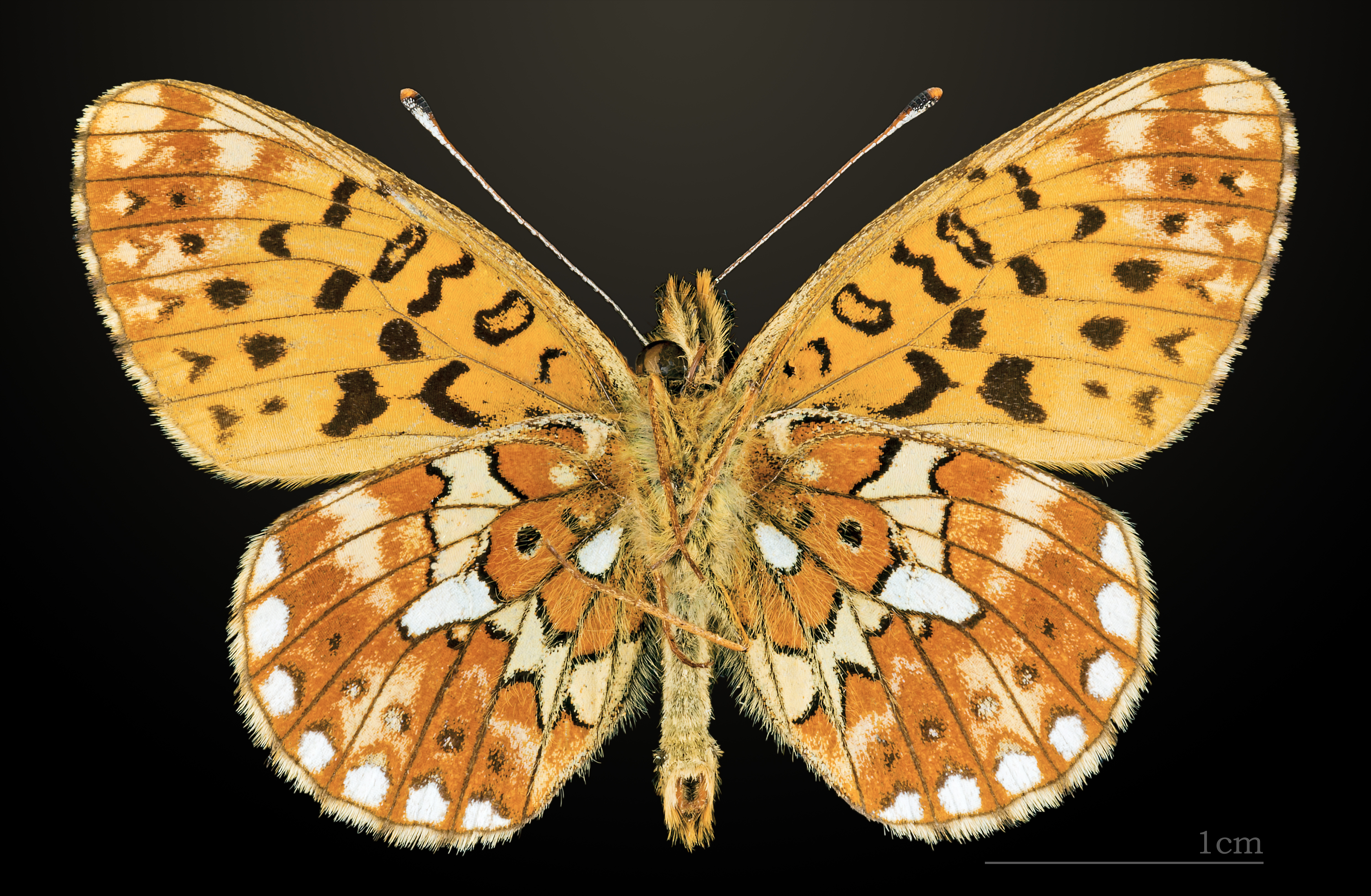
Ventral side

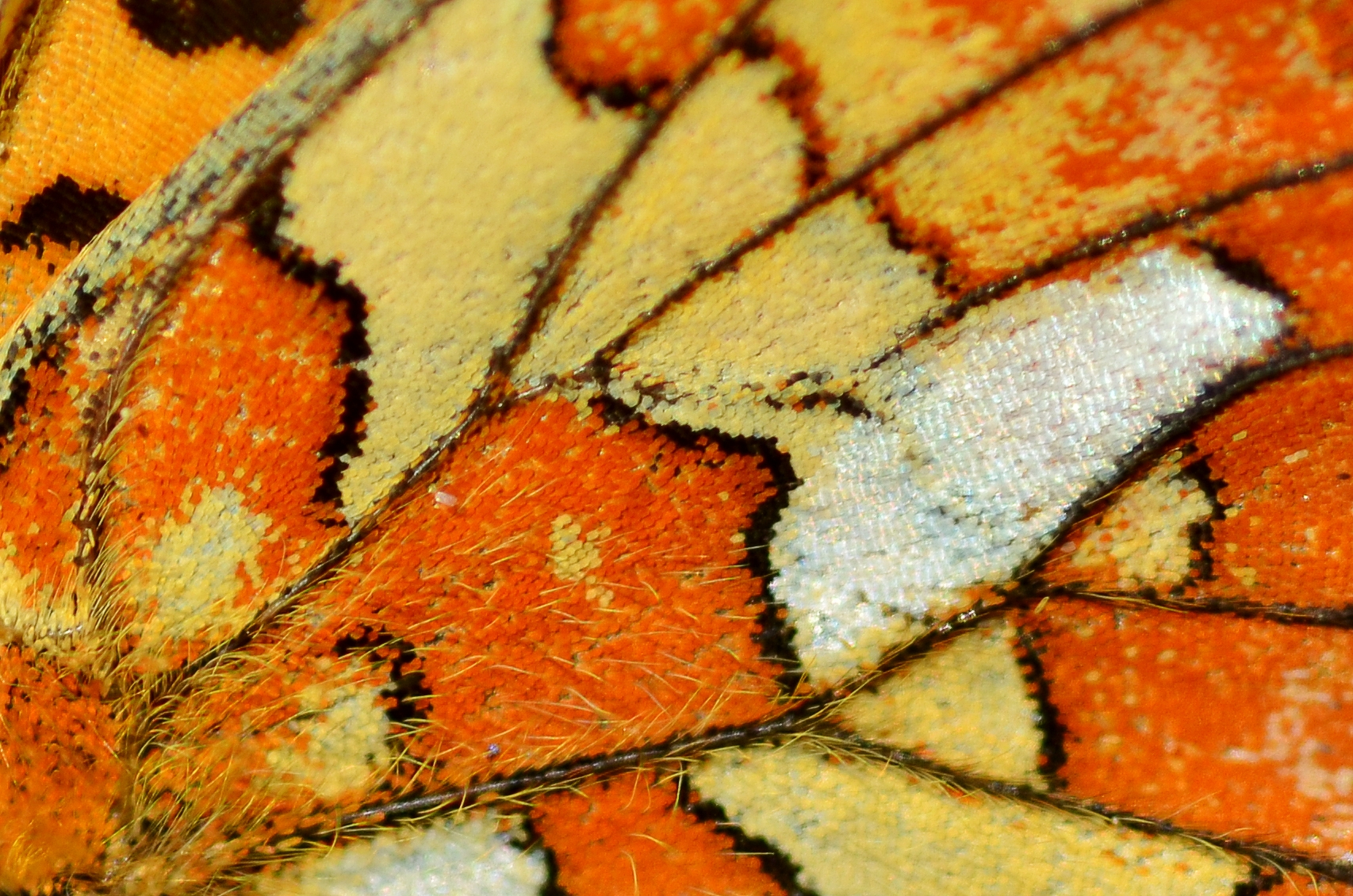
Close-up of wing scales

== Distribution ==
The pearl-bordered fritillary is widespread throughout Europe, ranging from Scandinavia to northern Spain and from Ireland eastwards across the Palearctic to Russia and to the north of Kazakhstan. In England and Wales (plus another 10 countries) it has declined rapidly in number and is a highly threatened species.

== Subspecies ==
- B. e. euphrosyne – Central Europe, Siberia
- B. e. fingal (Herbst, 1804) – Northern Europe, Siberia
- B. e. rusalka (Fruhstorfer, 1909) – Southern Europe, West Siberia
- B. e. orphana (Fruhstorfer, 1907) – Transbaikalia, Amur, Ussuri
- B. e. kamtschadalus (Seitz, [1909]) – Kamchatka, North Sakhalin
- B. e. umbra (Seitz, [1909]) – Altai, Sayan
- B. e. dagestanica (Sovinsky, 1905) – Caucasus, Transcaucasia
- B. e. nephele (Herrich-Schäffer, [1847]) – Urals, Siberia

== Lifecycle ==
=== Food plants and eggs ===
After mating, the female will lay her eggs on dead bracken (Pteridium aquilinum), or leaf litter near to violet plants – common dog–violet (Viola riviniana), heath dog–violet (Viola canina) or marsh violet (Viola palustris). Sometimes eggs are laid on the leaves of the food plant itself. They are laid singly, not in one large group such as the marsh fritillary. The habitat mosaics they prefer are typically one–third grass and two–thirds bracken.

Eggs can be found on the food plant from mid–May to the end of June. They are a pale yellow and can hatch after 10–14 days.

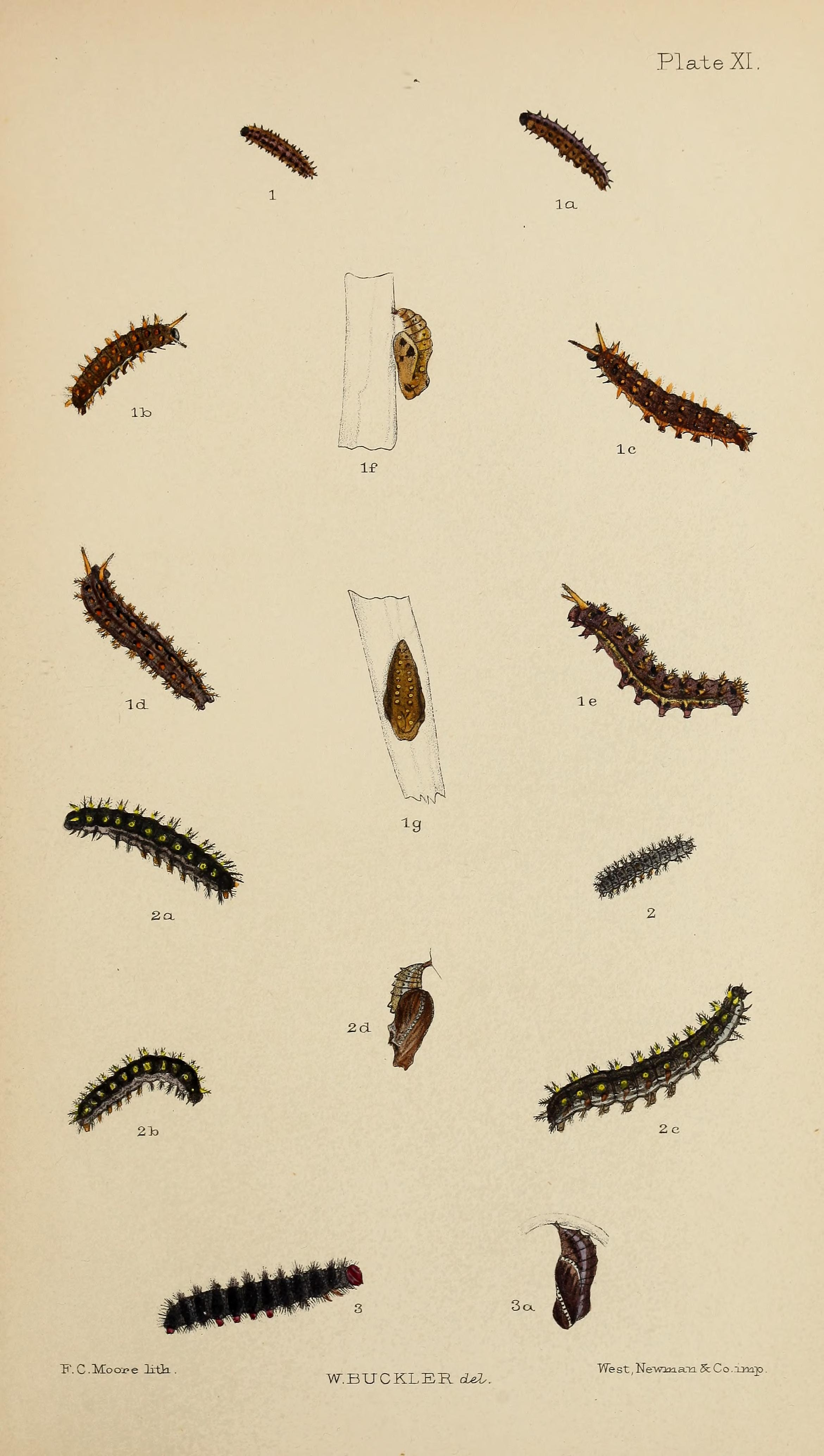
Figs 2 larva after 2nd moult 2b larva after 3rd moult 2a, 2c larva after 4th moult 2d pupa

=== Caterpillar, pupa, and adult ===
The emerging caterpillars begin feeding immediately and will moult three times within the first 5–6 weeks. Each caterpillar will then hibernate in a shriveled leaf at the base of the plant, usually moving to the hibernation site at the end of July. The caterpillars lose half of their body mass by the time the emerge in the following March. After a period of feeding and growth, during which it moults one last time, the caterpillar is full size and ready to pupate. The chrysalis stage is formed among the leaf litter, and lasts just 10–14 days.

The adult butterfly flies between late April and June, and is one of the earliest fritillaries to emerge. Adults feed on the nectar from early spring flowers such as bugle, dandelion, and lesser celandine.

There is a second brood during August.

== Habitat ==
- Woodland clearings, recently coppiced or clear-felled, with bracken, or leaf litter provided by oak and bramble
- Well-drained habitats with mosaics of grass, bracken, and light scrub
- Hot and freshly cut material
- Abundant food plants growing in short, sparse vegetation, where there is abundant dead plant material, bracken is preferred
- Scrub edges can provide good breeding conditions, e.g. gorse

== Management ==
- A network of paths running through bracken to open the canopy, allows sunlight through to help germinate any violet food plants. This can be achieved through grazing especially during winter and early spring. Cattle are better than sheep as their extra weight helps to trample and break up any dense standing dead stems. Also there is a risk that sheep tend to eat plants, (for example Ajuga reptans/bugle), that provide nectar for the adult pearl-bordered fritillary. Another way of achieving this is by cutting and bruising the bracken, a proportion of the site at a time, during May and early June.
- Burning can be useful for reducing the litter of bracken, although follow up management is required as extra bracken growth will be stimulated as a result. This will kill a proportion of invertebrates, and therefore only burning a proportion of the site, e.g., 20% is suggested.
- Spraying can be useful for reducing high densities of bracken litter, but care should be taken to not severely reduce the density and allow the grass to develop, as this will harm the breeding habitat.
- Woodlands create sunny clearings and rides, but avoid using clearings that are dominated by other plants such as dog's mercury (Mercurialis perennis), common bluebell, and vigorous grasses.

== Ecology ==
The Pearl-bordered fritillary (Boloria Euphrosyne) is a key indicator species for well-maintained open woodlands. It is one of the first butterflies to appear in spring, making it an early sign of a healthy habitat.

The butterfly’s caterpillars rely on common dog violet (Viola riviniana) and other violet species for food, thriving in recently cleared or sunlit areas. These specific habitat needs make the species particularly sensitive to environmental changes.

Adult fritillaries are strong fliers, preferring warm, sheltered grasslands, woodland clearings, and meadows with plenty of nectar sources. Their dependence on carefully managed landscapes highlights the importance of conservation efforts to maintain their populations.

== Example sites where found ==
- Stansted Park, West Sussex, UK
- Haldon Forest, Devon, UK
- Lambert's Castle Hill, Dorset, UK
- Hard Hills, Cornwall, UK grid ref SS 235176
- Ireland
