= Southey and Gotleigh Moors =

Protected site for nature conservation in the United Kingdom

- Site of Special Scientific Interest
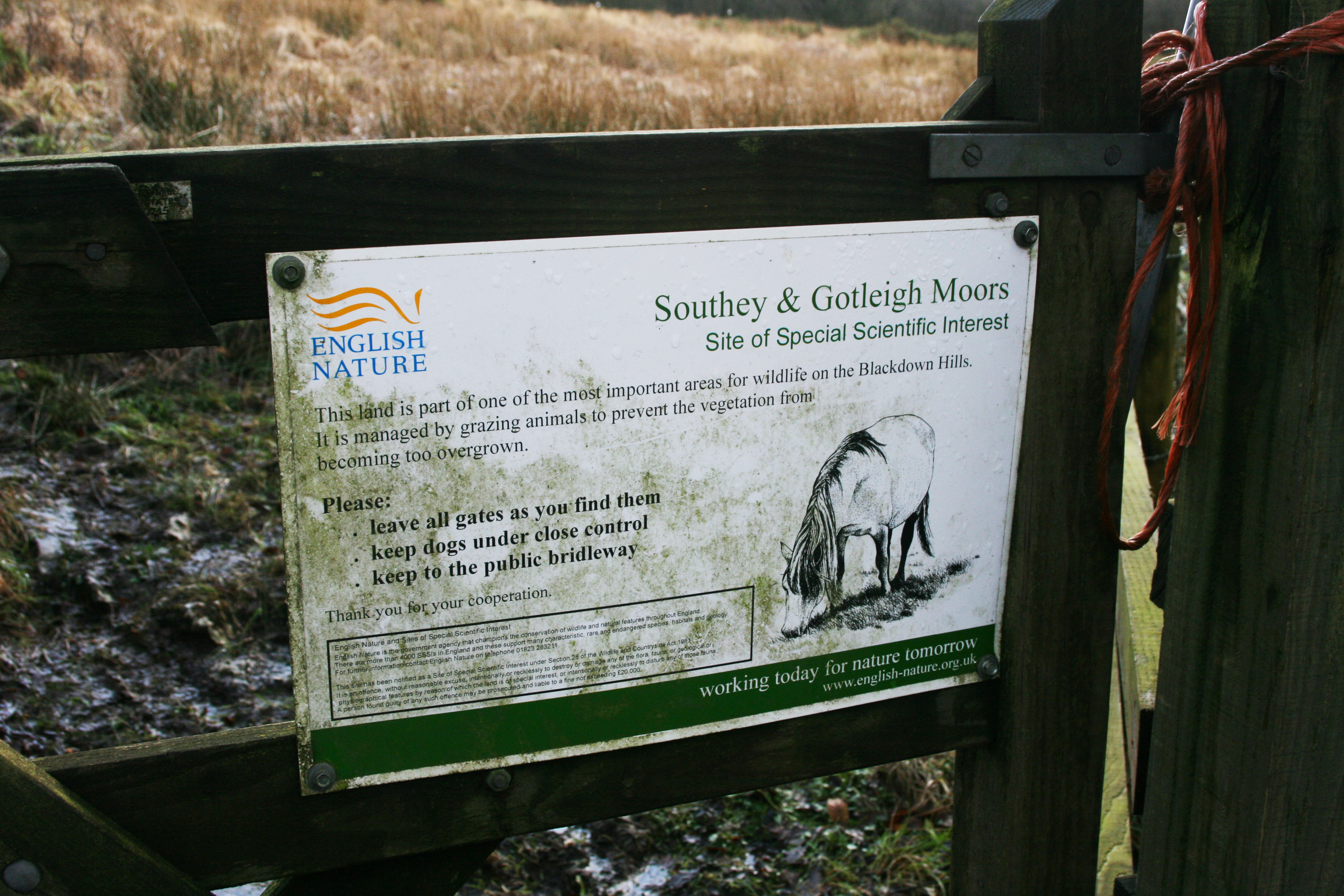

- Location within Somerset
- Location of Southey and Gotleigh Moors.
- Area of search: Somerset and Devon
- Grid reference: ST192110
- Coordinates: 50.89281°N 3.15020°W
- Interest: Biological
- Area: 81.3 hectares (0.813 km^{2}; 0.314 sq mi)
- Notification date: 1998

Southey and Gotleigh Moors (grid reference ST192110) is an 81.3 hectare (200.1 acre) biological Site of Special Scientific Interest on the Blackdown Hills in Somerset, notified in 1988.

Southey and Gotleigh Moors is a mosaic of valley mire, acid-marsh grassland and alder-birch carr. The diversity of the site is enhanced by the presence of the Bolham River and small areas of standing water which increase the amphibian and invertebrate interest. The nationally scarce leaf beetle (Phyllobrotica quadrimaculata) has been found here.
