= Nymet Barton Marsh =

Protected area in Devon, England

Coordinates: 50°47′45″N 3°48′32″W

Nymet Barton Marsh is a Site of Special Scientific Interest (SSSI) in Devon, England. It is located between the villages of Bow and Nymet Tracey. This protected area contains wetland habitat around a tributary to the River Yeo. This area is protected because of the wetland plants present in this habitat.

Nymet Barton Marsh SSSI is mentioned within the Mid Devon Landscape Character Assessment Review as one of the special qualities of Mid Devon.

== Biology ==
Plants around this marsh include meadowsweet, ragged robin, marsh marigold, fen bedstraw, marsh valerian, water mint, water horsetail and wood clubrush. Beneath patches covered by alder trees, hemlock water-dropwort and broad buckler-fern have been recorded. The butterfly species called marsh fritilary has also been recorded at this site.

== Geology ==
Soils composed of clays here are derived from the underlying sandstone layer from the Permian period.
