= Lady's Wood and Viaduct Meadow =

Protected area in Devon, England

Coordinates: 50°25′01″N 3°51′01″W

Lady's Wood and Viaduct Meadow (sometimes referred to as Ladieswood), is a Site of Special Scientific Interest (SSSI) within Dartmoor National Park, in Devon, England. It is located 1.5km west of the village of South Brent. This protected area is close to the railway track of the Exeter to Plymouth line and is located 5km east of Ivybridge railway station. This area is protected because the grassland and woodland here contains an assemblage of plants unusual for south Devon and because a population of dormice have been recorded here.

== Biology ==
Tree species in the woodland include pedunculate oak and ash. Hazel is also found in this woodland and has been managed using coppicing. Herbaceous plants in the woodland include primrose, early purple orchid, wood anemone, moschatel and pignut.

Plant species in the meadow include lady's mantle, heath spotted-orchid, southern marsh orchid, meadowsweet and ragged robin.

Insect species in this protected area include scarlet tiger moth.

== Geology ==
The silty soils of this site come from the underlying shale rocks from the Middle Devonian period.

== Management ==
This protected area is managed by Devon Wildlife Trust. Lady's Wood is the first protected area for which Devon Wildlife Trust became responsible for management. The site was gifted to Devon Wildlife Trust by the naturalist HG Hurrell (Henry George Hurrell).
