= Dunnabridge Meadows =

Protected area in Devon, England

Coordinates: 50.5534°N 3.9145°W

Dunnabridge Meadows is a Site of Special Scientific Interest (SSSI) in Dartmoor National Park in Devon, England. It is located 3 kilometres (2 mi) west of Dartmeet and is located within the valley of the River Dart. This area has several meadows and is protected because of the population of greater butterfly orchid seen here.

== Biology ==
Dunnabridge Meadows are grasslands on alkaline soils. Plant species in this protected area include greater butterfly orchid and greater burnet.

== Land ownership ==
All land within Dunnabridge Meadows SSSI is owned by the Duchy of Cornwall.
