= Whiteleigh Meadows =

UK protected area

Coordinates: 50°48′18″N 4°14′51″W

Whiteleigh Meadows is a Site of Special Scientific Interest in Devon, England, east of Holsworthy. It was designated as a protected area in 1987 because of its plant diversity in unimproved grassland. It is dominated by Dactylorhiza maculata, the heath spotted orchid.

Although Whiteleigh Meadows was a subject of the court case brought when Natural England discovered unauthorised grazing of livestock at the site, parts of the land area is owned by the Forestry Commission.
