= Hense Moor =

Protected area in Devon, England

Coordinates: 50°51′59″N 3°10′24″W

Hense Moor is a Site of Special Scientific Interest (SSSI) within Blackdown Hills National Landscape, in Devon, England. It is located 800m north of the village of Luppitt. This protected area was established because of the peatland and wet heath habitats present on Hense Moor.

== Biology ==
Plant species within wet heath include cross-leaved heath, round leaved sundew, long-leaved sundew, heath-spotted orchid and lousewort. At sites of fluvial springs, plant species include bog asphodel, bog St John's-wort, pale butterwort, great sundew and bog pimpernel. Plants in acid marshy grassland include marsh helleborine and meadowsweet.

Trees along wooded streams include alder, goat willow and pedunculate oak. Herbaceous species near these streams include golden saxifrage, ramsons and enchanter's nightshade.

Raft spider has been recorded at this protected area.

After introduction at the River Otter in 2008, beavers have taken up residence on Hense Moor. Beaver dams have been seen within the woodland present at Hense Moor.

== Geology ==
Soils in valley bottoms are derived from Keuper Marl.

== Management ==
Hense Moor SSSI forms a cornerstone in the Luppitt Landscape Recovery Project (an element of an Environmental Land Management scheme, ELM, supported by the Department of Environment, Food and Rural Affairs). Luppitt has 617 acres of common land, spread across four main sections– Luppitt Common, Hartridge Common, Hense Moor and Dumpdon Hill. Luppitt Common, Hartridge Common and Hense Moor belong to the Luppitt Commons company as a result of a sale to the commoners in 1960.
