= Scabbacombe =

Protected area in Devon, England

Coordinates: 50°21′32″N 3°31′30″W

Scabbacombe is a Site of Special Scientific Interest (SSSI) in Devon, England. It is located 3 km south of Brixham and 3 km east of Kingswear. This protected area is cliff top field where there is an especially rare (in Britain) perennial plant species, field eryngo.

This protected area has historically had the name: Berry Head to Froward Point

== Biology ==
The site is a grass field dominated by rye-grass. There are several populations of field eryngo in this protected area.

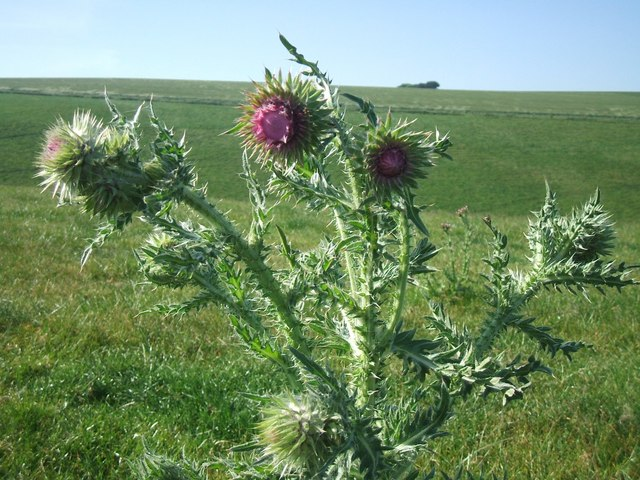
Unidentified thistle on the down

== Geology ==
The rocks underlying this protected area are Devonian slates and siltstones providing well-drained soil.

== Land ownership ==
Most of the land within Scabbacombe SSSI is owned by the National Trust.
