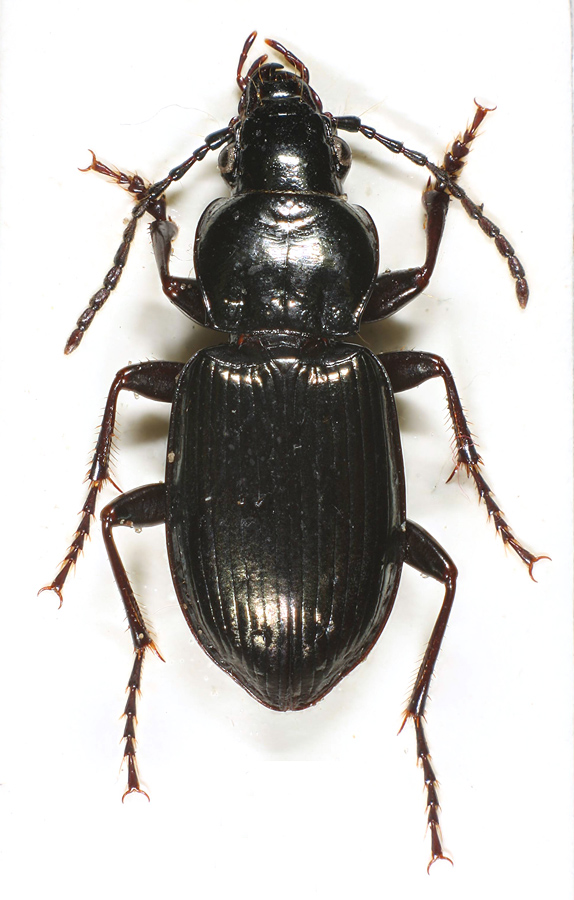

Scientific classification
- Kingdom: Animalia
- Phylum: Arthropoda
- Clade: Pancrustacea
- Class: Insecta
- Order: Coleoptera
- Suborder: Adephaga
- Family: Carabidae
- Subfamily: Pterostichinae
- Tribe: Pterostichini
- Genus: Pterostichus
- Species: P. oblongopunctatus

Binomial name
- Pterostichus oblongopunctatus (Fabricius, 1787)

= Pterostichus oblongopunctatus =

Species of beetle

Pterostichus oblongopunctatus is a species of ground beetle native to Europe.
