= Blackslade Mire =

Protected area in Devon, England

Coordinates: 50°34′12″N 3°46′48″W

Blackslade Mire is a Site of Special Scientific Interest (SSSI) within Dartmoor National Park, Devon, England. It is located near Pil Tor, 2km east of the village Widecombe in the moor. It is 800m from Emsworthy Mire. It is protected because of the wet heath and peatland habitats present.

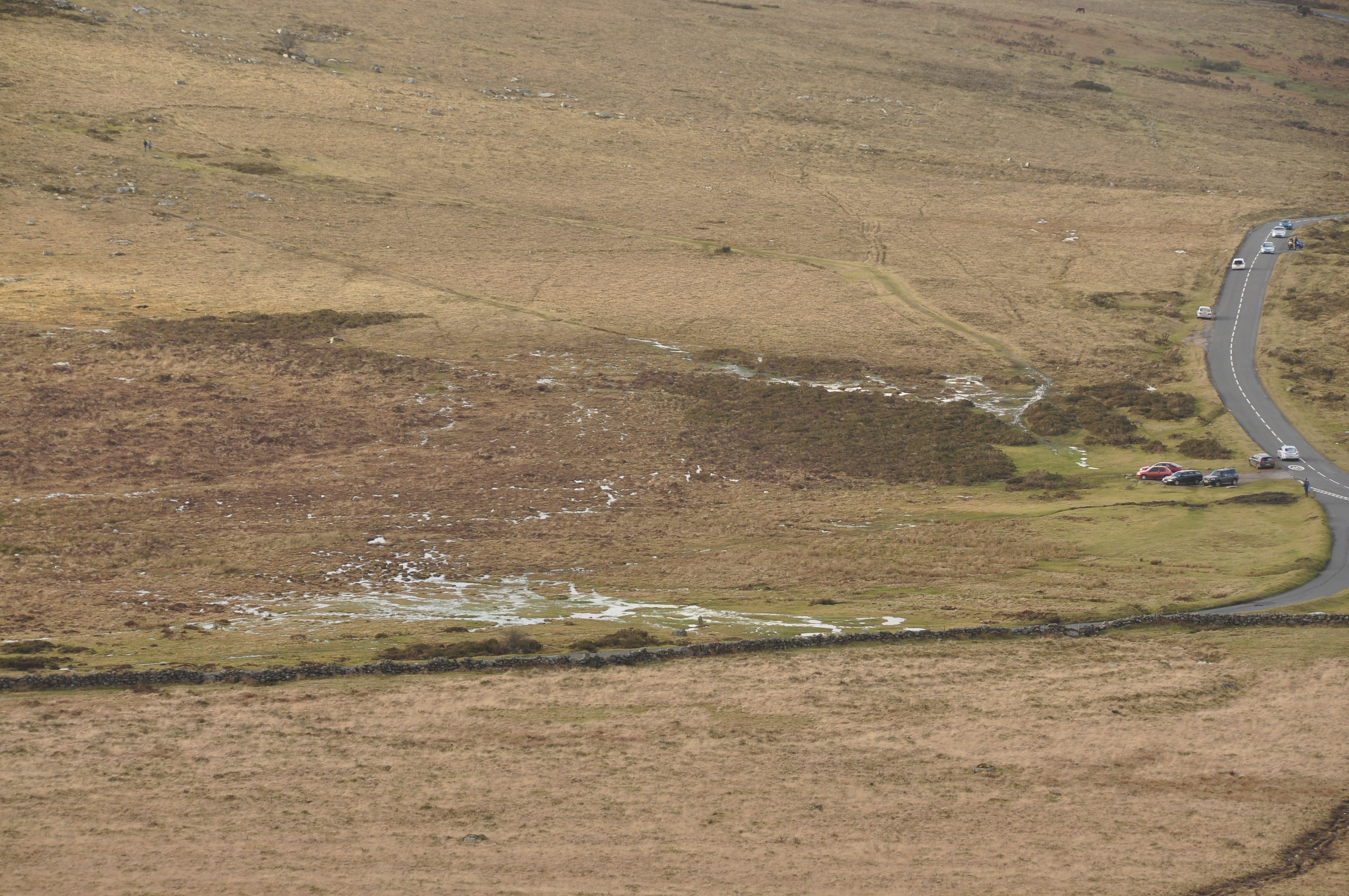
Viewed from Rippon Tor

== Biology ==
The peatland habitat has open bog pools. Moss species include Sphagnum recurvum, Sphagnum auriculatum, Sphagnum papillosum, Sphagnum capillifolium and Sphagnum pulchrum. Herbaceous plants include bog asphodel, round-leaved sundew, bog pimpernel and pale butterwort. Aquatic plants in the bog pools include Potamogeton polygonifolius, bogbean, marsh pennywort, marsh lousewort, marsh St John's-wort and floating club-rush.

Plants in the wet heath include gorse, heather and cross-leaved heath.
