= Devon United Mine =

Coordinates: 50.59644°N 4.09106°W

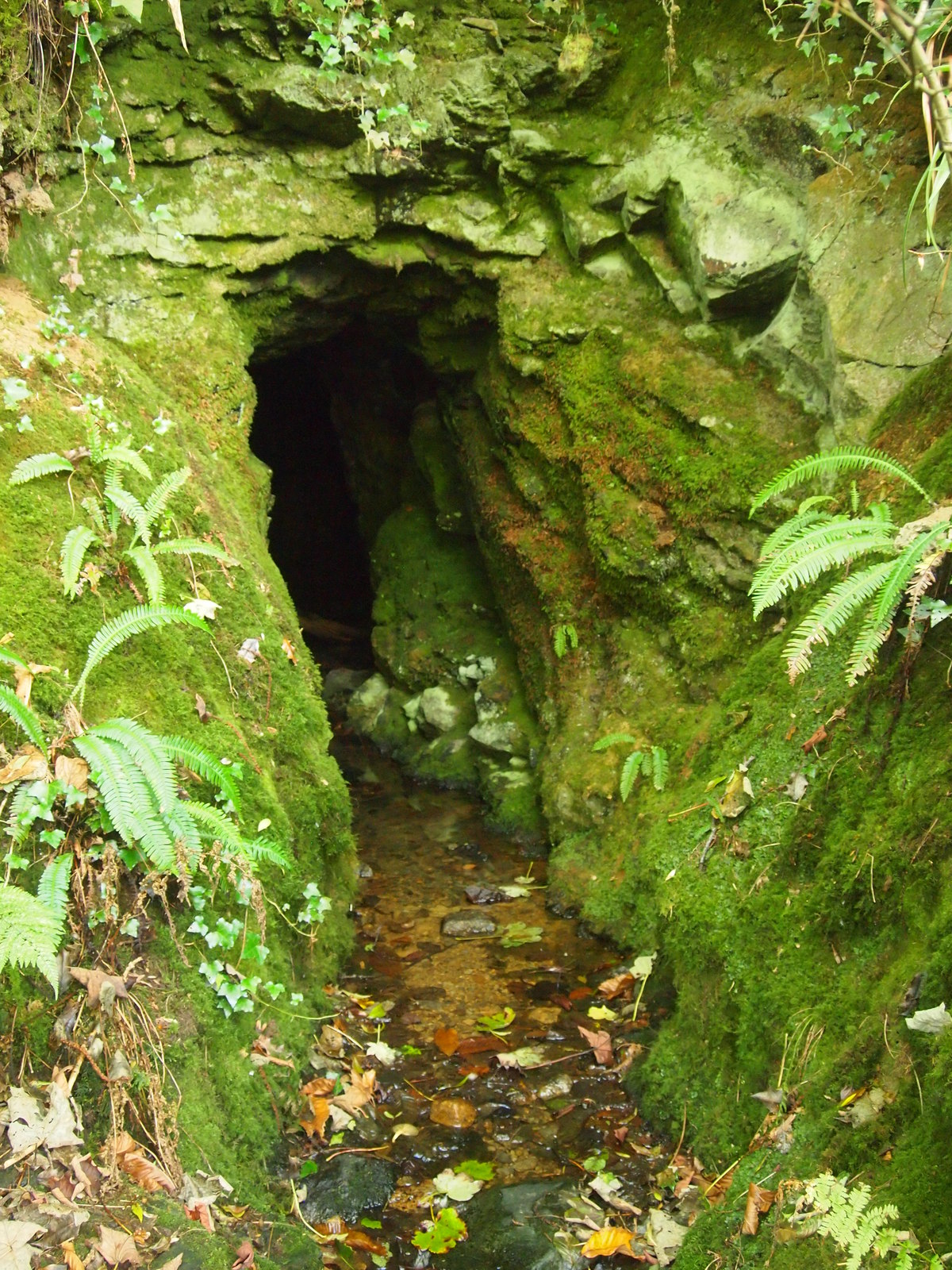
Adit at Devon United Mine

Devon United Mine (grid reference SX521795) is a 1.0 hectare geological Site of Special Scientific Interest in Devon, England, notified in 1987.

== Sources ==
- English Nature citation sheet for the site (accessed 22 July 2006)
