= Babbacombe Cliffs =

Protected area in Devon, England

Coordinates: 50.479519°N 3.5094127°W

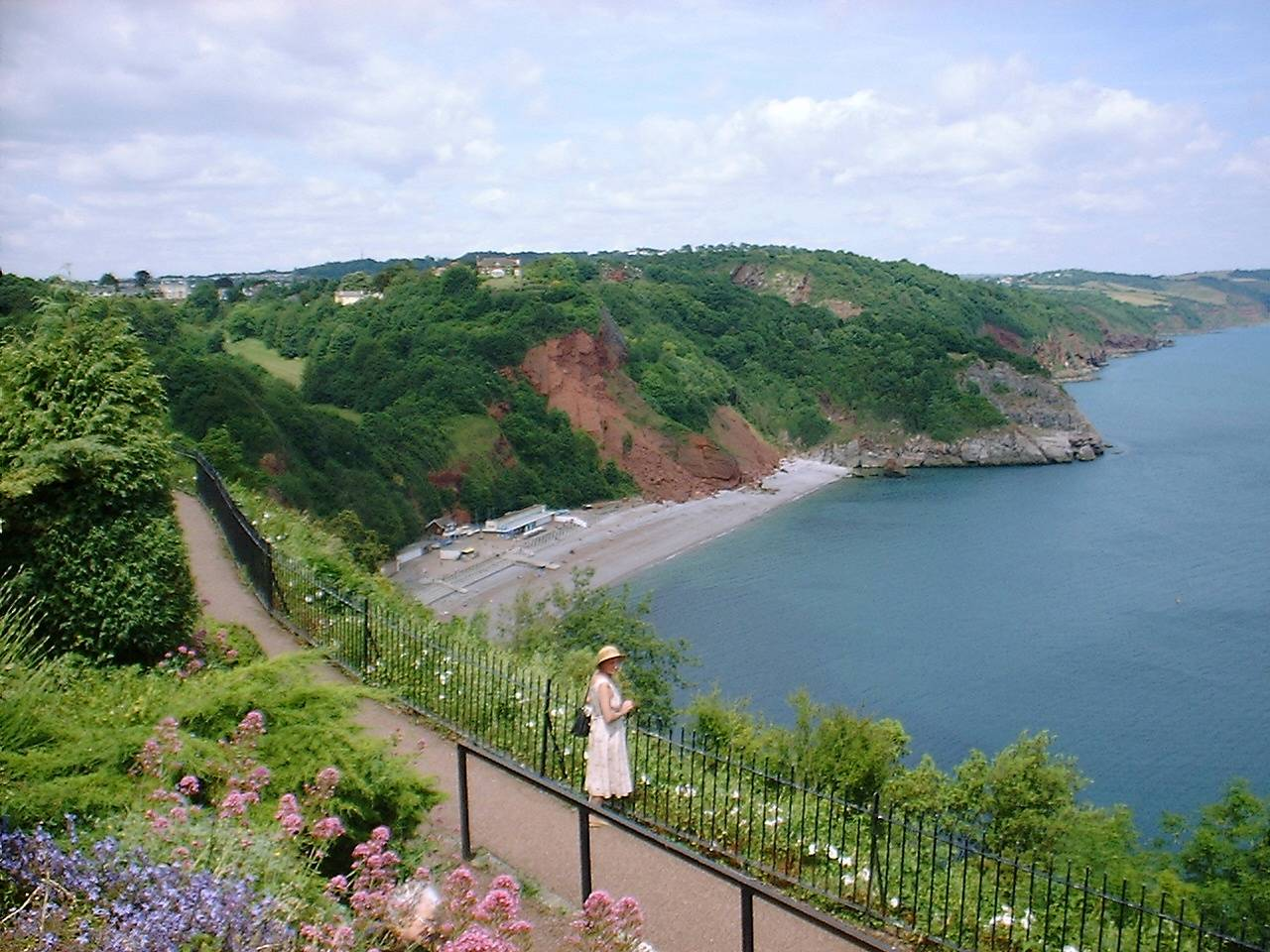
Babbacombe Cliffs

Babbacombe Cliffs is a Site of Special Scientific Interest (SSSI) in Devon, England. It is located north of the town of Babbacombe and is a coastline below Babbacombe Down that has Devonian geology and faces Babbacombe Bay. This area is protected because of the geological stratigraphy present in these cliffs. Babbacombe Cliffs SSSI is within the English Riviera UNESCO Global Geopark.

The Babbacome Cliff Railway crosses this protected area.

== Geology ==
Babbacombe Cliffs is a location where breccia deposits of the Permian period (Oddicombe Breccias) are faulted against limestones of the Devonian period. The breccia deposits have been used to interpret the direction of fluvial transport of sediments. Some of the rock types at Babbacombe Cliffs contain ammonoid cephalopods that indicate deep sea conditions in geological history. The site also includes a cavity and fissure system cut into the limestone that is filled by Permian sandstones and siltstones.

In the south of this protected area is the location of the type section of Babbacombe Shales which are known for fossilised molluscs called goniatids of early Frasnian age (Devonian period). Another rock strata present in this protected area is Barton Limestone.

== Land ownership ==
All land in Babbacombe Cliffs SSSI is owned by the local authority.
