= Western King =

Protected area in Devon, England

Coordinates: 50.359461°N 4.1635828°W

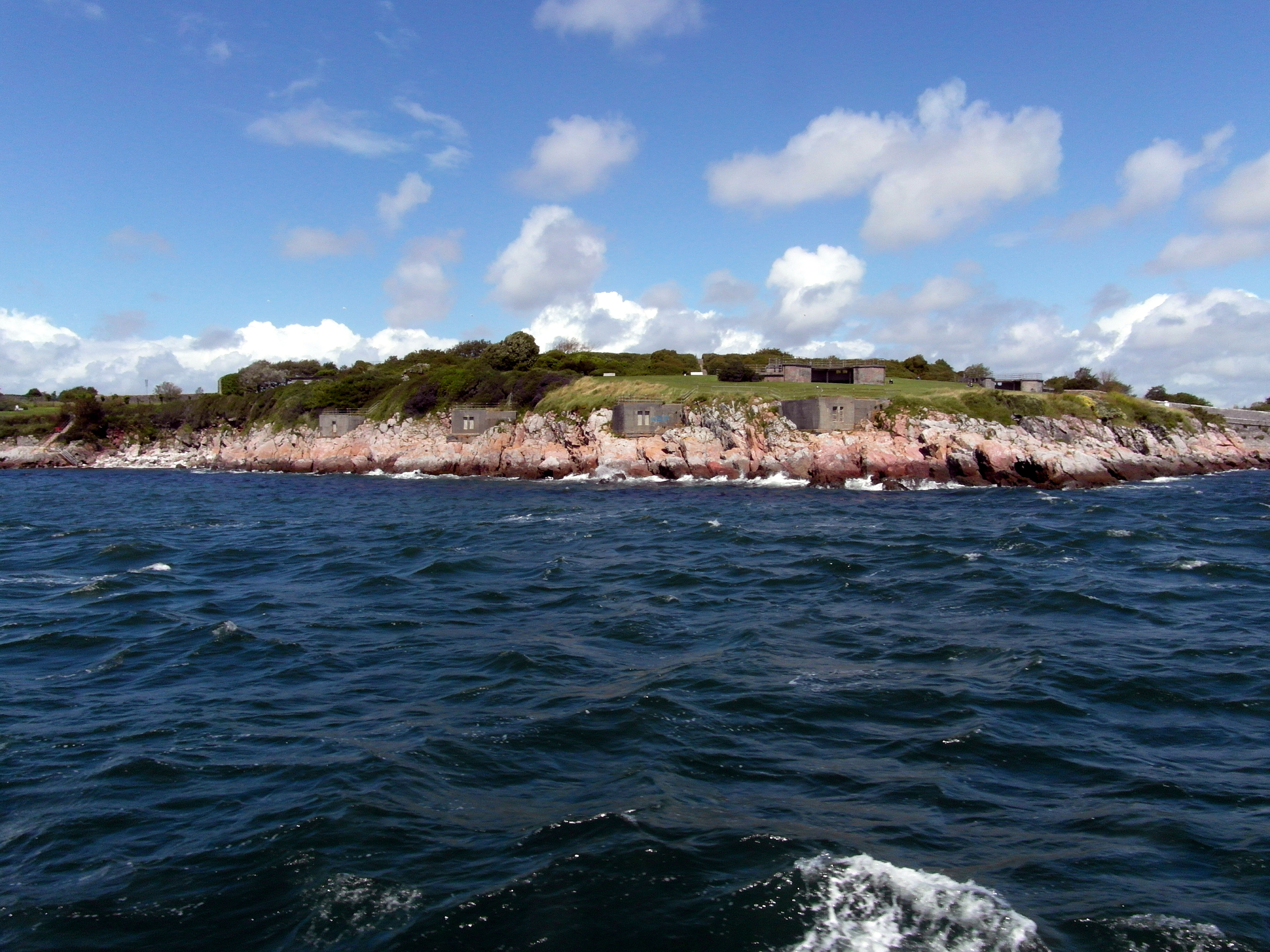
Western King

Western King is a Site of Special Scientific Interest (SSSI) in Devon, England. It is located on Devil's Point, near Devil's Point Car Park and Royal William Yard, south of Stonehouse in the city of Plymouth. This site is protected because the cliff here exposes limestone rocks from the Devonian period. Any fossils found at the site must not be collected but left for others to study.

This protected area is adjacent to the historic military fort known as Western King's Redoubt.

== Geology ==
Microfossils known as conodonts found here have been important for interpreting biostratigraphy. These microfossils are located in the mudstones that accumulate in fissures within the limestone. Some of the first studies of Devonian fossil corals in Britain were undertaken at Western King.

== Biology ==
There is a small area of coastal grassland in Western King SSSI, where the plant called field eryngo occurs.

== Land ownership ==
All land in Western King SSSI is owned by the local authority.
