= Haldon Forest =

Forest in Devon, England

Coordinates: 50.65243°N 3.58532°W

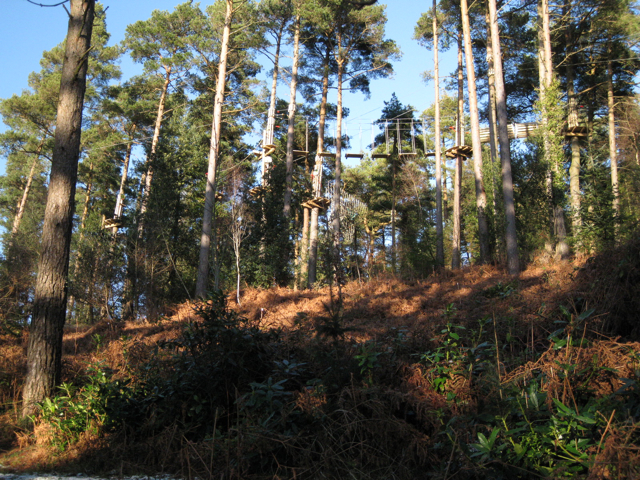
- Treetop obstacle course in Haldon Forest
- Interactive map of Haldon Forest

Geography
- Location: Devon, South West England, United Kingdom
- Elevation: 250 metres (820 ft)
- Area: 1,500 hectares (3,700 acres)

Administration
- Visitation: 500,000
- Managedr: Forestry England

Ecology
- Dominant tree species: Conifers
- Fauna: Eurasian goshawk; Honey buzzard; Common kestrel; European nightjar; Fallow deer; Roe deer; Pearl-bordered fritillary

Haldon Forest is a forest located in the Haldon Hills, Devon, England. The forest consists of several different woods. Geographically, Haldon Forest is located between the towns of Chudleigh and Exminster and is south of Exeter.

== Management ==
It is managed by the Forestry Commission, who also manage other forests throughout the country. Part of the Haldon Forest site that is owned by the Forestry Commission is a Site of Special Scientific Interest. In 1992, it became the first man-made coniferous forest to be designated as a Site of Special Scientific Interest. One of the reasons for designating the forest as a Site of Special Scientific Interest is the presence of a population of nightjars. The forest was planted and developed after World War I to supply England's timber trade. It still maintains this mixed-use status, with parts of the surrounding Haldon Hills being used for agriculture, mining, and coppicing, and others for public recreation.

== Biology ==
Haldon Forest is designated as a protected area because of its exceptional assemblage of bird and insect species. In addition to nightjar, bird species recorded in this protected area include honey buzzard, goshawk, hobby, sparrowhawk, buzzard, kestrel, crossbill and siskin. Butterfly species recorded in this protected area include high brown fritillary, marsh fritillary, pearl-bordered fritillary and wood white. Moth species include dotted carpet, pale pinion and beautiful brocade.

Remnants of heathland habitat remain in this protected area.

== Activities ==
The Forestry Commission promotes many activities at the park, such as cycling, horse riding, walking, orienteering, and others. There is a selection of walking and cycling trails to suit all abilities.

The park also holds regular events.

Also based at Haldon Forest Park are:Go Ape, The Ridge Cafe, Forest Cycle Hire, Segway Southwest Ltd.
