= Bolshayne Fen =

Coordinates: 50.73858°N 3.10390°W

Bolshayne Fen (grid reference SY222938) is a wetland in southeast Devon, England. It has an area of 1.62 hectares.

The site was designated as a Site of Special Scientific Interest on 25 September 1992.

== Site Description ==
This site contains an unusually large and intact valley fen, supporting rich marsh vegetation of a type known only at two other sites in Devon and which is now nationally scarce. The fen occupies a single field at an altitude of 40 m, through which runs a small stream called Nanny's Water, which is a tributary of the River Coly. Its soils consist of deep waterlogged peaty loam above Triassic mudstones, with Cretaceous Greensand on the valley sides above. During winter it periodically floods.

== Vegetation ==
The vegetation is mainly of a mosaic of yellow iris Iris pseudacorus, branched bur-reed Sparganium erectum and rushes Juncus spp., while greater tussock-sedge Carex paniculata is locally dominant. Other conspicuous plants include meadowsweet Filipendula ulmaria, marsh-marigold Caltha palustris, ragged robin Lychnis flos-cuculi, watermint Mentha aquatica and southern marsh-orchid Dactylorhiza praetermissa. Also present are four species which are local in Devon: wood club-rush Scirpus sylvaticus, marsh valerian Valeriana dioica, fen bedstraw Galium uliginosum and common spike-rush Eleocharis palustris. The stream is bordered for most of its length by alder Alnus glutinosa, with a ground flora dominated by ramsons Allium ursinum.

== Other biodiversity interest ==
Brown trout Salmo trutta fario and eel Anguilla anguilla are known to occur in Nanny's Water. The site supports a varied reptile fauna, including grass snake Natrix natrix and adder Vipera berus. It also supports a number of bird species including water rail, which rarely breeds in Devon but has been recorded during the summer at this site. During the winter snipe and woodcock commonly feed within the fen, and grey heron and barn owl occur.
