= Meadfoot Sea Road =

Geological Site of Special Scientific Interest in Devon, England

Coordinates: 50.45981°N 3.50315°W

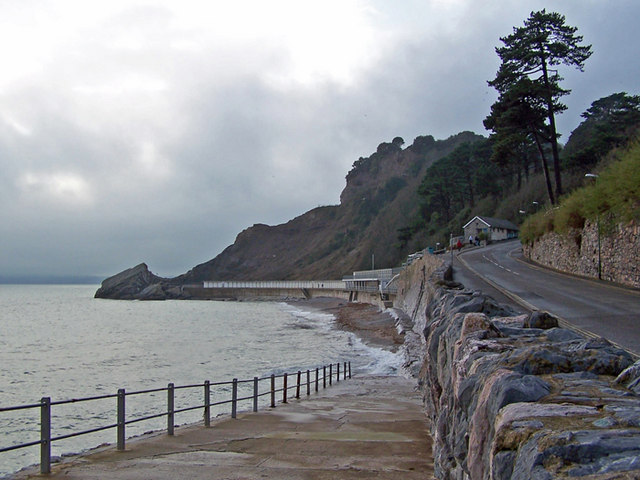

Meadfoot Sea Road (grid reference SX934633) is a 6.1 hectare geological Site of Special Scientific Interest in Devon, England, notified in 1987 for its Devonian geology.

== Land ownership ==
All land within Meadfoot Sea Road SSSI is owned by the local authority.

== Sources ==
- English Nature citation sheet for the site (accessed 6 August 2006)
