= Deptford Farm Pastures =

UK protected area

- Site of Special Scientific Interest
- Location within Devon
- Location of Deptford Farm Pastures.
- Area of search: Devon
- Grid reference: SS 275 187
- Coordinates: 50.9425°N 4.4575°W
- Area: 54.8 acres (0.2218 km^{2}; 0.08563 sq mi)
- Notification date: 1991

Deptford Farm Pastures is a Site of Special Scientific Interest (SSSI) in Devon, England. It is located 6km north of Kilkhampton, near Meddon Plantation. It was designated in 1991 as a protected area because of the traditionally managed heath, mire and fen at the site that form a community known as Culm Grassland.

It is dominated by the plant species, Succisa pratensis, and also contains the rare plant Genista anglica. This protected area contains a large colony of the rare butterfly: the Marsh Fritillary.

== Land ownership ==
Parts of the land in Deptford Farm Pastures SSSI is owned by the Forestry Commission.
