= East Devon National Landscape =

Area of Outstanding Natural Beauty in Devon, England

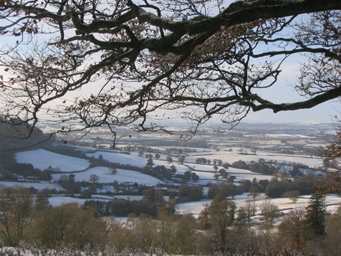
- East Devon Countryside in winter

- Location of the East Devon AONB in the UK
- Location: Devon, England
- Coordinates: 50.314°N 3.825°W
- Established: 1963

East Devon National Landscape covers over 100 square miles (260 km^{2}) of the East Devon countryside (England).

This countryside includes eighteen miles (29 km) of Heritage coastline. The designated area covers: twenty-nine parishes and borders the coastal towns of Exmouth, Seaton and Sidmouth but includes the entire resort of Budleigh Salterton.

East Devon has two AONBs within its catchment area which includes the Blackdown Hills (designated 1991) and East Devon AONB (designated 1963), both AONBs make up around 70% of the district.

East Devon AONB Partnership is a joint initiative funded by Defra (Department for Environment, Food and Rural Affairs), East Devon District Council and Devon County Council. Through ventures such as community projects and project grants East Devon AONB Partnership helps to conserve and manage the East Devon AONB.
