= Swanpool, Devon =

Coastal nature reserve in Devon, England

Coordinates: 51.1093°N 4.1842°W

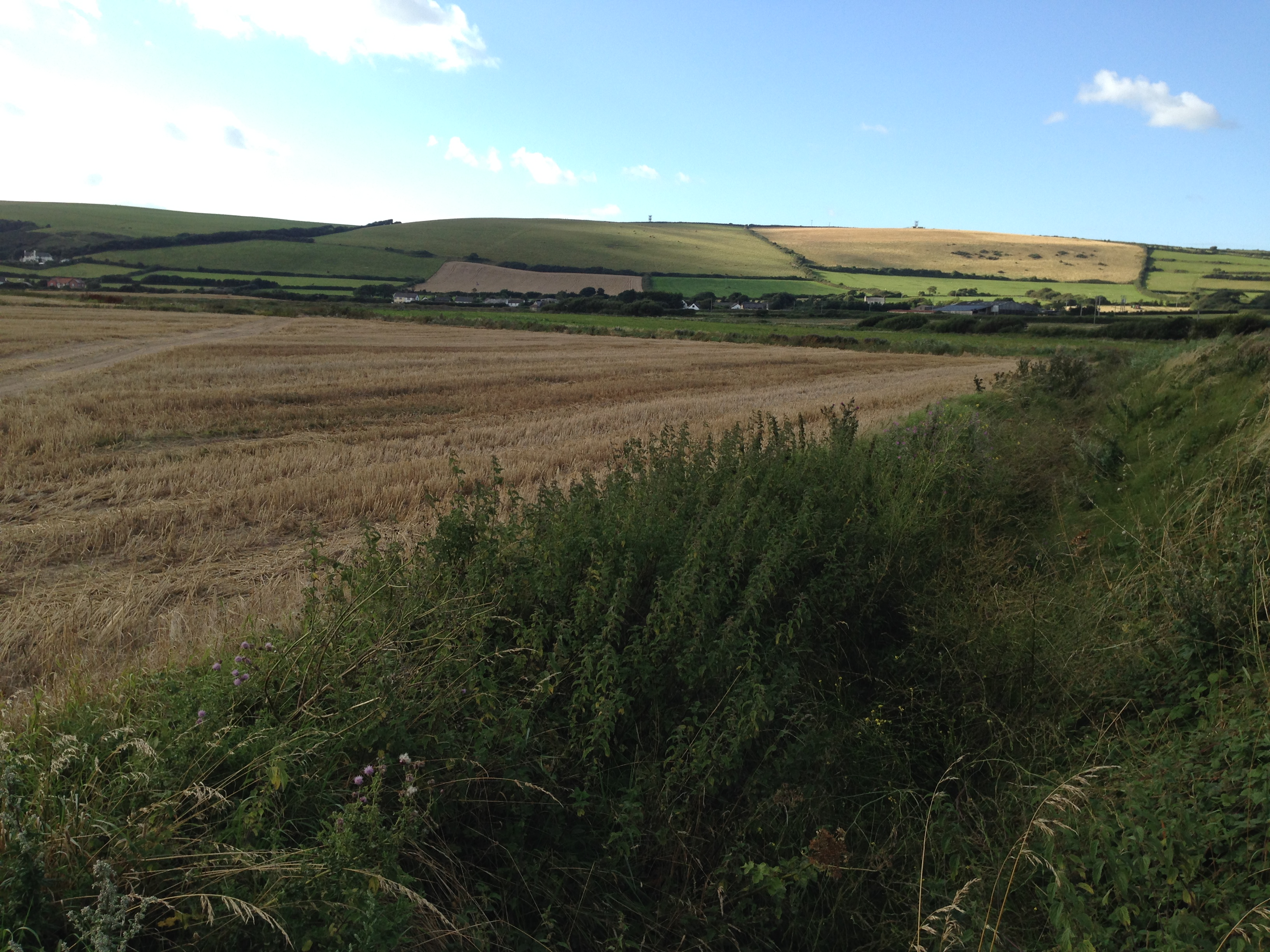
Swanpool SSSI near Braunton

Swanpool, near Braunton, Devon, England, is a Site of Special Scientific Interest (SSSI) managed by the Devon Wildlife Trust as a nature reserve. It is a small area of coastal grassland and marsh.

Swanpool Marsh nature reserve forms part of the Braunton-Swanpool coastal marshland SSSI. Devon Wildlife Trust purchased it in 1988. Because it is close to sea level and poorly drained, the water table is at or near the surface for much of the year.
