= Graphina ruiziana =

Scientific classification
- Domain: Eukaryota
- Kingdom: Fungi
- Division: Ascomycota
- Class: Lecanoromycetes
- Order: Graphidales
- Family: Graphidaceae
- Genus: Graphina
- Species: G. ruiziana

Binomial name
- Graphina ruiziana (Fée) Müll.Arg.

Species of fungus

Graphina ruiziana is a species of fungus belonging to the family Graphidaceae.

It has almost cosmopolitan distribution.
