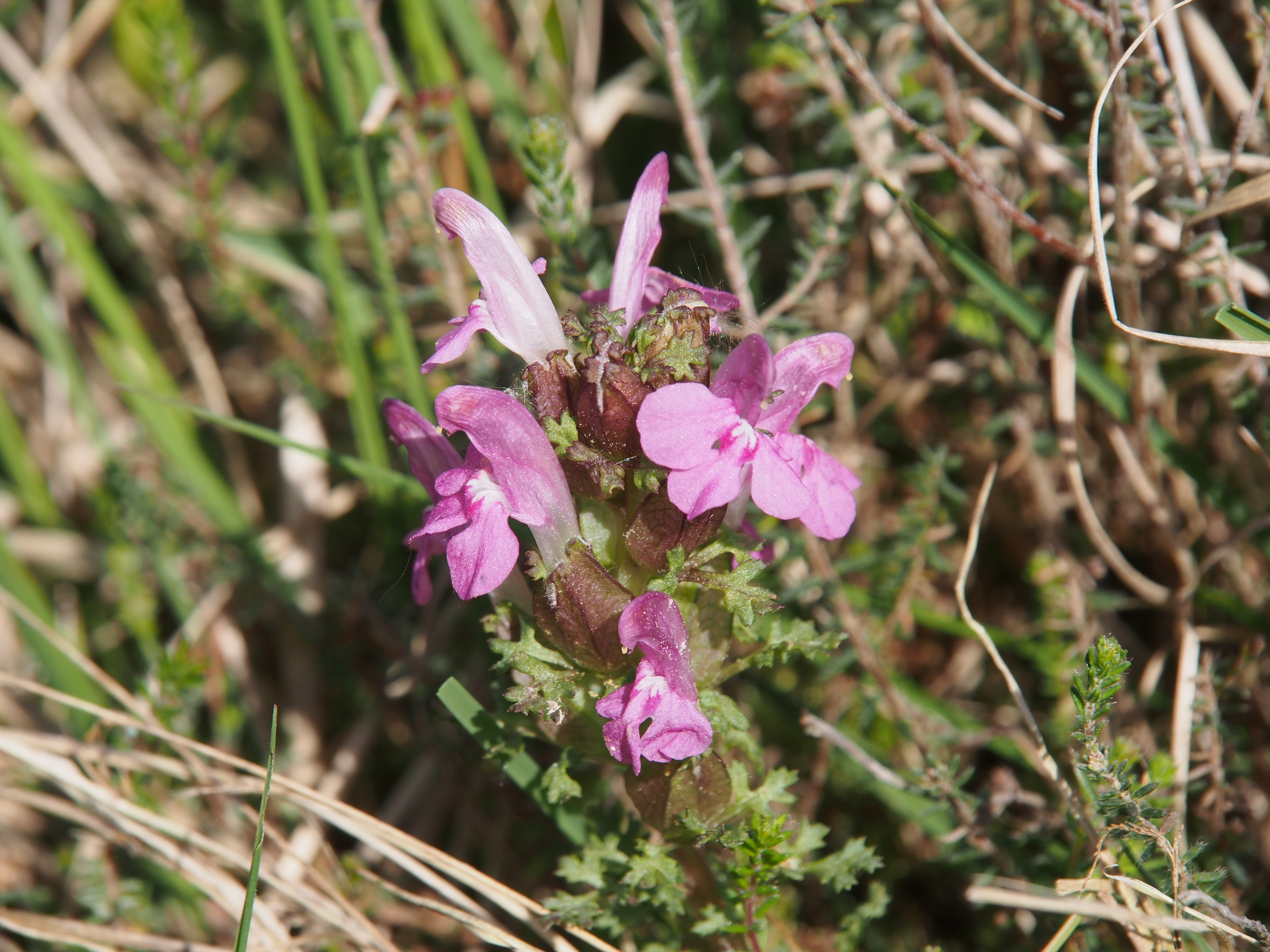

Scientific classification
- Kingdom: Plantae
- Clade: Tracheophytes
- Clade: Angiosperms
- Clade: Eudicots
- Clade: Asterids
- Order: Lamiales
- Family: Orobanchaceae
- Genus: Pedicularis
- Species: P. sylvatica

Binomial name
- Pedicularis sylvatica L.

= Pedicularis sylvatica =

Common lousewort

Species of flowering plant

Pedicularis sylvatica, commonly known as common lousewort, is a plant species in the genus Pedicularis. It is native to central and northern Europe where it grows on moist acidic soils, moorland, grassy heathland and the drier parts of marshes.

== Description ==
This is a compact biennial herb with a semi-erect stem up to 15 cm (6 in) tall. The leaves are opposite, with short stalks, rather thick and often tinged pink or purple. The leaf blades are small, triangular-lanceolate to linear, with pinnate lobes and toothed margins. The inflorescence is a raceme with usually four to six flowers open at a time. Each bilaterally symmetrical flower has a large, rounded, five-angled pinkish calyx, the four lobes being tipped with teeth, which can easily be observed before the flower has opened. The flower is pinkish-purple with white markings in the throat, and up to 2.5 cm (1 in) in length. The five petals are fused into a tube, the upper lip is curved into a hood, having two teeth at the tip. The lower lip is divided into three lobes. This species can be distinguished from marsh lousewort (Pedicularis palustris) by being smaller and less erect and having two small teeth at the tip of the upper lip rather than four.

== Distribution and habitat ==
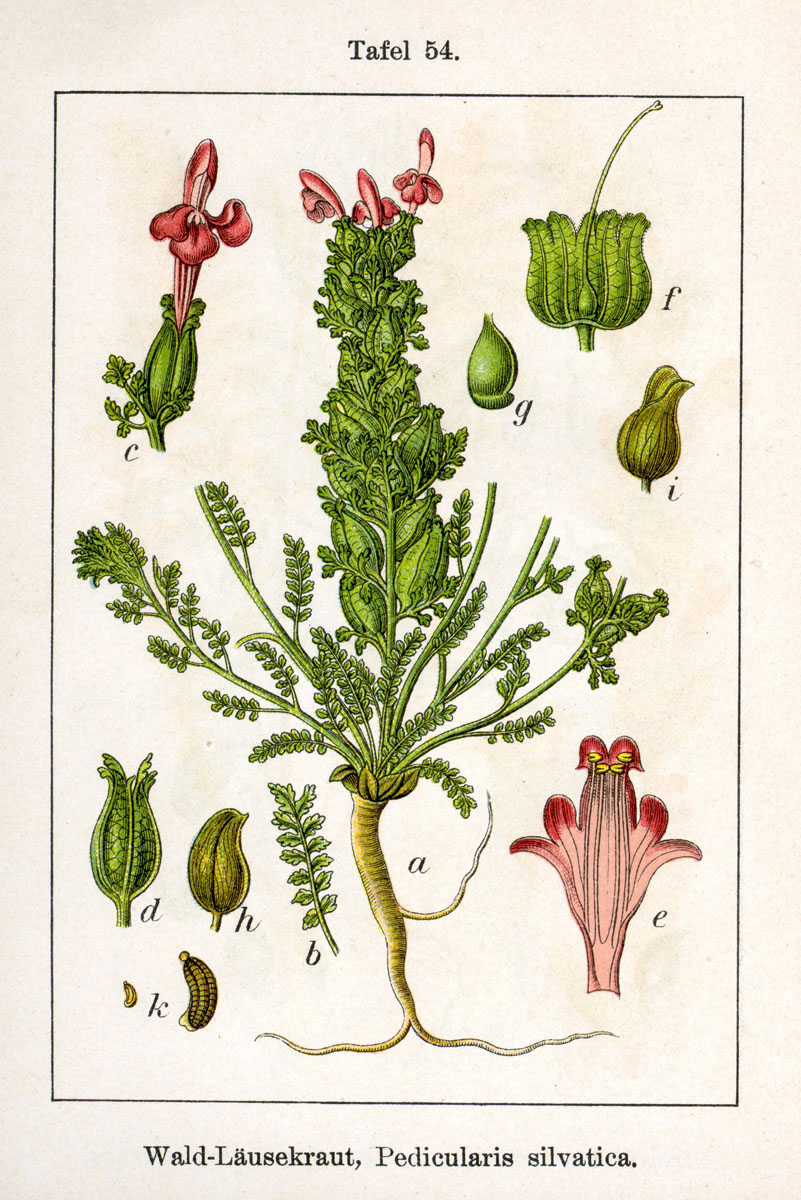
Illustration from book Deutschlands Flora in Abbildungen

Common lousewort is found in most of Europe, apart from the southeast. In the British Isles it occurs on damp acidic soils in Scotland, Ireland, Wales, northern and southwestern England, and in scattered locations elsewhere in England, at altitudes up to about 915 m (3,000 ft). Typical habitats include moorland, wet flushes in mountainous areas, grassy heathland, lakesides and the drier parts of marshes and bogs.

== Ecology ==
The origin of the common name is that there was a belief in times past that livestock that ate this plant would acquire lice as a consequence. Like other members of the genus, common lousewort is semi-parasitic, supplementing its own resources by connecting its roots to those of nearby plants and extracting water and nutrients for its own use.
