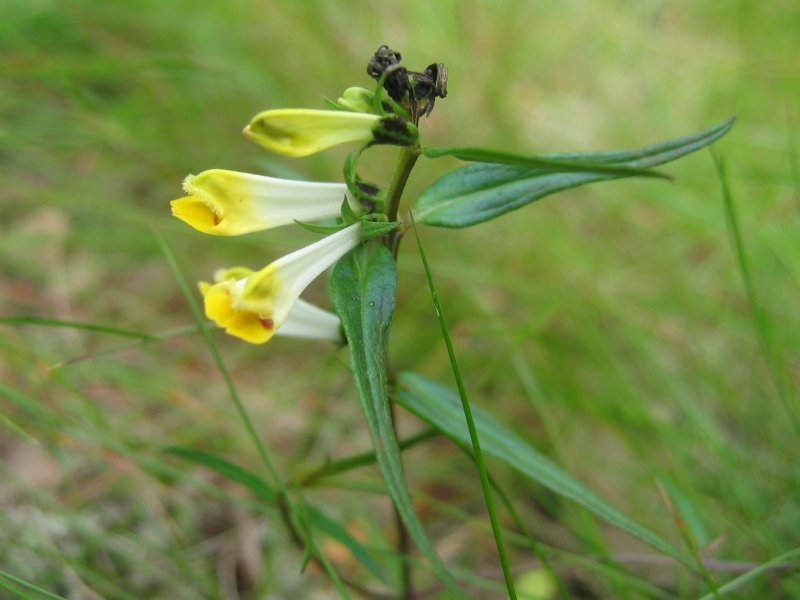

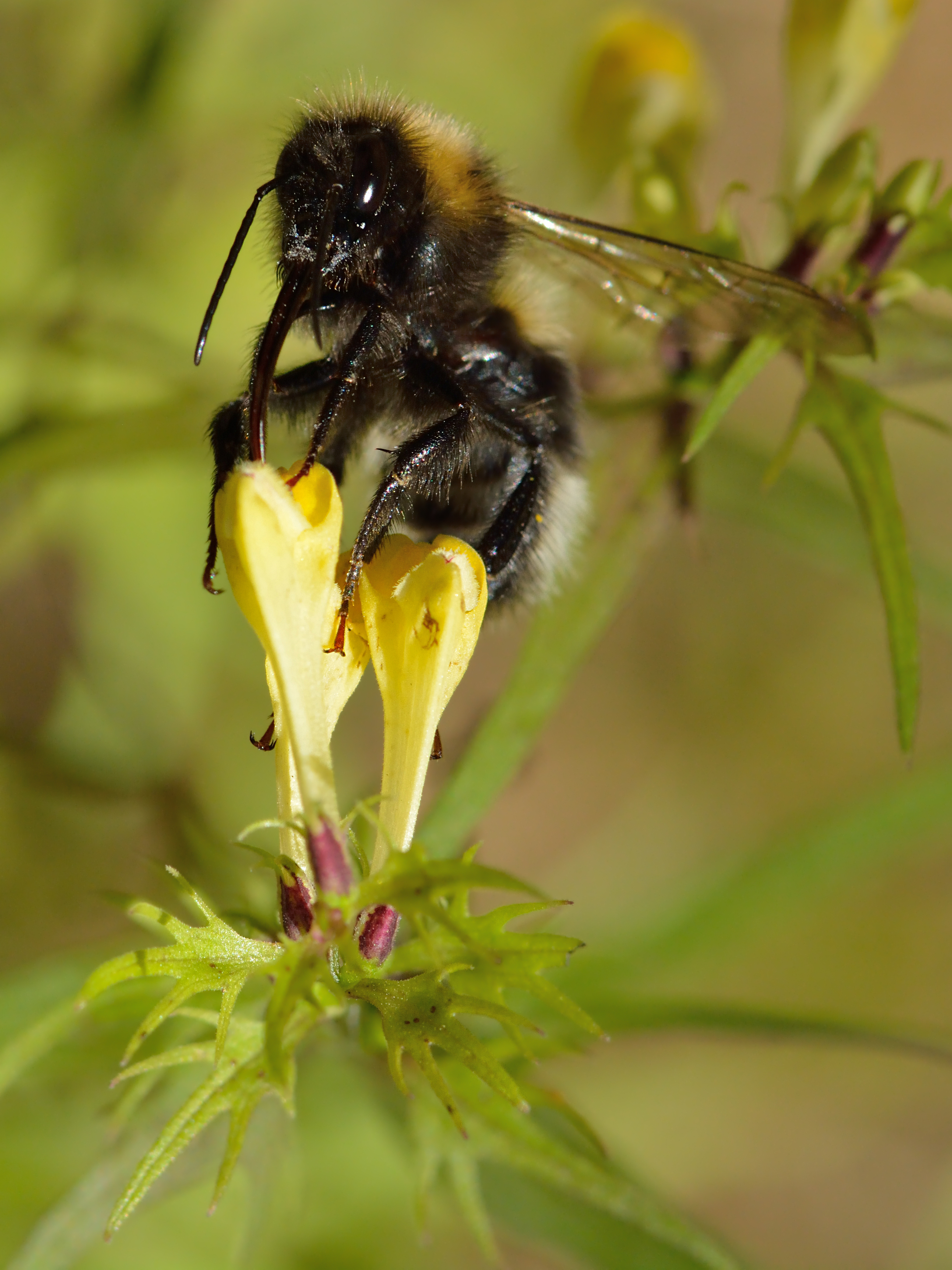

Scientific classification
- Kingdom: Plantae
- Clade: Tracheophytes
- Clade: Angiosperms
- Clade: Eudicots
- Clade: Asterids
- Order: Lamiales
- Family: Orobanchaceae
- Genus: Melampyrum
- Species: M. pratense

Binomial name
- Melampyrum pratense L.

= Melampyrum pratense =

Species of flowering plant

Melampyrum pratense, the common cow-wheat, is a plant species in the family Orobanchaceae.

The seed of the plant has an elaiosome, which is attractive to wood ants (Formica spp.). The ants disperse the seeds of the plant when they take them back to their nests to feed their young. The plant is an ancient woodland indicator, as the ants rarely carry the seeds more than a few yards, seldom crossing a field to go to a new woodland.

The Latin specific epithet pratense means "of meadows".

Melampyrum pratense is a food plant of the caterpillars of the heath fritillary (Melitaea athalia), a butterfly.

Melampyrum pratense herb has been used in traditional Austrian medicine internally as tea or externally as pillow filling for treatment of rheumatism and blood vessels calcification.

Melampyrum pratense can be parasitized by the oomycete species Peronospora tranzschelinana.

== See also ==
- Myrmecochory
