= List of nature centres in the United Kingdom =

This is a list of nature centres in the United Kingdom.

== England ==
Name	Location	County	Summary
Ainsdale Discovery Centre	Ainsdale	Merseyside	information, headquarters for the Sefton Coast and Countryside Service, education and programs about the 988-hectares Ainsdale and Birkdale Sandhills Local Nature Reserve
Attenborough Nature Centre	Attenborough	Nottinghamshire	Operated by the Nottinghamshire Wildlife Trust, includes visitor centre, 145 hectares of lakes, wetland, grassland and scrub
Avenue Learning Centre	Wingerworth	Derbyshire	website, operated by the Derbyshire Wildlife Trust, open for school visits in the Avenue Washlands reserve
Bishops Wood Centre	Stourport-on-Severn	Worcestershire	website, focuses on learning for sustainability, outdoor environmental learning, 39 hectares, operated by the Field Studies Council
Birmingham Nature Centre	Birmingham	West Midlands	Zoo with a range of animals from Europe and around the world
Brandon Marsh Nature Centre	Coventry	West Midlands	Headquarters of the Warwickshire Wildlife Trust, 92 hectare (228 acre) reserve with visitor centre with displays, hands-on activities and reserve information
British Wildlife Centre	Newchapel, Surrey	Surrey	Outdoor displays of native wildlife
Brocks Hill Country Park and Environment Centre	Oadby	Leicestershire	website, 30 hectares (67 acres), visitor centre features sustainable living technology
Canterbury Environmental Education Centre	Canterbury	Kent	website, 12 hectares, run in partnership with Kent County Council and National Grid
Centre of the Earth	Birmingham	West Midlands	Environmental education center operated by the Wildlife Trust for Birmingham and the Black Country
Conkers	Moira	Leicestershire	website, located in the National Forest, 120 acres, indoor and outdoor exhibits and discovery areas
Cricklepit Mill	Exeter	Devon	website, working water mill, headquarters for the Devon Wildlife Trust
Earth Trust Centre	Little Wittenham	South Oxfordshire	Operated by Earth Trust, visitor and education centre, near the Wittenham Clumps
Holland Park Ecology Centre	Kensington and Chelsea	London	22-hectare park (54 acres), programs include nature walks, talks, programs for schools and outdoor activity programs for children
How Hill	Ludham	Norfolk	Seasonal gardens, residential environmental education courses for school children, adult and family programs
Iver Nature Study Centre	Iver	Buckinghamshire	website, 2.5 acres, run in partnership with Groundwork Thames Valley and the National Grid
Langdon Visitor Centre	Basildon	Essex	461-acre Langdon reserve, operated by Essex Wildlife Trust, includes the Havens Plotlands Museum
Natural ScienceCentre	Newchapel	Staffordshire	website, includes a planetarium, observatory, alternative energy displays and a reclaimed wasteheap conservation area
Natural World Centre	Thorpe on the Hill	Lincolnshire	Visitor and nature education centre for Whisby Nature Park
The Nature Discovery Centre	Thatcham	Berkshire	Located on a quarry lake, features interactive wildlife and natural history displays, near to Thatcham Reed Beds, operated by the Royal Society for the Protection of Birds
Parkridge Centre	Solihull	West Midlands	Operated by the Warwickshire Wildlife Trust in Brueton Park, 5.5 acre reserve in 130-acre park
Pensthorpe	Fakenham	Norfolk	Reserve covers 600 acres (240 ha), includes visitor centre, gardens, lakes
Radipole Lake	Weymouth	Dorset	Wild Weymouth Discovery Centre features exhibits and programs about the lake and birds, trails and viewing blinds, operated by the Royal Society for the Protection of Birds
Ribble Discovery Centre	Lytham St Annes	Lancashire	website, education about Fairhaven Lake and the Ribble and Alt Estuaries, operated by the Royal Society for the Protection of Birds
The Pines Garden	St. Margaret's Bay	Kent	website, environmental education charity with gardens, operated by the Bay Trust
Rutland Water Nature Reserve	Egleton	Rutland	Includes the Anglian Water Birdwatching Centre and the Lyndon Visitor Centre
Skelton Grange Environment Centre	Leeds	West Yorkshire	website, 10 acres, partnership between The Conservation Volunteers and National Grid
Tilgate Nature Centre	Crawley	West Sussex	Features over 100 different species of animals including endangered and farmyard animals
Wembury Marine Centre	Wembury	Devon	Operated seasonally by Devon Wildlife Trust, features interactive displays, aquaria and rockpool rambles
West Boldon Lodge	West Boldon	Tyne and Wear	website, 13 acres, programs for schools and the community
Wildlife Discovery Room at Carsington Water	Ashbourne	Derbyshire	Operated as a partnership of Derbyshire Wildlife Trust and Severn Trent Water
WWT Arundel Wetland Centre	Arundel	West Sussex	60-acre (240,000 m²) wetland reserve with visitor centre, trails, hides, boat safari
WWT London Wetland Centre	Barnes	London	Over 100 acres (40 hectares), wetland reserve with visitor centre, trails, hides, ducks and birds from around the world
WWT Martin Mere Wetland Centre	Ormskirk	West Lancashire	Over 363 acres (147 ha), wetland reserve with visitor centre, trails, hides, canoeing, otters, natural play space
WWT Slimbridge Wetland Centre	Slimbridge	Gloucestershire	120 acres (49 ha), wetland reserve with visitor centre, trails, hides, canoeing, toad and amphibian display, flamingo lagoon
WWT Washington Wetland Centre	Washington	Tyne and Wear	Features rare and exotic birds, otters, wetland-themed adventure play area
WTT Welney Wetland Centre	Welney	Norfolk	Wetland reserve with visitor centre, trails, hides, Fenland Worlds Discovery Centre

== Northern Ireland ==
- ECOS Millennium Environmental Centre, Ballymena, County Antrim
- WWT Castle Espie, Comber, County Down

== Scotland ==
- Aigas Field Centre, Beauly, Inverness-shire
- Falls of Clyde Visitor Centre and Wildlife Reserve, Lanark, Scotland
- Loch of the Lowes Visitor Centre and Wildlife Reserve, Dunkeld, Perth and Kinross
- Montrose Basin Visitor Centre and Wildlife Reserve, Montrose, Lanarkshire
- Scottish Seabird Centre, North Berwick, East Lothian
- University of Aberdeen Natural History Centre, Aberdeen
- Water of Leith Visitor Centre, Edinburgh
- WDCS Wildlife Centre, Spey Bay, Moray
- WDCS Dolphin And Seal Centre, North Kessock
- WWT Caerlaverock, Dumfries and Galloway

== Wales ==
- Pensychnant Conservation Centre & Nature Reserve, Conwy, Clwyd
- WWT National Wetlands Centre Llanelli, Llanelli, Carmarthenshire
