= Voluntary Marine Conservation Area =

UK designation for protected coastline

Voluntary Marine Conservation Area (VMCA) is a designation in the United Kingdom for areas of coastline which are of particular wildlife and scientific value that enjoy a level of voluntary protection.

VMCAs are run by a range of organisations and steering groups and are often supported by community or volunteer groups. VMCAs often aim to promote the Seashore Code as a means for the public to treat the coastline with care.

== List of VMCAs ==
The first VMCA to be set up was in Lundy, 1973. Helford was designated in 1987. North Devon was established in 1994, spans the coast from Combe Martin to Croyde and is managed by Devon Wildlife Trust; Purbeck; and Wembury (Wembury Marine Centre).
