= Chudleigh Knighton Heath =

Protected area in Devon, England

Coordinates: 50.5849°N 3.6421°W

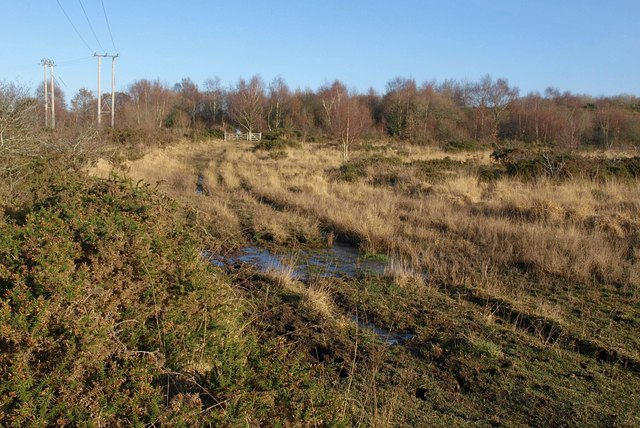
Chudleigh Knighton Heath

Chudleigh Knighton Heath, near Chudleigh Knighton, Devon, is a Site of Special Scientific Interest, so designated because of its rare lowland heath vegetation. It is a habitat for many rare species including the ant, Formica exsecta. This is one of only two wild colonies in England, the other being at Bovey Heath.

The site is leased by the Devon Wildlife Trust from Sibelco formerly WBB Minerals. The Trust have created several ponds noted for 12 breeding species of dragonfly including the scarce Keeled Skimmer.

The Heath was once the village's main football pitch and was the venue for many sports days for Chudleigh Knighton Church of England Primary School. However the pitch fell into disrepair and was unsuitable for sporting activities, so the School opened its own private sports field opposite to the village play park. The football pitch is now used by local dog walkers, the football posts are still standing today, though they are a little rusty.
