= Horsey Island, Devon =

Nature reserve in Devon, England

Coordinates: 51°04′57″N 4°10′31″W

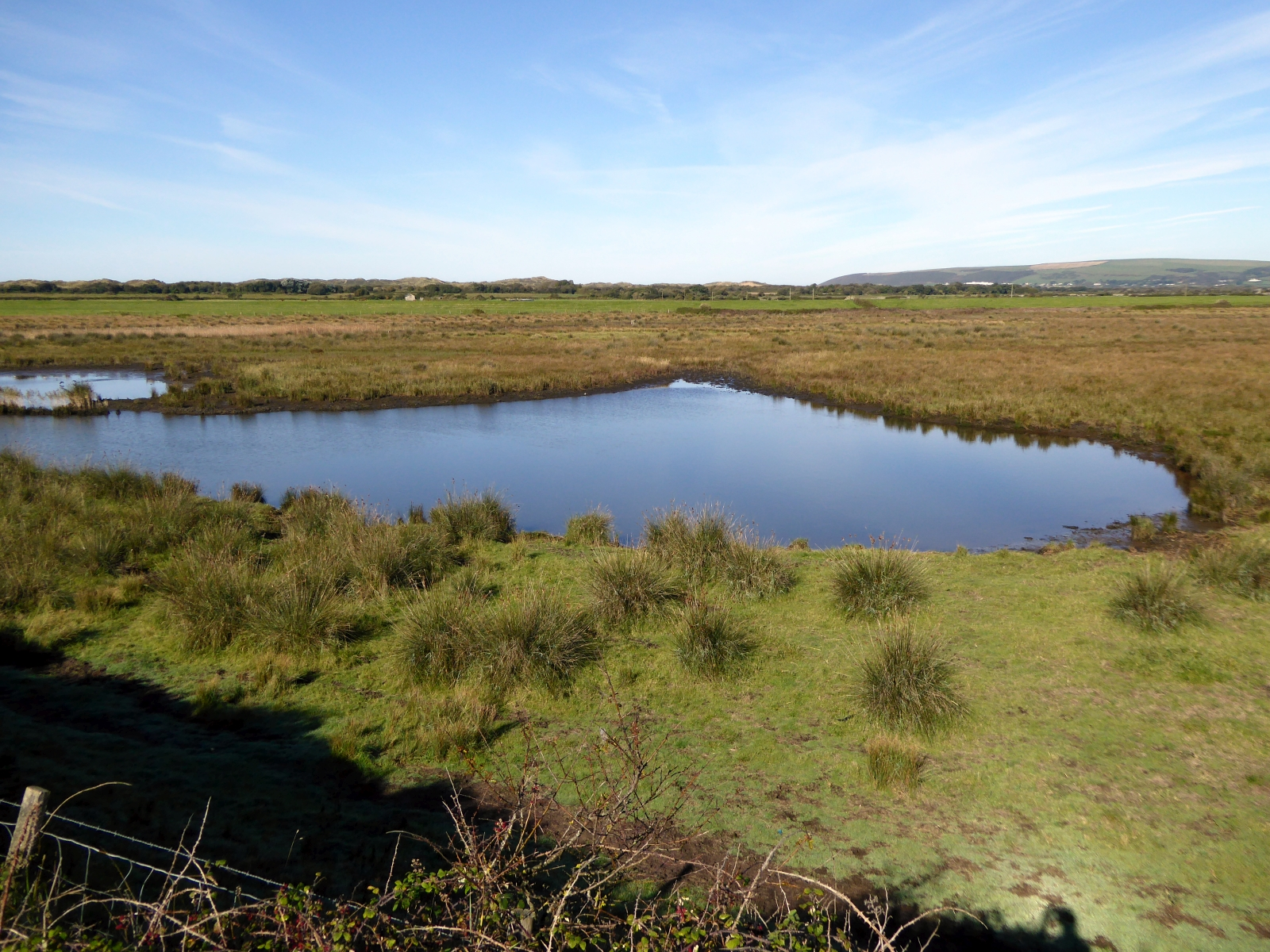

Horsey Island is a nature reserve adjoining the Taw estuary in northwest Devon, England. It is owned and managed by the Devon Wildlife Trust, the trust having purchased the 80 hectare site in November 2019.

The land was reclaimed from the sea in 1857 and used for pasture and arable crops. The sea wall was breached in multiple places by a storm in 1910 but repaired the following year. Another breach occurred in 2017 and this was enlarged in 2018 and was not subsequently repaired. The interior of the 'island' is now inundated at each tide with the result that former grassland is now reverting to mudflats, sandbanks and saltmarsh with sea purslane and samphire becoming established. It is now one of Devon's most significant birdwatching sites. The South West Coast Path which formerly ran along the outer embankment of Horsey Island was diverted onto a more inland route, the Great Bank, subsequent to the breaching of the sea wall.

The site lies within the North Devon Biosphere Reserve.
