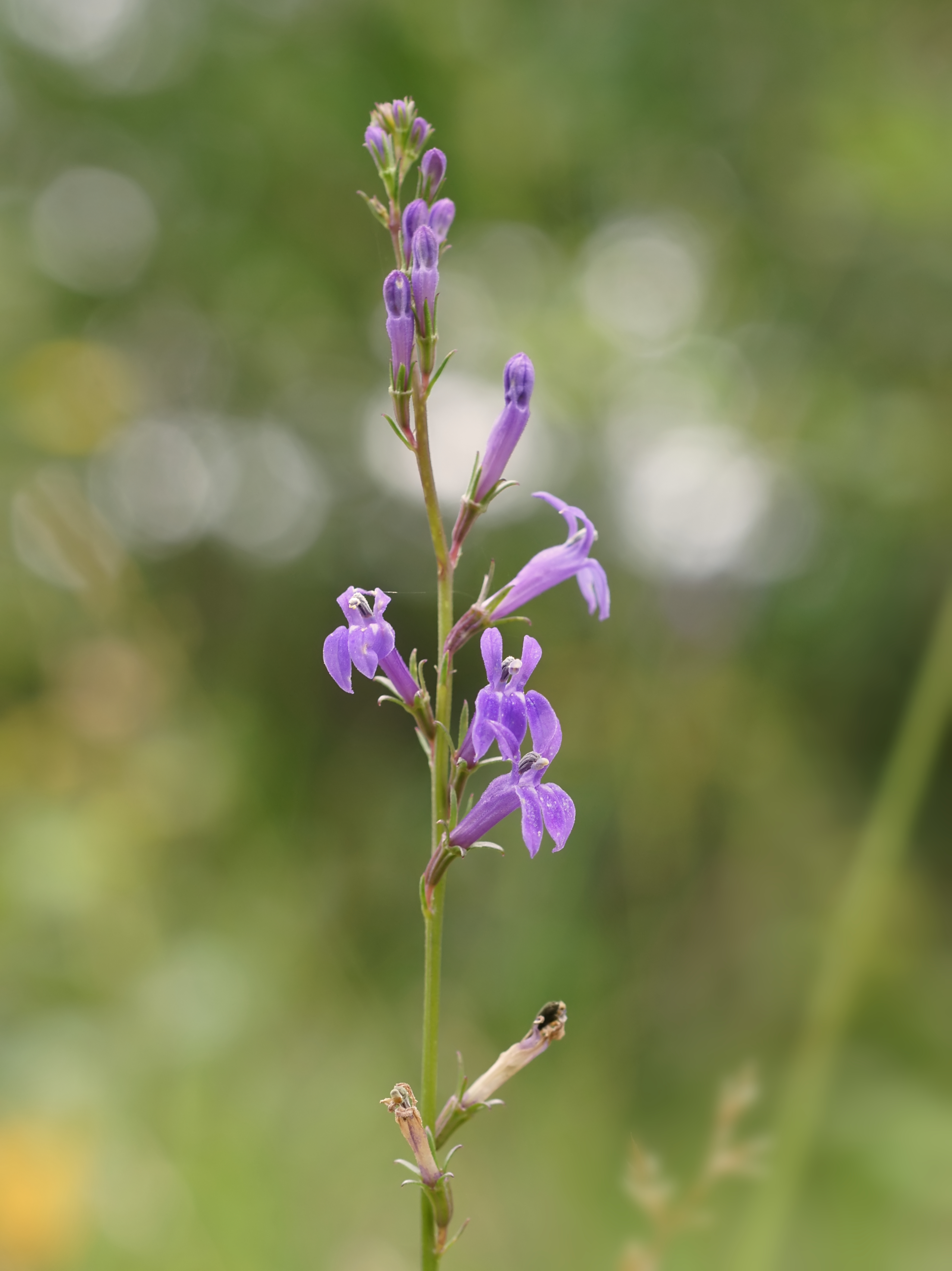

Scientific classification
- Kingdom: Plantae
- Clade: Tracheophytes
- Clade: Angiosperms
- Clade: Eudicots
- Clade: Asterids
- Order: Asterales
- Family: Campanulaceae
- Genus: Lobelia
- Species: L. urens

Binomial name
- Lobelia urens L.

= Lobelia urens =

Species of flowering plant

Lobelia urens, commonly known as heath lobelia or acrid lobelia is a species of flowering plant in the bellflower family. It is predominantly native to western Europe but can also be found in northern Morocco and in the island of Madeira off Northwest Africa.

It can be found in communities on grassy heaths, rough pastures, and open heathy woodlands, often found on woodland margins on infertile acid soils. Within this they are found in low-lying terrain, often valley bottoms. The soils are seasonally waterlogged.

== Description ==
Lobelia urens is more or less hairless perennial and can grow up to 60 cm tall. It has rhizomes. The leaves are obovate at the base, and linear to oblong higher up. They are shiny dark green and toothed. They have very short stalks. The calyx teeth are long and very narrow.

The flowers are up to 1.5 cm long, blue-purple. They have 2 narrow lobes on upper lip, and 3 narrow teeth on the lower. The stalks are less than 1 cm, and corolla lobes are less than 2mm wide. It flowers from May until September. The flowers are hermaphrodite and zygomorphic.

The plant requires bare ground patches in which the seeds can germinate. Germination is improved in soil with a high moisture content. Seeds are produced throughout the year, peaking in production during July and August. Only those that are produced March to June survive.

=== Differences from garden lobelia ===
Garden lobelia (Lobelia erinus) is similar, but is slender, trailing, an annual, comes in different colours, the flower stalks are up to 2 cm, and the lower 3 corolla lobes are more than 2mm wide.

== Distribution ==
From north to south, this plant is found throughout southern England (rare, and in lowland areas up to 210 metres high), Belgium, the western portion of France (in lowland coastal areas), the humid western portion of the Iberian Peninsula in Portugal (along the coastal plain, passing into the wet northern province valleys up to 800 metres) and western Spain (in grazed pasture of upland valleys between 600 and 915 metres high), the Rif Mountains of Morocco and the island of Madeira. Outside of its native range it was introduced to the Azores.

== Associated species ==
They are often found with Juncus articulatus, Juncus conglomeratus, Lotus pedunculatus, Mentha aquatica (water mint), Molinia caerulea (purple moor grass), Potentilla erecta, Pulicaria dysenterica, and Salix cinerea.

== Places found ==
- Andrews Wood, (near Modbury in Devon), a site managed by the Devon Wildlife Trust, and a Site of Special Scientific Interest - supports the largest colony of heath lobelia in Great Britain. In 2009, 9828 plants were recorded. Also found in Redlake Cottage Meadows in Cornwall.
