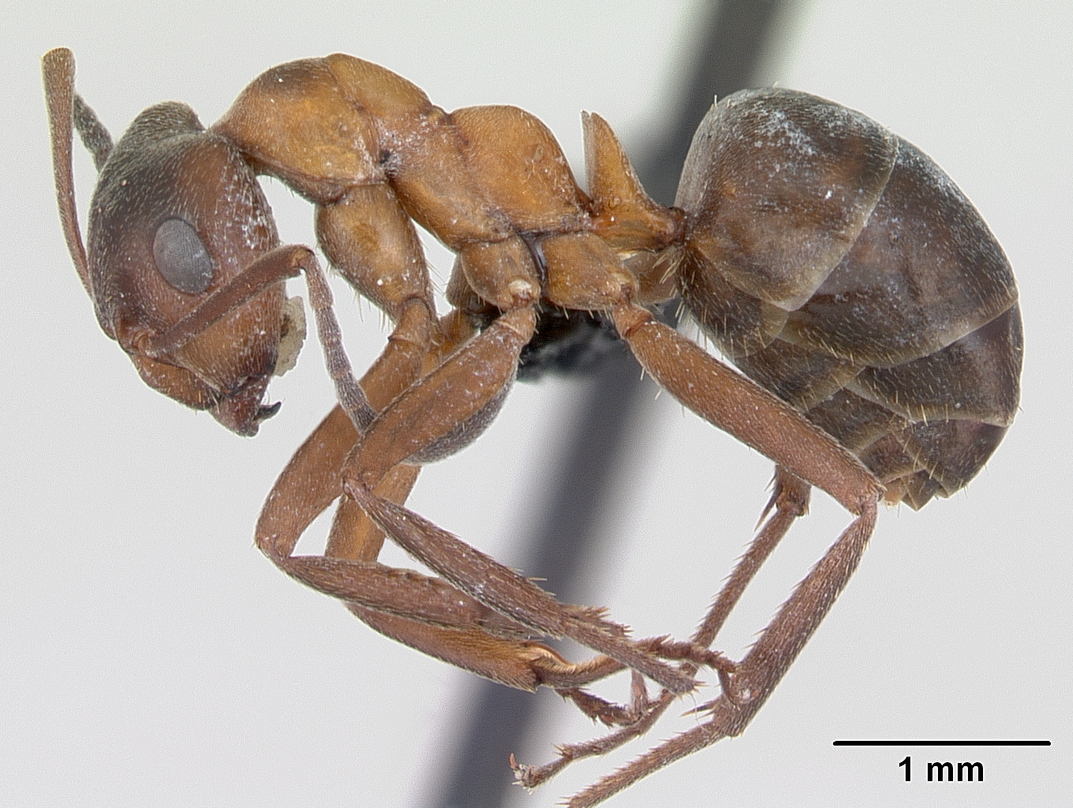

Scientific classification
- Kingdom: Animalia
- Phylum: Arthropoda
- Class: Insecta
- Order: Hymenoptera
- Family: Formicidae
- Subfamily: Formicinae
- Genus: Formica
- Species: F. exsecta

Binomial name
- Formica exsecta Nylander, 1846

= Formica exsecta =

Species of ant

Formica exsecta (the narrow-headed ant or excised wood ant) is a species of ant found from Western Europe to Asia.

A rare formicine ant with a deeply excised head, F. exsecta forms small mounds up to around a foot in height consisting of much finer material than that used by "true" wood ants of the F. rufa group.

An interesting feature of F. exsecta is that it occurs in two distinct social forms: either a monogyne form where the colony has a single egg-laying queen, or a polygyne form where many egg-laying queens are part of the same colony.

F. exsecta is placed in the Coptoformica subgenus within the genus and is closely related to Formica exsectoides, an American species. Both species may form vast colony networks. The largest known polydomous system of F. exsecta consists of 3,350 nests dispersed over about 22 ha in Transylvania, Romania.

In Great Britain, F. exsecta can be found only in a few scattered heathland locations in South West England — principally Chudleigh Knighton Heath and nearby Bovey Heath, which are both managed by the Devon Wildlife Trust, and in the central Scottish Highlands (including Rannoch Moor). A population centre previously existed in the New Forest, and such eminent myrmecologists as Horace Donisthorpe recorded this species there and in Parkhurst Forest on the Isle of Wight in the last century, but this seems to have declined considerably over the past few decades, and recent searches in such locations have failed to find any trace of colonies. The narrow-headed ant is currently one of the target species in the Back from the Brink project, which aims to extend its range in England.

F. exsecta has also been found in forests in Sweden, Finland, Germany, Tibet, and China.

== Behavior ==
=== Sex allocation ===
F. exsecta is a eusocial species, displaying a dominance hierarchy among its individual colony members. Amongst the narrow-headed ant species, the two different types of colony structure are: monogyny, one queen per colony, and polygyny, more than one queen per colony. Most commonly, one of these two different types is prevalent within a population. These two types of colonies differ not only in the queen's mating system, but also in the organization of types of offspring and its hierarchy system. For a polygynous colony to thrive, it must adjust its sex allocation practices contingent on the abundance of resources. Colonies produce a greater percentage of male offspring when restraint on resource availability exists, as well as when the colony has a larger number of queens. The opposite scenario is also found to be true. More female offspring are produced when an abundance of resources exists, as well as when the colony has a smaller number of queens. On average, a colony's sex ratio is estimated to be 5.8% female, or one female for every 17.2 male offspring. This heavily male offspring-based sex ratio displays an obvious deviation from Fisher's theory of 1:1 sex ratio.

In colonies in which the male offspring are favored, workers tend to execute most of the female gynes. In contrast, colonies where an excess of female gynes is produced, which is more than necessary for the simple act of queen replacement, they are all accepted into the colony to eliminate the possibility of parasitism by unrelated queens from neighboring populations.

=== Inbreeding ===
In monogynous colonies, a significant amount of inbreeding is found. Inbreeding coefficients were found positive for the workers of these colonies. No inbreeding was found between mother queens. Procreation between related individuals of the colony can be further explained by the queen-male relatedness coefficient of 0.23, found by experiments from Liselotte Sundström. Male offspring that were reared in an inbred colony tended to be smaller in mass. Gynes reared in inbred colony display no difference in mass compared to those in noninbred colonies. This result reflects a trade-off between the quantity of offspring and their reproductive potential. Gynes' reproductive success is more dependent on their mass than that of a male.

=== Fitness and homozygosity ===
In single-queen colonies, the level of queen homozygosity is negatively associated with colony age. Reduced colony survival appears to be due to reduced queen lifespan resulting from queen homozygosity.

Worker homozygosity appeared to affect reproductive allocation, with higher homozygosity being associated with less resources being allocated to the sexual brood and more to worker production.

=== Haplodiploidy ===
F. exsecta, much like other insects in the order Hymenoptera, have a haplodiploid sex determination system. An unusual 0.75 relatedness coefficient between full haplodiploid sisters is one of the main contributors to the frequency of evolution of eusocial species. The queen's eggs that are fertilized grow into diploid daughters, which contain two pairs of chromosomes, whereas unfertilized eggs produce haploid males, which only contain the queen's chromosomes. The voluntary fertilization of eggs is done by the egg-laying mother. Therefore, ideally, the queen's best reproductive interest is to lay a larger quantity of eggs or increase the number of eggs that produce individuals that can reproduce themselves. However, female-rich colonies emphasized the production of workers rather than gynes.
