= Fremington Local Nature Reserve =

Local nature reserve in North Devon, England

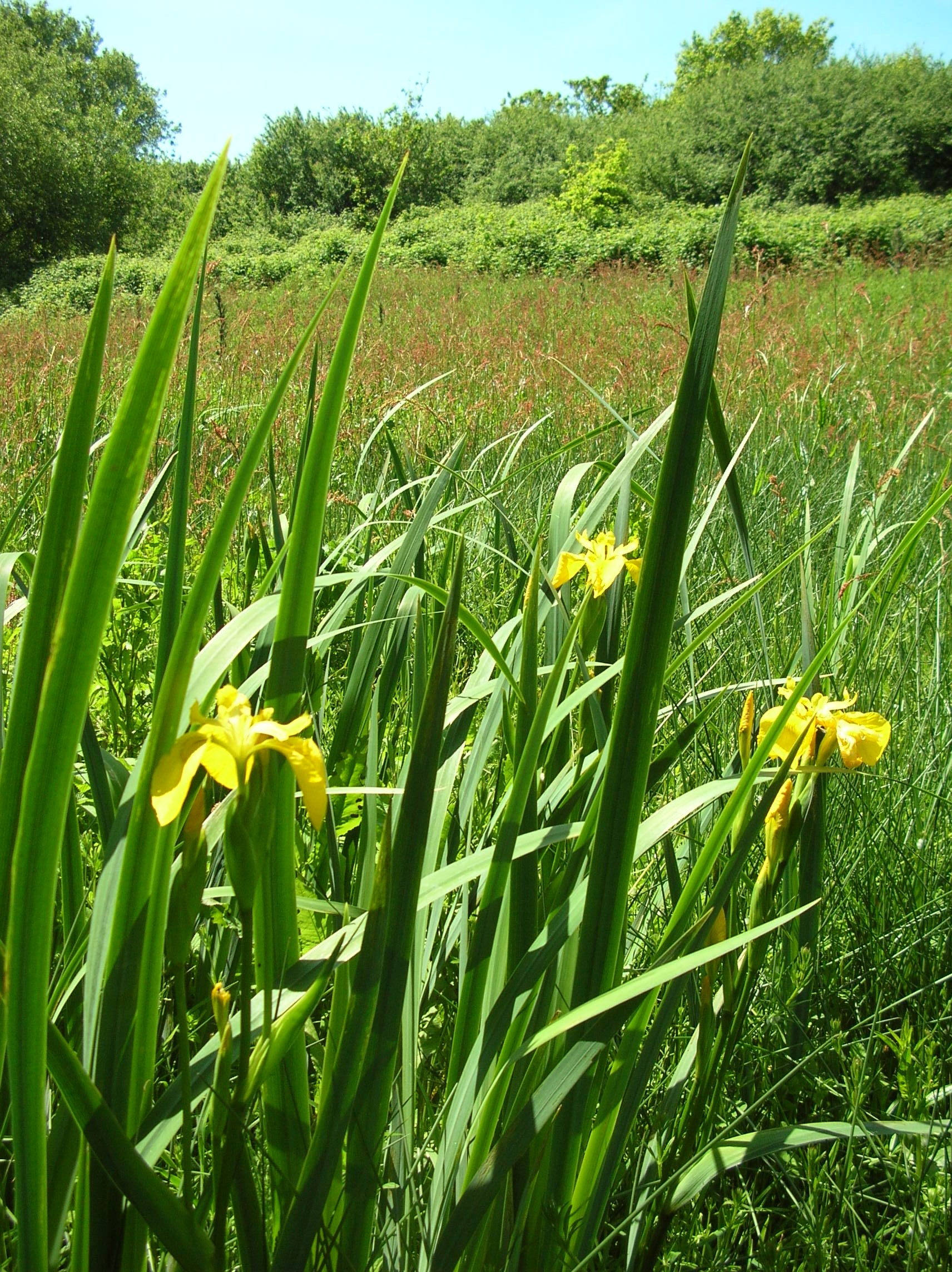
Iris pseudacorus at Fremington

Fremington Local Nature Reserve is a Local Nature Reserve situated between Bideford and Barnstaple in North Devon. The Local Nature Reserve was designated in 2006. The reserve comprises two separate areas: Lovell's Field and Leat Meadow. Both locations are County Wildlife Sites, and are within the North Devon Biosphere Reserve.

== Lovell's Field ==
51.0724°N 4.1228°W

Lovell's Field is 4.1 hectares (10 acres) of coastal and floodplain grazing marsh, owned by North Devon Council. Cattle grazing was re-introduced in 2009 to Lovell's Field to help prevent it becoming overgrown and rank. Trees have been cleared from the main part of the field in 2011 to prevent drying out and create attractive conditions for estuarine birds. A scrape was constructed at Lovell's Field in 2016 and a new pond dug at Leat Meadow in 2019. Both of these project were implemented to improve the variety of habitats on the reserve.

== Leat Meadow ==
51.0683°N 4.1268°W

Leat Meadow is 3 ha (7.4 acres) of neutral grassland, wet woodland and hazel coppice. The meadows are cut annually by local volunteers and dormouse boxes have been put up in the woodland.
