= Sundström =

Sundström is a Swedish surname, a compound of the Swedish words sund (sound; passage of water) ström (stream and/or stream in water)

== Geographical distribution ==
As of 2014, 79.2% of all known bearers of the surname Sundström were residents of Sweden (frequency 1:1,192) and 19.5% of Finland (1:2,697).

In Sweden, the frequency of the surname was higher than national average (1:1,192) in the following counties:

1. Norrbotten County (1:244)
2. Västernorrland County (1:356)
3. Västerbotten County (1:424)
4. Jämtland County (1:654)
5. Gävleborg County (1:761)
6. Dalarna County (1:784)
7. Södermanland County (1:881)
8. Uppsala County (1:918)
9. Örebro County (1:1,026)
10. Västmanland County (1:1,099)
11. Värmland County (1:1,119)

In Finland, the frequency of the surname was higher than national average (1:2,697) in the following regions:

1. Åland (1:263)
2. Ostrobothnia (1:619)
3. Uusimaa (1:1,416)
4. Central Ostrobothnia (1:1,423)
5. Southwest Finland (1:2,030)

== People ==
- Anna Sundström (1785–1871), chemist
- Alexander Sundström (born 1987), ice hockey player
- Fanny Sundström (1883–1944), politician and women's right activist
- Henrik Sundström (born 1964), tennis player
- Holger Sundström (1925–2023), sailor
- Joakim Sundström (born 1965), sound editor and musician
- Kalle Sundström, Finnish musician
- Linus Sundström (born 1990), speedway rider
- Liselotte Sundström (born 1955), evolutionary biologist
- Niklas Sundström (born 1975), ice hockey player
- Pär Sundström (born 1981), bassist
- Patrik Sundström (born 1961), ice hockey player, twin brother of Peter Sundström
- Patrik Sundström (footballer) (born 1970), footballer
- Peter Sundström (born 1961), ice hockey player, twin brother of Patrik Sundström
- Rebecca Louisa Ferguson Sundström (born 1983), actress
- Stefan Sundström (born 1960), singer/songwriter
- Tryggve Sundström (1920–1984), bobsledder
