= Rackenford and Knowstone Moors =

Nature reserve in Devon, England

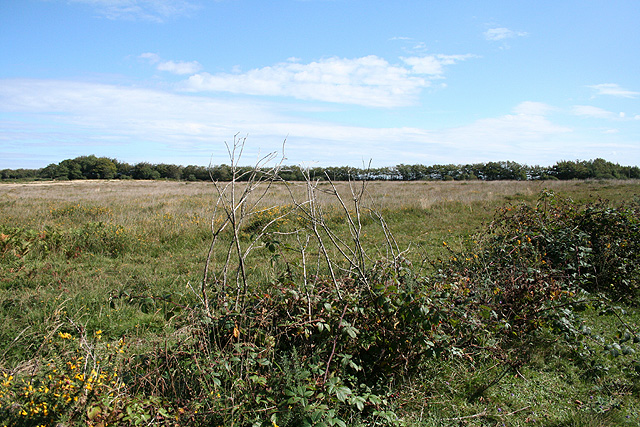
- Looking south-east on Knowstone Outer Moor

- Location within Devon
- Location: near Tiverton, Devon
- OS grid: SS 851 211
- Coordinates: 50°58′40″N 3°38′17″W
- Area: 122 hectares (300 acres)
- Operator: Devon Wildlife Trust
- Designation: Site of Special Scientific Interest; Special Area of Conservation
- Website: www.devonwildlifetrust.org/nature-reserves/rackenford-and-knowstone-moors

Rackenford and Knowstone Moors is a nature reserve of the Devon Wildlife Trust, situated about 8 miles (13 km) north-west of Tiverton, in Devon, England. The habitat is culm grassland.

== Description ==
The reserve is a Site of Special Scientific Interest and a Special Area of Conservation. Its area is 122 hectares (300 acres).

Culm grassland is found in poorly drained lowland areas of acidic soil where there is high rainfall. The vegetation includes abundant purple moor grass and sharp-flowered rush.

Over the last century, over 90% of culm grassland has been lost. The remaining parts are mostly in fragmented areas in north Devon; the most extensive fragment is this reserve. The Trust endeavours to protect, re-establish and link together isolated sites of culm grassland. In the reserve there is light grazing by cattle and deer; the low-intensity land management, little changed from prehistoric times, allows a wide diversity of plant species.

=== Species ===
In the wetter areas, besides purple moor grass and sharp-flowered rush, species include ragged-robin, meadowsweet and wild angelica; in waterlogged areas there is sphagnum moss and sundew. In dry areas there is saw-wort, thistles and heathers. The plants support many species of butterflies, such as small pearl-bordered fritillary, marbled white and dingy skipper; birds including curlew, snipe and reed bunting may be found.

=== Prehistoric site ===
On Knowstone Inner Moor there is saucer barrow, of the early Bronze Age: it is a mound, diameter 5.7 metres (19 ft) and height up to 1 metre (3 ft 3 in), surrounded by a ditch and outer bank.

== See also ==
- Culm Measures
- Dunsdon National Nature Reserve
