= Exeter Valley Parks =

Group of parks in Exeter, England

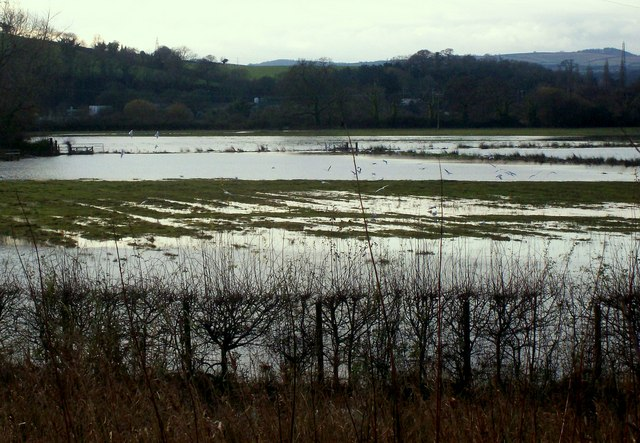
Riverside Valley Park: the floodplain of the River Exe

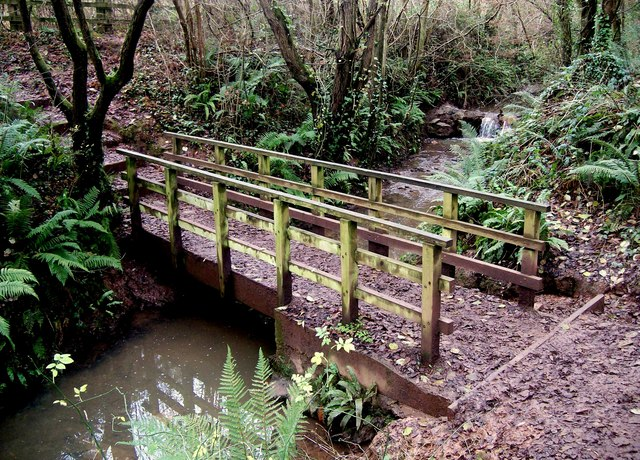
Mincinglake Valley Park

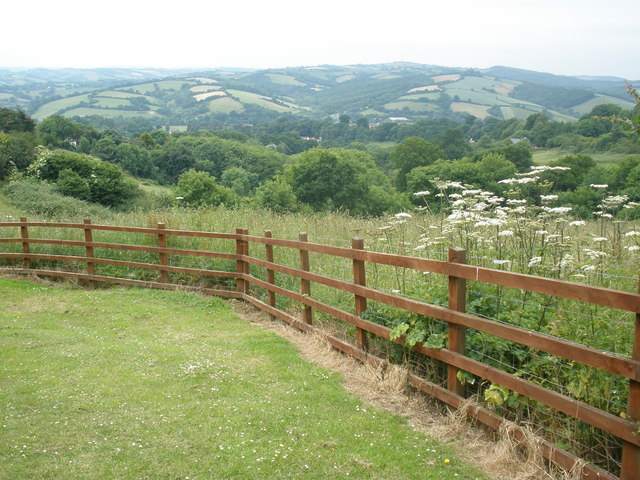
View from Duryard Valley Park

Exeter Valley Parks are six parks around Exeter, England, managed by Devon Wildlife Trust. The management was transferred from Exeter City Council, which owns the parks, in May 2019.

== The parks ==
- Ludwell Valley Park. South-east of the city centre at 50.70916°N 3.49721°W. Size 50 hectares (120 acres). Access is from Ludwell Lane, Topsham Road, Parkland Drive or Pynes Hill. There are several circular walks. There are fields and wooded lanes; the area is a habitat for much wildlife.
- Riverside Valley Park. Between the River Exe and Exeter Ship Canal, one mile downriver from Exeter Quay, lying between Clapperbrook Lane in the north-west and Bridge Road in the south-east.50.69849°N 3.50488°W. Size 40 hectares (99 acres). There is a path alongside the River Exe and flood plain meadows.
- Mincinglake Valley Park. North-east of the city centre, at 50.74016°N 3.50786°W. Size 19 hectares (47 acres). There are paths through woodland and along streams; on Stoke Hill there are wildflower meadows, and views across the city towards the Exe estuary.
- Barley Valley Park. West of the city centre, at 50.72098°N 3.55921°W. Size 11 hectares (27 acres). Access is from Higher Barley Mount or from the end of Antonine Crescent. There are paths and bridleways through woods and meadows, on the western ridge line of the city.
- Duryard and Belvidere Valley Park. Two sites north of the city centre, near the University of Exeter: Duryard at 50.74554°N 3.52729°W, off Pennsylvania Road; and Belvidere at 50.74090°N 3.53276°W, off Belvidere Road. Total size 11 hectares (27 acres).
- Whitycombe Valley Park. North-west of the city centre, at 50.73451°N 3.56329°W. Size 1 hectare (2.5 acres). A meadow accessed from Whitycombe Way, with views across the city.
