= South Efford Marsh =

Nature reserve in Devon, England

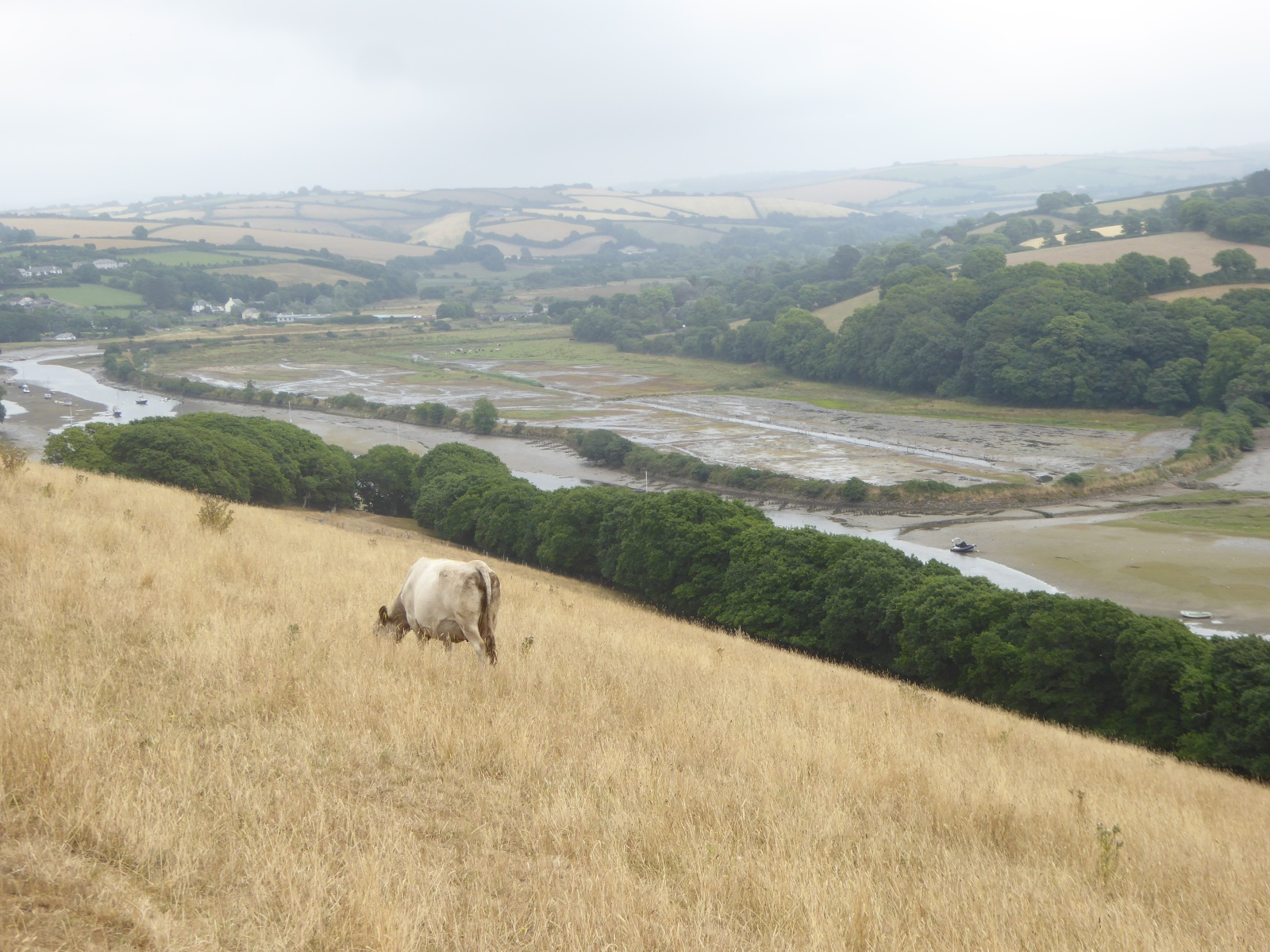
- Viewed from across the Avon

- Location within Devon
- Location: near Aveton Gifford
- OS grid: SX 688 468
- Coordinates: 50.3070°N 3.8446°W
- Area: 17 hectares (42 acres)
- Operator: Devon Wildlife Trust
- Website: South Efford Marsh

South Efford Marsh is a nature reserve of the Devon Wildlife Trust. It is situated by the River Avon, about 0.5 miles (0.8 km) south-west of the village of Aveton Gifford, in Devon, England.

== Description ==
The site, area 17 hectares (42 acres), is leased by the Devon Wildlife Trust. It was bought by the Environment Agency in 2009; it had been a grazing marsh by the river estuary since the 1780s, when a retaining wall was built. A tidal gate was installed in 2011, which allows sea water to flow in at high tide. There is now pasture and a developing saltmarsh. Cattle are sometimes put in the marshy fields in order to keep down coarser plants.

There is a footpath around the northern half of the site; visitors are discouraged from exploring the more open southern half, where there may be nesting and feeding birds.

=== Birdwatching ===
There is a bird hide, with all-round views, at the end of the perimeter path.

There are different habitats in the site. In the northern half are sedge warbler, reed bunting and kingfisher; on the banks next to the river, birds to be seen include linnet, whitethroat and chiffchaff; in the salt and brackish water in the south, black-tailed godwit, green sandpiper and oystercatcher are among the birds that may be seen.
