= Ludwell Valley Park =

Parks in United Kingdom

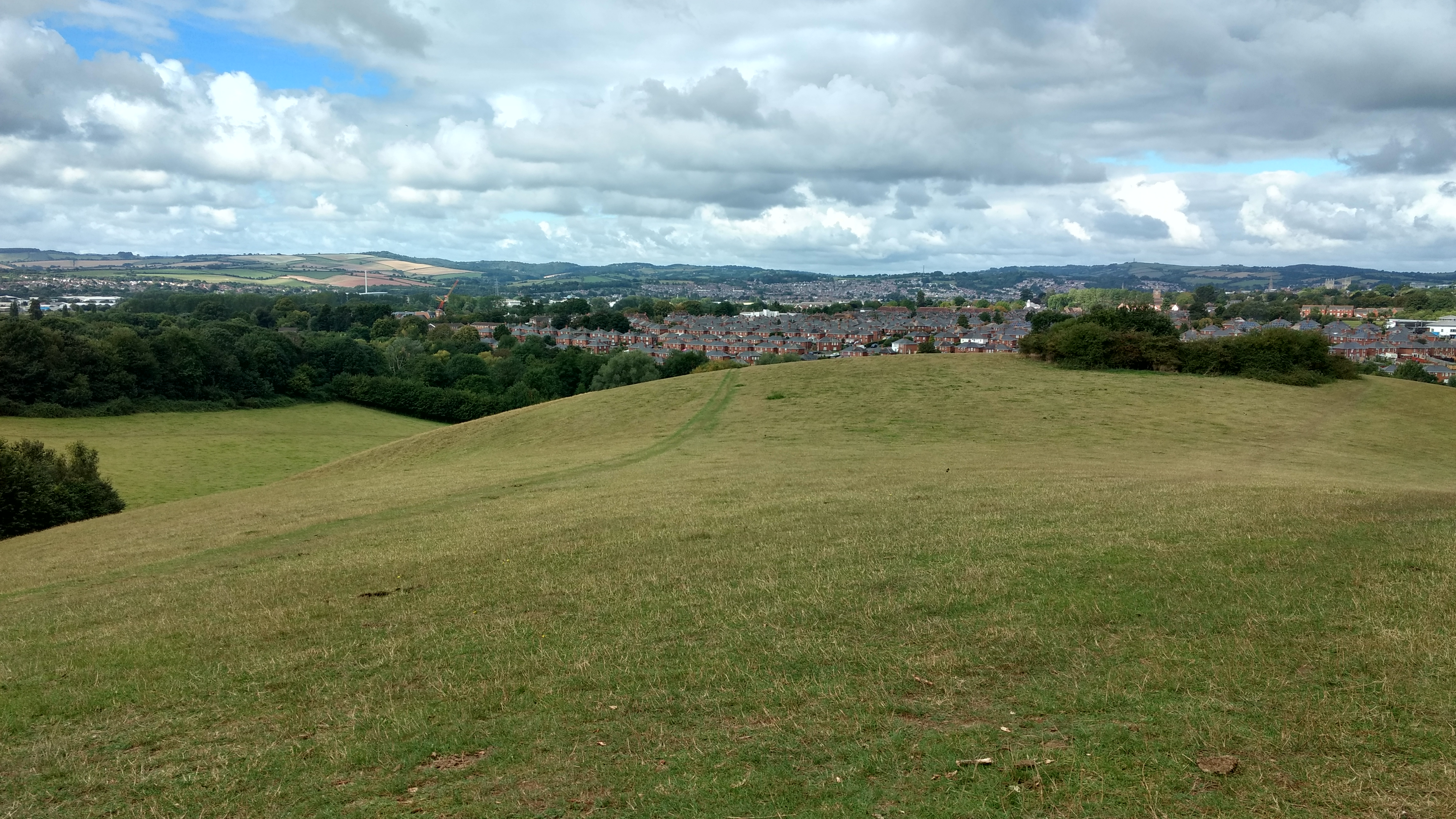
- View from top of Ludwell Valley Park
- Interactive map of Ludwell Valley Park
- Location: (United Kingdom) Exeter, Devon
- Coordinates: 50.7093°N 3.4964°W
- Area: 50 hectares (500,000 m^{2})
- Owner: Exeter City Council
- Operator: Devon Wildlife Trust

Ludwell Valley Park is wildlife-focused public park in Exeter, Devon, United Kingdom. The park is owned by Exeter City Council and managed by Devon Wildlife Trust. It has a working farm, with grazing animals, as well as arable fields, in addition to wildflower meadows, woodland, and orchards.

The park is located either side of Ludwell Lane, and extends as far as the Topsham Road to the South West.

== History ==
Exeter City Council began buying previously privately owned farms in the Wonford area of the city in the 1920s. Much of this land was used to build housing such as the garden village around Burnthouse Lane. The Ludwell Valley was kept as farmland, with the council letting the land out to tenants.

In 1983, the area gained protection as the council created the 'Valley Parks' of Exeter.

Once the final tenant farmer died in 1998, the council took back direct control of the land management.

In May 2019, management of the park, along with the other Valley Parks, was transferred to the Devon Wildlife Trust.

== Incidents ==
In July 1993, a 48-year old woman from Torbay was attacked, tied up, and sexually assaulted in the park, with an Exeter man jailed for 18 years for the attack.

A 74 year old woman was murdered in a knife attack on 18 February 2023 at around 4pm, despite the attendance of the air ambulance A man was arrested in Exeter High Street later that evening. Devon and Cornwall Police opened a major incident investigation, named Op Finnart, and a 30 year old man from Exmouth was charged with murder on 20 February.

On the afternoon of Sunday 9 April 2023, a female was allegedly subject to a sexual assault in the park.

== Wildlife ==
The park has a range of wildlife.

The park is home to a flock of Cirl buntings.
