= Cricklepit Mill =

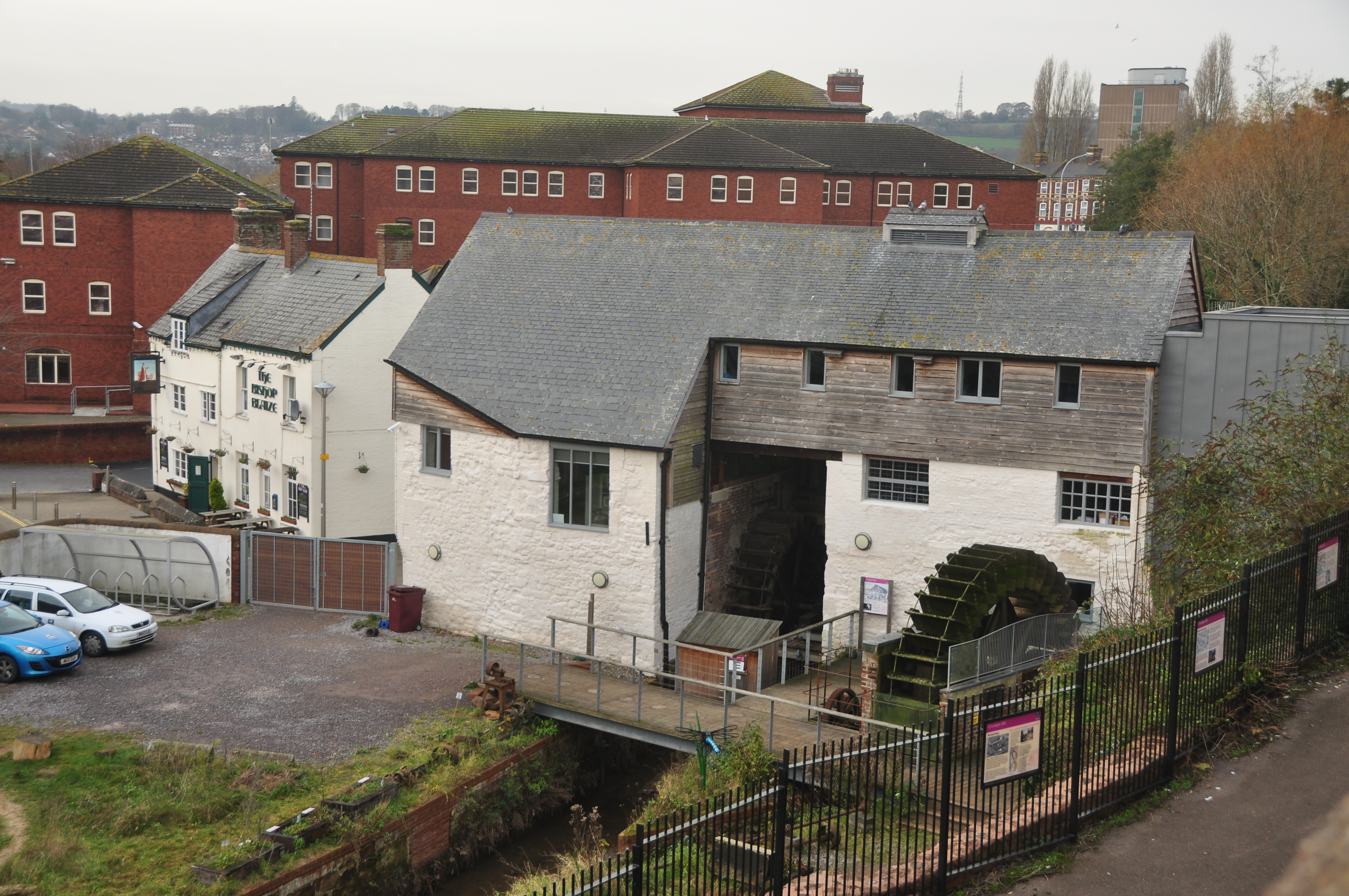
- Interactive map of the Cricklepit Mill area

General information
- Status: Grade II listed
- Type: Watermill
- Location: Exeter grid reference SX 919 922, Commercial Road; Exeter, Devon EX2 4AB
- Coordinates: 50°43′9.1″N 3°32′0.2″W
- Completed: 17th/18th century

Website
- Cricklepit Mill

Cricklepit Mill is a visitor centre of the Devon Wildlife Trust, located in Exeter, in Devon, England.

It is the headquarters of Devon Wildlife Trust, and one of two visitor centres of the Trust; the other is Wembury Marine Centre near Plymouth.

== Description ==
The watermill is a Grade II listed building, dating from the 17th or 18th century, with 19th-century machinery; it has an undershot waterwheel. The building was restored in the 1990s by the Devon Historic Buildings Trust, after it was damaged by fire. In 2004 it was bought by the Devon Wildlife Trust, with funding from the National Lottery Heritage Fund.

There is a wildlife garden next to the mill, looked after by volunteers. The garden is open to the public Monday to Friday.
