= Dunsdon National Nature Reserve =

Nature reserve in Devon, England

- Location within Devon
- OS grid: SS 301 079
- Coordinates: 50.8454°N 4.41436°W
- Area: 63 hectares (160 acres)
- Operator: Devon Wildlife Trust
- Designation: National nature reserve Site of Special Scientific Interest
- Website: www.devonwildlifetrust.org/nature-reserves/dunsdon

Dunsdon National Nature Reserve is a nature reserve of the Devon Wildlife Trust, near Dunsdon and about 3.5 miles (5.6 km) north-west of Holsworthy, in Devon, England. The habitat is culm grassland.

== Description ==
The reserve, area 63 hectares (160 acres), is a national nature reserve, and a Site of Special Scientific Interest.

Culm grassland is found in poorly drained lowland areas of acidic soil where there is high rainfall. The vegetation includes abundant purple moor grass and sharp-flowered rush. Over the last century, over 90% of culm grassland has been lost. The remaining parts are mostly in fragmented areas in north Devon. The Trust endeavours to protect, re-establish and link together isolated sites of culm grassland.

Dunsdon was purchased by the Trust in 2000. It was previously managed by the same family since 1927, so its history of traditional land management through decades is known, and can be compared with sites which have suffered neglect. In the reserve there is grazing by Devon ruby cattle from late summer to early autumn; there is swaling of areas in winter to remove dead grass and allow delicate plants to survive. The traditional low-intensity land management allows a wide diversity of plant species. Flowers are harvested each year to create new wildflower meadows nearby.

=== Species ===
189 species of flowering plant have been found, including the lesser butterfly-orchid, a rare species for which particular improvements have been made in the reserve to help its survival. 26 species of butterfly, including the marsh fritillary, have been seen. Over 70 bird species have been recorded; breeding birds include skylark, song thrush, spotted flycatcher, reed bunting and willow warbler.

=== Coronation Meadow ===
In 2012, Dunsdon was named Devon's Coronation Meadow, part of a project led by the charity Plantlife to name a wildflower meadow in every county to celebrate 60 years since the Coronation of Elizabeth II.

== See also ==
- Culm Measures
- Rackenford and Knowstone Moors
