= Battle of Bovey Heath =

Battle of the First English Civil War

- Part of the First English Civil War
Date	9 January 1646
Location	Bovey Heath, near Bovey Tracey 50°34′32″N 3°40′00″W
Result	Parliamentarian victory

Belligerents
Royalists	Parliamentarians

Commanders and leaders
Lord Wentworth	Oliver Cromwell
- Location within Devon

The battle of Bovey Heath took place on 9 January 1646 at Bovey Tracey and Bovey Heath (about 10 miles (16 km) south-west of Exeter in Devon, England) during the First English Civil War. A Parliamentarian cavalry detachment under the command of Oliver Cromwell surprised and routed the Lord Wentworth's Royalist camp.

After a series of losses for the Royalists in the southwest of England, they had retreated to Exeter and beyond. The Parliamentarian New Model Army besieged Exeter, and when a Royalist army was raised to try to relieve the city, the Parliamentarian commander, Sir Thomas Fairfax launched a preemptive strike. He first sent Cromwell to attack the cavalry lodged at Bovey Heath, where they were able to rout the Royalists who were not prepared for an attack. Wentworth and most of his leading commanders were able to escape, but Wentworth was stripped of command of the Royalist army in the West, which passed to the Lord Hopton.

== Background ==
In early 1645, the southwest of England was predominantly held by the Royalists. After the Parliamentarians secured victory at Naseby in Northamptonshire in June that year, Sir Thomas Fairfax turned his attention, and the newly formed New Model Army to the south-west. They defeated the Royalists again at Langport in July, forcing the King's army in the west country to retreat to Exeter, though the cavalry were not allowed in the city. After securing Somerset, Fairfax established a siege of Exeter late in 1645.

== Prelude ==
At the start of 1646, rather than maintaining winter quarters, Prince Charles, the Prince of Wales, began to gather an army in south Devon to relieve Exeter. Thomas Wentworth, 5th Baron Wentworth had been given command of the Royalist army in the southwest by the Prince after Lord Goring left the war and escaped to France. He was quartered at Bovey Tracey (about 10 miles (16 km) south-west of Exeter) with three regiments of cavalry which had not been allowed into Exeter.

News reached the Parliamentarian commanders of the enemy forces' approach, and Fairfax split part of his army off from the siege to face the new threat. He sent a small cavalry detachment, under the command of Oliver Cromwell, to Bovey Tracey.

== Battle ==
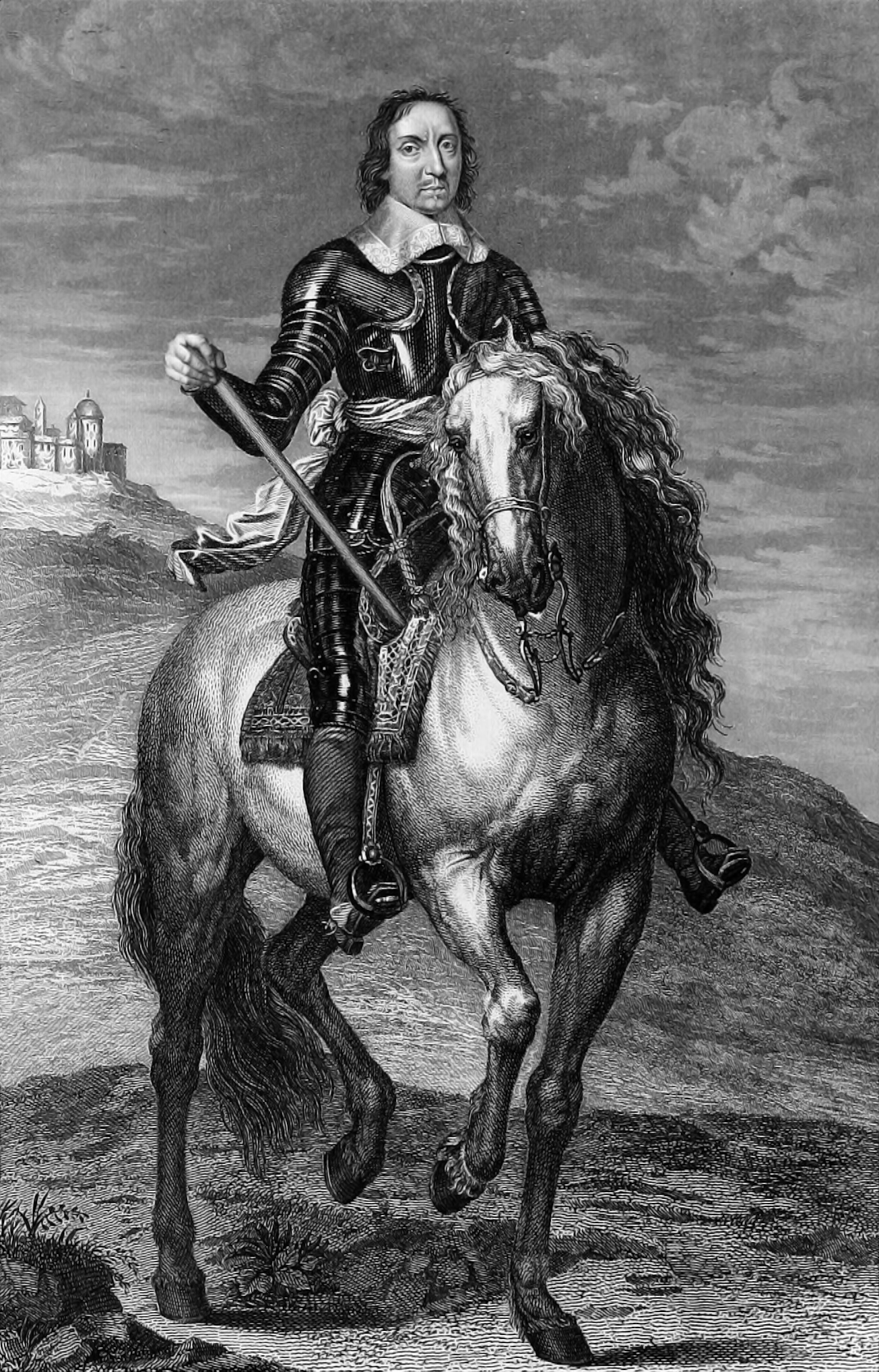
Oliver Cromwell led the Parliamentarian attack.

Wentworth was viewed poorly by some Royalist contemporaries; Richard Bulstrode described him as "a very lazy and unactive man", and he had fallen out with one of the other Royalist commanders in the region, the Lord Hopton. In his history, Amos Miller describes that Wentworth "allowed his officers to keep lax guard", and Cromwell was able to surprise the Royalists with a night attack. The Royalist officers were playing cards when the attack was made, and were only able to escape out of the back door of their inn by "throwing their stakes of money out of the window", causing the Parliamentarian soldiers to break off their attack to try and gather the money. Wentworth, his principal officers and the majority of their men were able to escape the attack, but Cromwell succeeded in capturing 400 horses and seven colours, including the King's.

== Aftermath ==
Wentworth escaped to Tavistock, where he reported the attack to Prince Charles. The news led the Prince to abandon his plans to relieve Exeter, and Charles retreated further into the southwest, to Launceston. Sir Richard Grenville and other Royalist leaders petitioned the Prince for a new commander of the Royalist army, and Lord Hopton was duly appointed the role. Wentworth remained as general of the horse, reporting to Hopton.

Fairfax subsequently led his army into south Devon, but found that the Royalists had abandoned their garrisons in Ashburton, Totnes and other villages in the area. Fairfax established his army outside Dartmouth on 12 January and captured the port on 19 January, effectively ending Royalist hopes of relieving Exeter. Hopton was defeated at Torrington in February, and the following month the last remnants of the Royalist army in southwest England surrendered in Truro. Exeter fell to the Parliamentarians in April, and when first King Charles I and then the Royalist-held Oxford surrendered, the First Civil War was effectively concluded in June 1646.

== Bibliography ==
- Andriette, Eugene A. (1971). Devon and Exeter in the Civil War. Newton Abbot: David and Charles. ISBN 978-0-715352-56-4.
- Barratt, John (2005). The Civil War in the South-West. Barnsley: Pen & Sword Military. ISBN 1-84415-146-8.
- Bennett, Martyn (2016). Historical Dictionary of the British and Irish Civil Wars 1637–1660. London: Rowman & Littlefield. ISBN 978-1-442262-64-5.
- Besley, Henry (1846). The Route Book of Devon: A Guide for the stranger and tourist. Exeter: Henry Besley. OCLC 795026712.
- Bulstrode, Richard (1721). Memoirs and reflections upon the reign and government of King Charles the Ist. and King Charles the IId. London: Printed by N. Mist, for C. Rivington. OCLC 2143360.
- Cornforth, David (22 April 2009). "Exeter during the Civil War". Exeter Memories.
- Fraser, Antonia (2008). Cromwell, Our Chief Of Men. London: Phoenix. ISBN 978-0-7538-1331-7.
- Manganiello, Stephen C. (2004). The Concise Encyclopedia of the Revolutions and Wars of England, Scotland, and Ireland, 1639–1660. Lanham, Maryland: The Scarecrow Press. ISBN 0-8108-5100-8.
- Miller, Amos (1979). Sir Richard Grenville of the Civil War. London: Phillimore. ISBN 978-0-850333-30-5.
- Newman, P.R. (1998) [1985]. Atlas of the English Civil War. London: Routledge. ISBN 0-415-19609-4.
- Reid, Stuart (2004). "Wentworth, Thomas, fifth Baron Wentworth". Oxford Dictionary of National Biography (online ed.). Oxford University Press. doi:10.1093/ref:odnb/29057. (Subscription, Wikipedia Library access or UK public library membership required.)
- Venning, Timothy (2015). An Alternative History of Britain: The English Civil War. Barnsley: Pen & Sword Military. ISBN 978-1-4738-2782-0.
- Wallace, David C. (2013). Twenty two turbulent years 1639–1661. Peterborough: Fastprint Publishing. ISBN 978-178035-660-0.
