= Andrew's Wood =

Nature reserve in south Devon, England

- Site of Special Scientific Interest
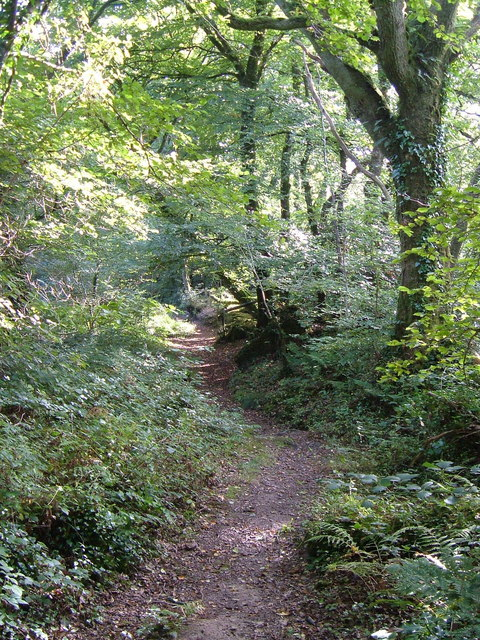

- Location within Devon
- Location of Andrew's Wood.
- Area of search: Devon
- Grid reference: SX708515
- Coordinates: 50.349661°N 3.816638°W
- Interest: Biological
- Area: 23.5 ha (58 acres)
- Notification date: 1952

Andrews Wood, (near Modbury in Devon), is a nature reserve managed by the Devon Wildlife Trust.

It is also a 23.5 hectare biological Site of Special Scientific Interest, notified in 1952.

The site supports the largest colony of Heath Lobelia (Lobelia urens) in Great Britain. In 2009, 9828 plants were recorded.

== See also ==
- List of Sites of Special Scientific Interest in Devon
