= Redlake Meadows & Hoggs Moor =

Site of Special Scientific Interest in Cornwall, England

- Site of Special Scientific Interest
- Location within Cornwall Location within England
- Location of Redlake Meadows & Hoggs Moor.
- Area of search: Cornwall
- Grid reference: SX128590
- Coordinates: 50.4024°N 4.6359°W
- Interest: Biological
- Area: 30.53 hectares (0.305 km^{2}; 0.118 sq mi)
- Notification date: 1995

Redlake Meadows & Hoggs Moor is a Site of Special Scientific Interest (SSSI), noted for its biological characteristics, in Cornwall, England, UK. Within the SSSI is Redlake Cottage Meadows nature reserve owned by the Cornwall Wildlife Trust.

== Geography ==
The 30.5-hectare (75-acre) SSSI is situated within St Winnow civil parish, 1.5 kilometres (0.93 mi) east of the town of Lostwithiel, between two tributaries of the River Lerryn. The nature reserve covers the central 13 hectares (32 acres) of the SSSI.

== Flora and fauna ==
Both the rare heath lobelia (Lobelia urens) and the vulnerable and protected marsh fritillary butterfly are found there. After the sighting of the latter species in 1995, Cornwall Wildlife Trust received a grant from the Hanson Environment Fund that enabled the trust to protect it through scrub control and fencing. Other nationally scarce species include Wavy-leaved St John's-wort (Hypericum undulatum) and yellow bartsia (Parentucellia viscosa).

10 native breed ponies have been introduced to help manage the site.
