= River Lerryn =

River in east Cornwall, England

Coordinates: 50°22′20″N 4°38′13″W

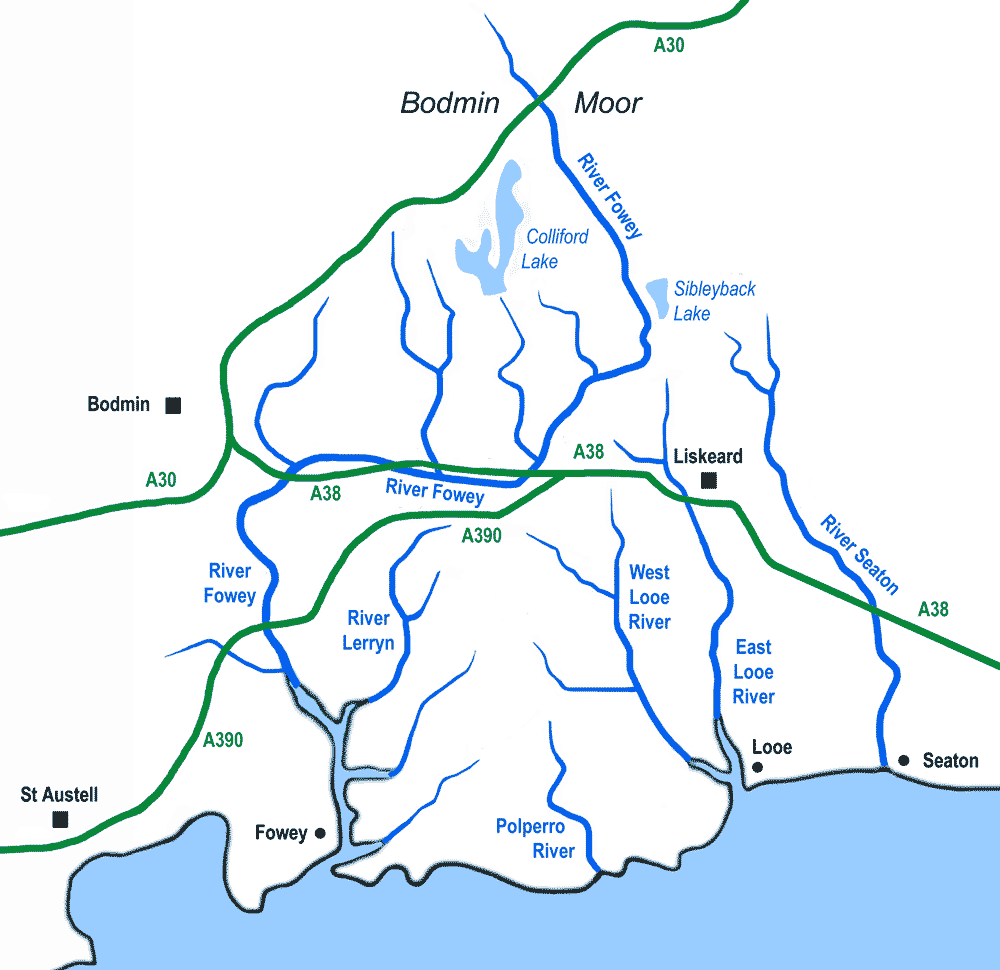
Rivers south of Bodmin Moor

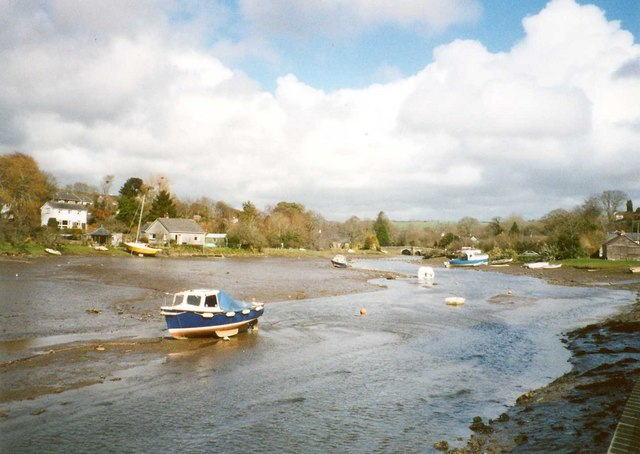
The River Lerryn at low tide

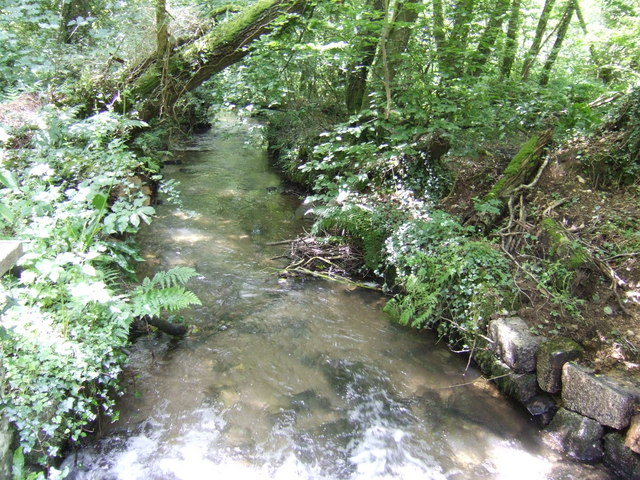
The River Lerryn at Tallowater

The River Lerryn is a river in east Cornwall, England, UK, a tributary of the River Fowey. The Lerryn is the largest of the tributaries which enter the estuary of the Fowey. The river is tidal up to the village of Lerryn. The landscape of the Lerryn catchment is rural and includes heathland, moorland and rough pasture in the upper reaches and broadleaf, coniferous and mixed plantation woodland in the lower. This catchment includes four Sites of Special Scientific Interest, including Redlake Meadows & Hoggs Moor. The Lerryn rises at Fairy Cross (Grid ref. SX1262) on the southern slopes of Bodmin Moor and flows south-southwest until it enters the Fowey estuary (Grid ref. SX1255).

The name of the river is Cornish; the earliest record of it is as "Leryan" and "Lerion" in 1289. In modern Cornish its name would be Dowr Leryon, meaning "river of floods". The village of Lerryn is named after the river.
