= Bovey Heath =

Area of heathland in Devon, England

Coordinates: 50°34′32″N 3°40′00″W

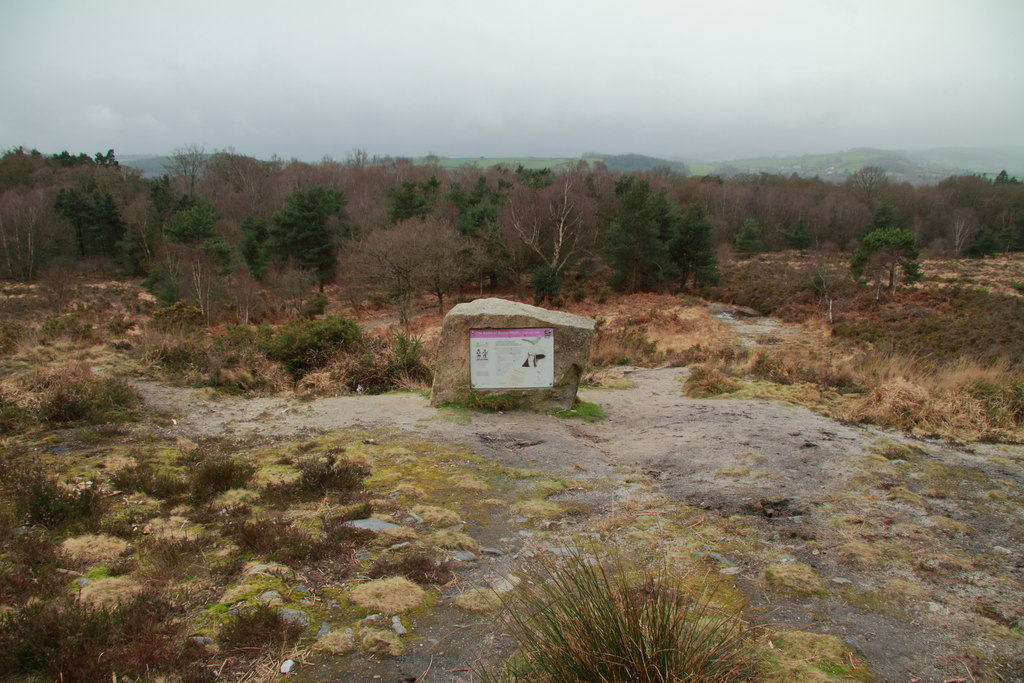
Bovey Heath

Bovey Heath is a 32 hectare (50 acre) area of heathland between Bovey Tracey and Heathfield in south Devon, England.

Although primarily heathland habitat, the site has some wet mature oak woodland, and is home to rare species such as the Dartford warbler, European stonechat, European nightjar and the narrow headed ant. The reserve has been a Site of Special Scientific Interest since 1989. It became a Devon Wildlife Trust nature reserve in 2002 and a Local Nature Reserve in 2003.

== History ==
The heath was probably created around 4000 years ago through the actions of Bronze Age farmers who would have cleared areas of woodland for grazing and the cultivation of crops. There is at least one Bronze Age tumulus on the site.

The Battle of Bovey Heath, a regionally decisive battle during the English Civil War, took place here on 9 January 1646. The site holds one of only two earthworks in the South West dating to this period; it is a Scheduled Ancient Monument. At the time the heath was over 380 hectares (1000 acres) in size, but in the 19th and 20th centuries much of it was destroyed by open-cast mining for ball clay. During the Second World War and for a short time after, the site was used as a training ground for American soldiers.

Since the war the remaining heath was badly neglected, used as a dumping ground and a place for unauthorised off-roading. This activity was halted by Devon Wildlife Trust when it took over the site.
