= Liselotte Sundström =

Zoologist (b. 1955)

- Sundström In 2018
- Born: 16 July 1955 (age 71)
- Education: University of Helsinki (MSc 1986); University of Helsinki (PhD 1994)
- Scientific career
- Fields: Evolutionary biology Population biology
- Workplaces: University of Lausanne Aarhus University University of Helsinki

Liselotte Sundström (born 16 July 1955 in Helsinki) is a Finnish zoologist. She is professor emerita of evolutionary biology at the University of Helsinki.

== Early career ==
Sundström gained her doctoral thesis and docentship in 1994. She carried out postdoctoral research at the University of Lausanne during 1994-1995, which was funded by a grant for research from the Academy of Finland as well as employment at the university. She went on to work at the University of Aarhus in the years 1995-1996. In 1996 she returned to the University of Helsinki where she became a lecturer at the Department of Ecology and Systematics. From 1998 to 2002 she worked as an Academy Research Fellow and in 2002 she was appointed Swedish-speaking Professor of Evolutionary Biology (formerly Zoology).

== Key research contributions ==
Sundström is an evolutionary biologist with a focus on social evolution, particularly in ants. The goal is to understand the evolution of altruism in the animal world (in particular the basis of the theory of kin selection) and the balance between altruistic and selfish behaviour which, from an evolutionary perspective, determines the emergence and functioning of social insect societies.

Her contribution to our understanding of conflict resolution in the social insects combines multiple approaches: by bringing together behavioural experiments, the analysis of chemical recognition cues, and genetic methods, Sundström's work has provided numerous new insights into the complex dynamics of the ant colony. For example, she demonstrated that the number of times an ant queen has mated changes the social conditions in the colony, resulting in worker manipulation of the sex ratio. These findings demonstrate support for the predictions of inclusive fitness theory.

Sundström has also made significant contributions to population biology, in particular with relation to life history trade-offs. This work is founded on a long-term dataset she has collected by studying a population of the wood ant Formica exsecta in an archipelago near the Tvärminne zoological station in southern Finland since 1994. Her work has described patterns of dispersal and inbreeding in this fragmented population.

== Current research ==
As part of the Global Ant Genomics Alliance Sundström is contributing to compiling a comprehensive dataset of the genomic diversity of the world's ant genera.

== Academic roles ==
Sundström was vice-dean of the Faculty of Biological and Environmental sciences of the University of Helsinki from 2014 until 2017. In addition, from 2012 to 2017 she led the Centre of Excellence in Biological Interactions along with Johanna Mappes, Hanna Kokko and Jaana Bamford and was the director of the Doctoral Programme in Wildlife Biology Research of the University of Helsinki over the same time period. Sundström has published over 100 scholarly articles and has supervised or co-supervised 14 PhD students. She is a member of the editorial boards of several international journals including Behavioral Ecology and Sociobiology, Entomologia and Insectes Sociaux and a former member of the editorial boards of Evolution, Journal of Evolutionary Biology, Proceedings of the Royal Society B: Biological Sciences and Behavioral Ecology.

== Honors and distinctions ==
Sundström was elected member of The Finnish Society of Sciences and Letters. She was awarded membership of AcademiaNet in 2013, a portal for outstanding women academics and scientists. She is also a Winner of the Stora Priset Award, 2001.

== Selected works ==
- Sundstrom, L.; Chapuisat, M.; Keller, L. (1996) "Conditional manipulation of sex ratios by ant workers: A test of kin selection theory". Science. 274 (5289): 993-995. doi:10.1126/science.274.5289.993 PMID 8875943
- Sundstrom, L. (1994) "Sex-ratio bias, relatedness asymmetry and queen mating frequency in ants". Nature. 367 (6460): 266-267. doi:10.1038/367266a0
- Sundstrom, L. (1993) "Genetic population structure and sociogenetic organisation in Formica truncorum (Hymenoptera; Formicidae)" Behavioral Ecology and Sociobiology. 33 (5): 345-354. doi:10.1007/BF00172934
- Helantera, H.; Sundstrom L. (2007) "Worker reproduction in Formica ants". American Naturalist. 170 (1): E14-E25. doi:10.1086/518185
- Sundstrom, L.; Seppa, P; Pamilo, P. (2005) "Genetic population structure and dispersal patterns in Formica ants - a review". Annales Zoologici Fennici. 42 (3): 163-177.
- Bos, N.; Sundstrom, L.; Fuchs, S.; Freitak, D. (2015) "Ants medicate to fight disease". Evolution. 69 (11): 2979-2984. doi:10.1111/evo.12752
- Sundstrom, L. (1995) "Sex allocation and colony maintenance in monogyne and polygyne colonies of Formica truncorum (Hymenoptera: Formicidae): The impact of kinship and mating structure". American Naturalist. 146 (2): 182-201. doi:10.1086/285794
- Vitikainen, E. I. K.; Haag-Liautard, C.; Sundstrom, L. (2015) "Natal dispersal, mating patterns and inbreeding in the ant Formica exsecta". American Naturalist. 186 (6): 716-727. doi: 10.1086/683799 PMID: 26655979
- Sundstrom, L.; Keller, L.; Chapuisat, M. (2007) "Inbreeding and sex-biased gene flow in the ant Formica exsecta". Evolution. 57 (7): 1552-1561 doi:10.1111/j.0014-3820.2003.tb00363.x
