= North Devon's Biosphere Reserve =

UNESCO biosphere reserve in North Devon, England

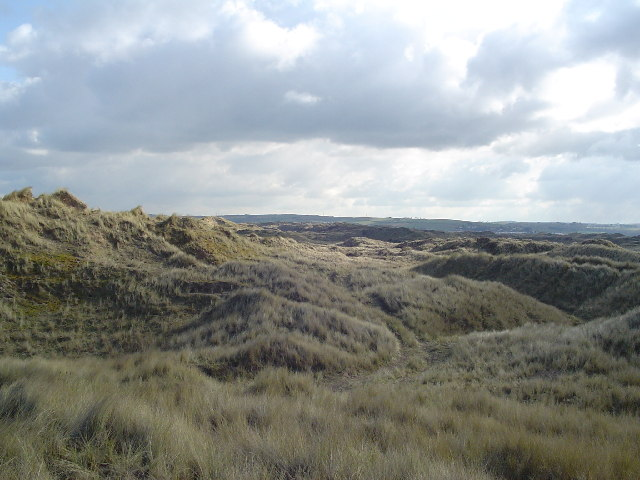
- Braunton Burrows, the core area of the biosphere reserve

- Boundaries of North Devon's Biosphere Reserve
- Location: Devon, England
- Coordinates: 51°5′N 04°24′W
- Area: 5,262 km^{2} (2,032 sq mi)
- Established: 1976
- Governing body: North Devon's Biosphere Reserve Partnership
- Website: http://www.northdevonbiosphere.org.uk/

North Devon's Biosphere Reserve is a UNESCO biosphere reserve in North Devon. It covers 5,262 square kilometres (2,032 sq mi) and is centred on Braunton Burrows, the largest sand dune system (psammosere) in England. The boundaries of the reserve follow the edges of the conjoined catchment basin of the Rivers Taw and the Torridge and stretch out to sea to include the island of Lundy. The biosphere reserve is primarily lowland farmland, and includes many protected sites including 63 Sites of Special Scientific Interest which protect habitats such as culm grassland and broadleaved woodlands. The most populous settlements in its buffer area are Barnstaple, Bideford, Northam, Ilfracombe, and Okehampton.

The reserve was the first of the "new style" of UNESCO biosphere reserves in the United Kingdom when it was expanded from its previous area in 2002. The new guidelines encourage its management to strike a balance between people and conservation of the environment they live in through sustainability, income generation, and a reduction in poverty. It is managed by the Biosphere Reserve Partnership, which includes a number of interested parties such as the Environment Agency, Natural England, Devon Wildlife Trust, and the National Trust. The partnership organises landscape projects and works closely with the inhabitants of the reserve.

Within the reserve's core area are the sand dune system and culm grassland. To the west in Bideford Bay (visible from the beach element of the dunes, Saunton Sands which is a due-west facing surfing beach) is a coral reef with a diversity of coral and marine life seen nowhere else in Britain. The sand dunes have a rich habitat of hundreds of flowering plants while the Taw-Torridge estuary is an important feeding area for long-journey migratory birds.

The economy of North Devon is largely supported by tourism. Four million people per year visit the area, and visitor numbers can rise as high as 60,000 per day in August. Most of these people come because of the environment.

== Geography ==
North Devon's Biosphere Reserve is in northern Devon in South West England. Although mainly in the districts of North Devon and Torridge, the reserve also extends into West and Mid Devon. It covers a large area of sea up to 160 feet (49 m) in depth off the North Devon coast and includes Lundy island 12 miles (19 km) from the shore. The core area is centred on Braunton Burrows, a large sand dune system, which consists of 19 sq mi (49 km^{2}) of sand dunes, slacks (troughs between the dunes), grassland, scrub habitat, and a part of the Taw-Torridge Estuary. The reserve's boundary follows the edges of several river catchment areas, mainly of the River Taw and the River Torridge, but also those of smaller rivers running into the sea between Hartland and Lynton. The North Devon Coast Area of Outstanding Natural Beauty lies at the heart of the reserve, while parts of the national parks of Dartmoor and Exmoor fringe the boundaries.

There are no cities within the reserve. Barnstaple, Bideford, Ilfracombe, Braunton, Northam and Great Torrington contain many of the 155,000 people living in the wider buffer area of the Biosphere. The surrounding towns and villages are also included in reserve projects and policy decisions.

== History ==
There is evidence of humans in North Devon from Mesolithic times onward. Worked pieces of flint or stone, known as flint scatters, that date to this era have been found around Baggy Point in an area where flint does not occur naturally. In the clays beneath the sand of Westward Ho! beach there is a Mesolithic midden, a prehistoric dump for domestic waste, composed of mussels, cockles, peppery furrow shells (Scrobicularia plana), and carpet shells (Venerupis spp.). On Exmoor the remains of small flint tools called microliths, used by hunter-gatherers to hunt and prepare animals, have been found and date to the late Mesolithic. In the Neolithic period, people started to manage animals and grow crops on farms, and started to cut down the woodlands of Exmoor, rather than act purely as hunters and gatherers. These Neolithic people created stone monuments and by the Bronze Age were creating barrows (burial mounds) and roundhouses. Evidence shows that extraction and smelting of mineral ores to make metal tools, weapons, containers and ornaments had started by the Iron Age. Bronze Age barrows have also been found on elevated parts of Bursdon Moor, near Hartland and on Berry Down, near Berrynarbor. Iron Age hill forts were built on prominent parts of the coastline and hinterland. Examples can be found at Hillsborough near Ilfracombe, Embury Beacon and Clovelly Dykes in the Hartland area, with numerous other examples along the coast.

Biosphere reserves are designed to deal with one of the most important
questions the World faces today: How can we reconcile conservation of
biodiversity and biological resources with their sustainable use?

— UNESCO, The Seville strategy for Biosphere Reserves

Many villages and hamlets may be found within the Area of Outstanding Natural Beauty (AONB), most dating back to Saxon times and many recorded in the Domesday Book of 1086. Grade I-listed remains of medieval architecture can be found in Combe Martin, Berrynarbor and in the hamlet of Stoke, near Hartland.

In 1959 the North Devon Coast was designated as an AONB, the first in Devon. In 1976, Braunton Burrows was designated a biosphere reserve under the UNESCO Man and the Biosphere Programme, with a focus on research questions and on environmental conservation. The reserve was greatly expanded in 2002 under a new set of guidelines that promoted the interactions of mankind with nature in terms of sustainable living, income generation, and reducing local poverty. It became the first of these "new style" biosphere reserves in the United Kingdom. The dune system of Braunton Burrows was re-designated as the core area of the biosphere reserve under the revised goals. Since its recognition, the AONB had no management service until the early 1990s when a Heritage Coast Service was formed to manage two defined Heritage Coasts which have similar boundaries to the AONB, the Hartland Heritage Coast and the North Devon Heritage Coast. This service went through a number of name and remit changes, first renamed as the Northern Devon Coast and Countryside Service, and then as the North Devon AONB and Biosphere Service. The establishment of the North Devon AONB Partnership in 2004 led to the service being split to become two separate entities, the North Devon AONB Service and the North Devon Biosphere Service.

== Management ==
UNESCO sets out three functions of a biosphere reserve: conservation, learning and research, and sustainable development. Biosphere reserves aim to create and maintain sustainable communities where people can live and work in an area of high environmental quality; these areas can then provide a blueprint for other areas to learn from. The reserve must be environmentally, economically, and socially sustainable. To achieve this, the reserve oversees management of natural resources, initiatives to develop the local economy, and an effort to reduce inequalities between people.

=== Biosphere Reserve Partnership ===
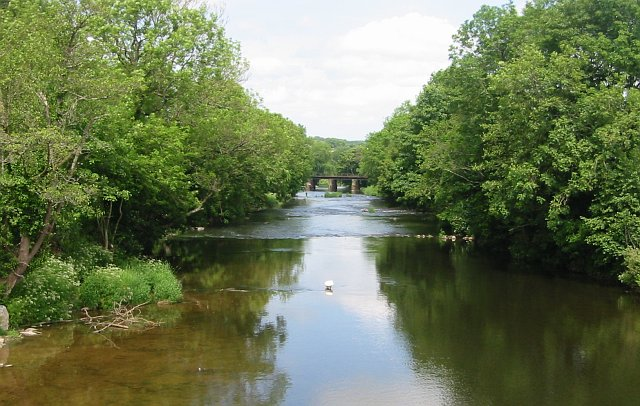
Clean-up of the River Taw is part of an improvement scheme organised by the partnership.

The management of the biosphere reserve is undertaken, on behalf of local authorities and stakeholders, by North Devon's Biosphere Reserve Partnership. The group is composed of a number of interested parties including the Ministry of Defence, Devon County Council, the Environment Agency, Natural England, some educational institutions, national park authorities, representatives from northern Devon commerce and industry, local farmers and fishermen, Devon Wildlife Trust, and the National Trust. The partnership was formed to encourage cooperation between the relevant local authorities in fulfilling their commitments to North Devon's Biosphere Reserve. The partnership is required by the statutory framework for biosphere reserves, the UNESCO Seville 95 Strategy, to develop vision and strategies for the effective functioning of the reserve.

Its remit includes several large-scale projects which have been developed through the partnership. A£1.8 million improvement project along the River Taw, funded by the Environment Agency, is designed to decrease polluted surface runoff from fields and urban areas into the river. The project will restore habitats and remove obstacles such as weirs which prevent animals from freely moving between sections of the river. The decrease in pollution is also hoped to increase beach quality in places such as Instow, which failed water quality tests in 2012, one of only sixteen beaches in the South West to fail. A Nature Improvement Area proposed to protect and enhance the catchment of the River Torridge—home of Tarka the Otter in Henry Williamson's book of the same name—was chosen by the Department for Environment, Food and Rural Affairs (Defra) as one of twelve nationally important landscapes which will receive funding to restore and recreate ecosystems in the area. Other large projects work to use the natural environment to offset the negative impacts of human activities within the Biosphere.

=== Farming ===
The predominant farm type in Devon is livestock farming, which includes dairy, lowland cattle, and sheep farms. In 2006, the total labour force on Devon farms was 23,240 people, with around 7,953 employed full-time. The majority of land within the biosphere reserve is farmland, which helps support the local economy, but is not designated with statutory protection. The reserve is therefore managed carefully with the cooperation of farmers and landowners; as the boundaries of the reserve are the catchment areas of the River Taw and River Torridge, extra precaution must be taken in protecting water supplies from nonpoint source pollution. Rainwater can accumulate residues of fertilisers, especially nitrates and phosphates. Once leached into the rivers they can affect the river ecology through eutrophication, causing damage to plants and animals. This is one of the most pervasive water quality problems in Europe. Pathogens excreted by animals can also directly affect humans when transported by rainwater to rivers and the sea where people swim. Another problem is river sedimentation caused by fine soil particles washing from the land into rivers, this causes high rates of mortality in fish eggs and can affect fish feeding habits. The Biosphere Reserve Partnership provides support to farms that encourage sustainable practices, benefit the environment, and have a good role within the community.

== Ecology ==
North Devon's Biosphere Reserve contains many nationally important habitats including culm grassland (Molinia caerulea and Juncus spp.), broadleaved woodlands, estuaries, and coastal heathland. A 10-year Biodiversity Action Plan for the reserve identifies actions that can be carried out by the partnership to help nature conservation, learning, and research. It also contains 63 Sites of Special Scientific Interest (SSSIs), 671 County Wildlife Sites, a Special Area of Conservation, and six Local Nature Reserves.

The Braunton Burrows core area consists of fixed and mobile sand dune systems with geomorphological and successional processes. There are also variable-flooded slacks, grassland and scrub further inland supporting a wide variety of flowering and lower plants, birds, and insects. It includes the complete successional range of dune plant communities, with over 400 vascular plant species. It is characterised by marram grass (Ammophila arenaria), round-headed club-rush (Scirpoides holoschoenus), sharp rush (Juncus acutus), and willow (Salix) species. On the strandline there is rock sea lavender (Limonium binervosum). The fore and mid dunes are generally sandy yellow dunes, colonised and stabilised by marram grass. Other notable species include sea stock (Matthiola sinuate), sea stork's-bill (Erodium maritimum), sea clover (Trifolium aquamosum), Portland spurge (Euphorbia portlandica), sea spurge (Euphorbia paralias), and white horehound (Marrubium vulgare). Further inland, the stable grey dunes are stabilised by other species such as dune fescue (Vulpia membranacea). The dune slacks, the valleys between the dunes, may flood after heavy rain and are wet and marshy during the winter. They support round-headed club-rush (Scirpoides holoschoenus), sharp rush, round-leaved wintergreen (Pyrola rotundifolia ssp. maritima), early gentian (Gentianella anglica), and many orchid species. Listed as endangered on the Joint Nature Conservation Committee's Vascular Plant Red Data List for Great Britain, the water germander (Teucrium scordium), a perennial plant that lives in the slacks, has just one other population in the UK.

Behind the dunes, grassland, or dune pasture, supports a variety of grasses, sedges and herbs including rough poppy (Papaver hybridum) and toothed medick (Medicago lupulina). Scrub invasion occurs with native species such as willows, privet (Ligustrum vulgare) and common blackberry (Rubus fruticosus), and introduced species such as sea buckthorn (Hippophae rhamnoides). The scrub and grazed vegetation supports lichens such as the sausage lichen (Usnea articulata) and scrambled-egg lichen (Fulgensia fulgens), and around 60 species are found in the compacted soils.

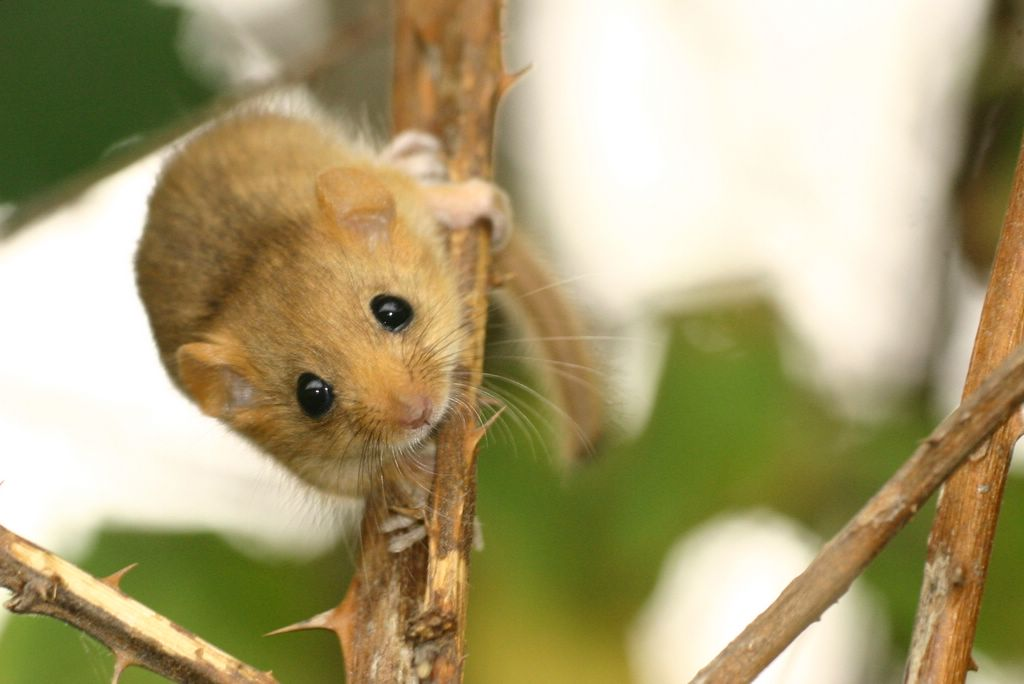
The common dormouse is the only species of dormouse native to Great Britain.

Braunton Burrows, along with the Taw-Torridge Estuary (also an SSSI), is a main route for bird migration along the west coast of Great Britain. Waterfowl winter on the shores of the sea and estuary, while the coastline supports a variety of breeding species such as whitethroats (Sylvia communis) and magpies (Pica pica) in the scrub; skylarks (Alaunda arvensis) and meadow pipits (Anthus pratensis) in the grassland; and wheatears (Oenanthe oenanthe) and shelducks (Tadorna tadorna) in holes or burrows. Invertebrates are abundant throughout the dune system, which includes 30 species of terrestrial or freshwater molluscs, including the sandbowl snail (Catinella arenaria), which is only known in two sites in the UK.

The characteristic and notable species outside the core area include sea purslane (Halimione portulacoides), Salicornia spp., pea crabs that live inside mussels, lugworm, Hydrobia snails, and annual seablite (Suaeda maritima) in estuarine and saltmarsh habitats; common reed (Phragmites australis), creeping bentgrass (Agrostis stolonifera), common rush (Juncus effusus), and fat duckweed (Lemna gibba) in the low and grazing marshland of the floodplains; and hawthorn (Crataegus monogyna), blackthorn (Prunus spinosa), ash (Fraxinus excelsior), crested dog's-tail (Cynosurus cristatus), and creeping bentgrass in mixed farmland. The reserve also contains nationally rare mammals such as the common dormouse and the European otter, the marsh fritillary butterfly, and coral reef off Lundy Island found nowhere else.

== Activities ==
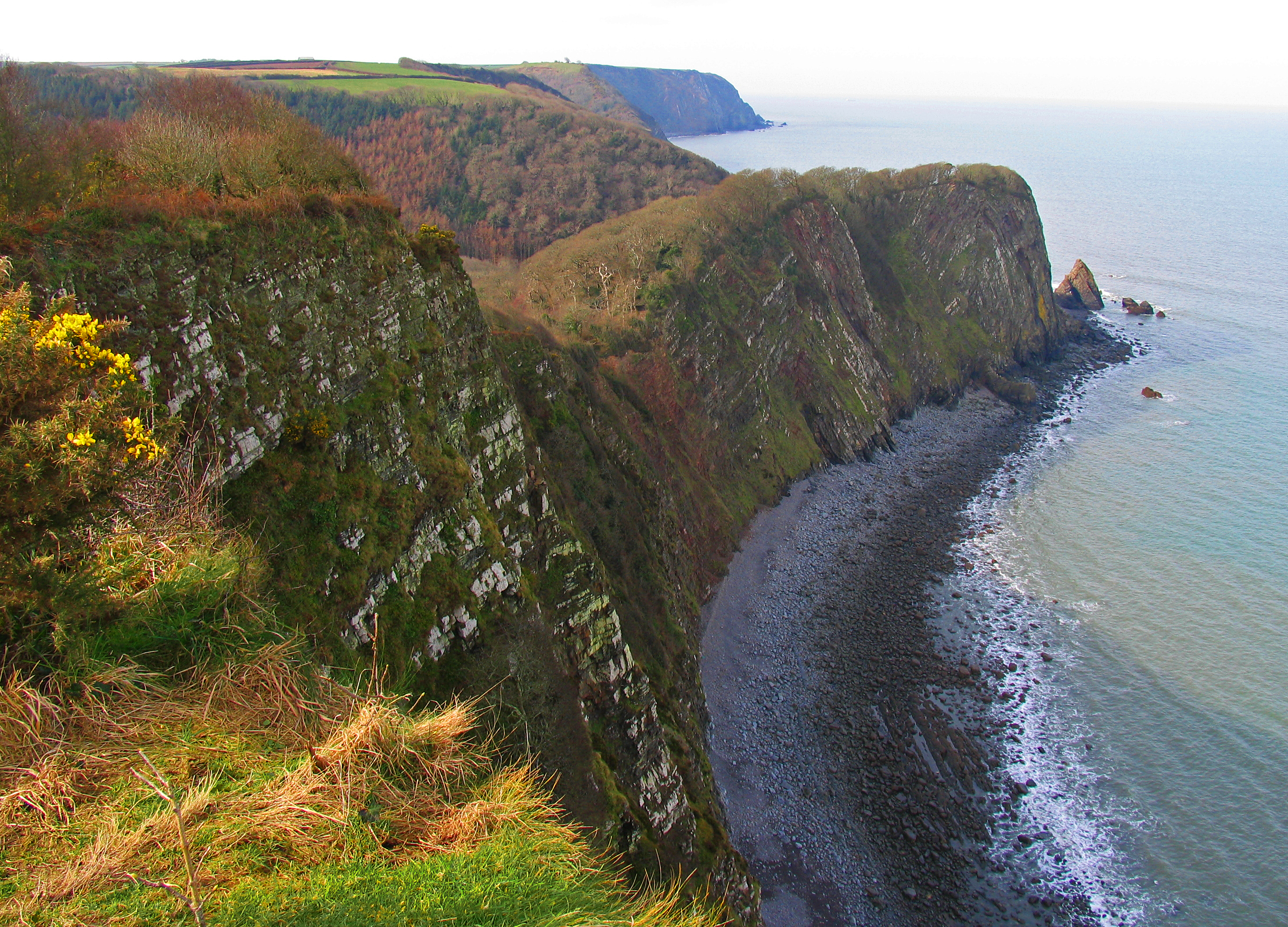
The South West Coast Path follows the North Devon Coast past these cliffs at Clovelly.

North Devon's Biosphere Reserve in its wider definition attracts a large number of visitors each year. Four million people a year visit, up to 60,000 a day in August. Northern Devon receives around 1.4 million visitors during the year who stay within the reserve and contribute over £250 million to the area's economy. Surveys show that 80% of these visit because of the environment.

Walking and hiking opportunities attract a large number of people to North Devon's Biosphere Reserve. There are footpaths throughout the national parks of Exmoor and Dartmoor, and the South West Coast Path stretches along the whole of the north coast of the reserve from Welcombe to Lynton. In 2003 research indicated that the South West Coast Path brought around £300 million a year in total to the South West, which could support more than 7,500 jobs. This research also recorded that 27.6% of visitors to the region came because of the Path, and they spent £136 million in a year. Local people took 23 million walks on the Path and spent a further £116 million, and other visitors contributed the remainder. A further study in 2005 estimated this figure to have risen to around £300 million.

Other popular attractions include surfing, the Tarka Trail, Northam Burrows Country Park, Rosemoor Garden, and Watermouth Castle.
