= Wembury Marine Centre =

Coordinates: 50.318°N 4.078°W

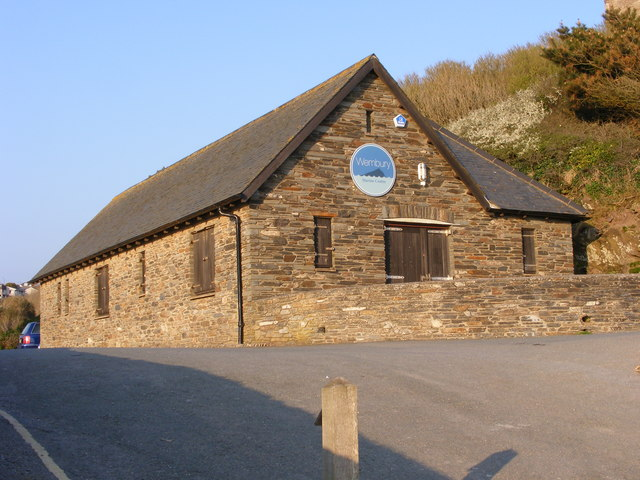
Wembury Marine Centre

Wembury Marine Centre is situated in the small village of Wembury, near Plymouth. Run by Devon Wildlife Trust, it holds rockpool rambles throughout the summer months, educating some 20,000 people each year about the importance of marine life and the need to protect it.

The area is designated a Special Area of Conservation and a Voluntary Marine Conservation Area.

Wembury Marine Centre lies at the heart of the Wembury Voluntary Marine Conservation Area and stretches for four miles from Bovisand in the west to Gara Point in the east.

== Species to look out for ==
Low tide gives the best chance of seeing the rockpool creatures. Some of the likely suspects include the common shore crab Carcinus maenas, the common prawn Palaemon serratus, the common blenny or shanny Lipophrys pholis, the cushion starfish Asterina gibbosa and the hermit crab Pagurus bernhardus.
