= Devon Wildlife Trust =

Wildlife conservation charity

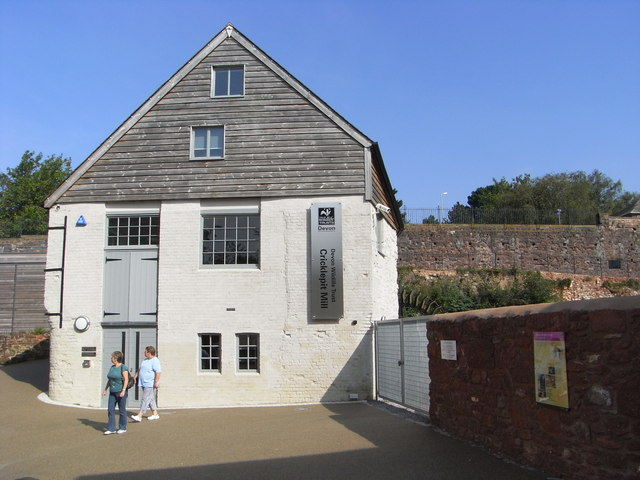
- Cricklepit Mill
- Predecessor: Devon Naturalists Trust
- Region served: Devon
- Website: www.devonwildlifetrust.org

The Devon Wildlife Trust is a member of The Wildlife Trusts partnership covering the county of Devon, England. It is a registered charity, established in 1961 as the Devon Naturalists Trust, and its aim is to safeguard the future of the county's urban, rural and marine wildlife and its environment.

== The trust ==
Twenty percent of Devon is unspoilt wildlife habitat, and the county contains all or part of two national parks (Dartmoor and Exmoor), one UNESCO biosphere reserve (North Devon Biosphere Reserve), five Areas of Outstanding Natural Beauty (Blackdown Hills, East Devon, North Devon Coast, South Devon and the Tamar Valley) and part of the Jurassic Coast, the only natural World Heritage Site in England. Devon Wildlife Trust campaigns on a number of regional and national wildlife issues, and also looks after some 58 nature reserves including Sites of Special Scientific Interest such as Bystock, Dawlish Warren, Bovey Heath, Chudleigh Knighton Heath, and Dunsford.

The trust has about 37,000 members which help fund its work and it is aided by around 300 volunteers which help with running local groups and habitat management work on the charity's nature reserves. There are also some 100 full-time staff working for the Trust.

The Trust's headquarters and visitor centre is located at the historic Cricklepit Mill in Exeter. The building features a working 19th-century water-powered flour mill and displays information about the Trust's reserves and activities. Outside is a wildlife garden, an oasis of calm in the middle of the city. The Trust's other visitor centre is Wembury Marine Centre on the coast in Wembury. The trust also manages Woodah Farm, near Doddiscombsleigh, which is situated in a wildlife reserve and provides groups with research facilities.

== Nature reserves ==
Devon Wildlife Trust manages the following nature reserves:

- Andrew's Wood
- Ash Moor
- Ashculm Turbary
- Barley Valley Park
- Bellever Moor and Meadows
- Blackadon
- Bovey Heathfield
- Bystock Pools
- Chudleigh Knighton Heath
- Clayhidon Turbary
- Dart Valley
- Dawlish Inner Warren
- Dunsdon
- Dunsford
- Duryard and Belvidere Valley Park
- Emsworthy Mire
- Exe Reed Beds
- Exeter Valley Parks
- Halsdon
- Halwill Junction
- Hawkwood
- Higher Kiln Quarry
- Horsey Island, Devon
- Ideford Common
- Lady's Wood
- Lickham Common
- Little Bradley Ponds
- Lower East Lounston
- Ludwell Valley Park
- Mambury Moor
- Marsland
- Meeth Quarry
- Meresfelle
- Meshaw Moor
- Mill Bottom
- Mincinglake Valley Park
- New England Wood
- Old Sludge Beds, Exe Estuary
- Rackenford and Knowstone Moors
- Riverside Valley Park
- Ruggadon Middlepark
- Scanniclift Copse
- Sourton Quarry
- South Efford Marsh
- Stapleton Mire
- Stowford Moor
- Swanpool Marsh
- Teigngrace Meadow
- The Rough
- Uppacott Wood
- Vealand Farm
- Veilstone Moore
- Venn Ottery
- Volehouse Moor
- Warleigh Point
- Whitycombe Valley Park
- Wolborough Fen
- Woodah Farm Rural Skills Centre

== Campaigns ==
Devon Wildlife Trust actively promotes and runs a number of campaigns. Devon is the only English county with two coastlines, and the Devon Wildlife Trust is joining with other wildlife trusts to campaign for better protection of marine life.

The Trust are responsible for watching over the UK's only breeding population of wild beavers. Present since at least 2008 in the River Otter, evidence of kits was found in 2014 and by 2019 there were believed to be eight families living on the river.
