= Dunsford Halt railway station =

Disused railway station in Devon, England

Dunsford Halt

General information
- Location: Christow, Teignbridge; England
- Coordinates: 50.6934°N 3.6452°W
- Grid reference: SX8389589487
- Platforms: 1

Other information
- Status: Disused

History
- Original company: Great Western Railway
- Post-grouping: Great Western Railway

Key dates
- 16 January 1928: Opened
- 9 June 1958: Closed to passengers
Location

Dunsford Halt was a railway station serving Dunsford, a small village in Devon, England, on the Teign Valley Line between the towns of Newton Abbot and Exeter.

== History ==
Situated some two miles from Dunsford village, the halt consisted of a single timber edged platform on the south side of the line 100 feet (30 m) in length and a typical basic flat roofed corrugated Great Western Railway iron shelter. It was replaced by a concrete platform after WW2. Dunsford was built some years after the stations on the line to compete against the new bus services.

Passenger numbers reached their peak in the 1930s with seven daily services provided each way between Exeter and Heathfield. During World War II this was reduced to four trains in each direction, still with no trains on a Sunday. This was increased to five daily trains after the war. The line was sometimes used as a diversionary route if the South Devon main line was unavailable.

== Later ==
The Teign Valley line may have a role to play in the future as an alternative to the Devon's main line route along the Dawlish coastline, which is vulnerable to stormy seas. The Council for the Protection of Rural England put together a feasibility study. Some of the old infrastructure is still in place: 6 miles (9.7 km) of the 21 miles (34 km) of track remained in 2009.

The Exeter and Teign Valley Railway has established a base in the old Christow railway station goods yard and plan to re-open the Teign Valley Line.

Preceding station	Disused railways	Following station
Christow	Heathfield to Exeter St Davids; Great Western Railway	Longdown
