= Chudleigh railway station =

Disused railway station in Devon, England

Coordinates: 50°35′42″N 3°36′55″W

Chudleigh

General information
- Location: Chudleigh, Teignbridge; England
- Grid reference: SX858784
- Platforms: 1

Other information
- Status: Disused

History
- Original company: Great Western Railway
- Pre-grouping: Great Western Railway
- Post-grouping: Great Western Railway

Key dates
- 9 October 1882: Opened
- 9 June 1958: Closed to passengers
- 4 December 1967: Closed to goods traffic.
Location

Chudleigh railway station was a railway station in Chudleigh, a small town in Devon, England located between the towns of Newton Abbot and Exeter.

The station opened on 9 October 1882 and was met with high expectations. It had one platform, which served the Teign Valley Line. There was a wooden building situated on the Chudleigh side of the line: the River Teign was on the other side. There was a goods siding next to the station. The station was host to a GWR camp coach in 1939. A camping coach was positioned here by the Western Region from 1956 to 1958.

The station was busy at peak hours, with commuters using it to travel to Exeter. Chudleigh town centre was over a mile away up the hill.

The station closed to passengers on 9 June 1958 when passenger trains were withdrawn from the Teign Valley Line, and goods facilities were withdrawn on 4 December 1967, although for the last two years only coal traffic was handled here. The station was later demolished and the A38 road took its place a few years later.

The Chudleigh Flood Platform was a wooden structure on higher ground on the line towards Trusham that was used when Chudleigh station was flooded, this being a regular seasonal occurrence.

The only trace of the station is when leaving Chudleigh towards Newton Abbot, the dual carriageway junction is called "Chudleigh Station". The bridge remains in place just after the river bridge.

Preceding station	Disused railways	Following station
Chudleigh Knighton Halt	Heathfield to Exeter St Davids; Great Western Railway	Trusham
