= Longdown railway station =

Disused railway station in Devon, England

Longdown

General information
- Location: Longdown, Teignbridge; England
- Coordinates: 50.7010°N 3.6223°W
- Grid reference: SX855903
- Platforms: 1

Other information
- Status: Disused

History
- Original company: Great Western Railway
- Pre-grouping: Great Western Railway
- Post-grouping: Great Western Railway

Key dates
- 1 July 1903: Opened
- 1 October 1923: Downgraded to a halt
- 9 June 1958: Closed to passengers
Location

Longdown was a railway station serving Longdown, a small village in Devon, England located on the Teign Valley Line between the towns of Newton Abbot and Exeter. Longdown is in the parish of Holcombe Burnell, south of the A30 road, about four miles (6.4 km) west of Exeter.

== History ==
Longdown station was situated around 1 mile (1.6 km) from the village and was located in an extensive woodland setting, situated between the 836-yard Perridge and the 248 yards (227 m) Culver Tunnels. in 1916 a five-lever signal box was built here. A looped siding which was used almost entirely for coal and timber for the Culver Estate until November 1956. Between 19 September 1943 and July 1954 an 1,100 feet (340 m) running loop was present, built to allow trains to pass when the main line from Newton Abbot to Exeter was blocked. The up line was signaled for reversible running.

Passenger numbers reached their peak in the 1930s with seven daily services provided each way between Exeter and Heathfield. During World War 2 this was reduced to four trains in each direction, still with no trains on a Sunday. This was increased to five daily trains after the war. As stated, the line was sometimes used as a diversionary route if the South Devon main line was unavailable.

When the station closed it was offered up for sale to the descendants of the original landowners as per the conditions of the original sale.

=== The present day ===
The Teign Valley line may have a role to play in the future, as an alternative to the Devon's main line route along the Dawlish coastline which is vulnerable to stormy seas. The Council for the Protection of Rural England (CPRE) put together a feasibility study. Some of the old infrastructure is still in place – 6 miles (9.7 km) of the 21 miles (34 km) of track remained in 2009.

The Exeter and Teign Valley Railway has established a base in the old Christow railway station goods yard and plan to re-open the Teign Valley Line.

Preceding station	Disused railways	Following station
Dunsford Halt	Heathfield to Exeter St Davids; Great Western Railway	Ide Halt
