= Chudleigh Flood Platform railway station =

Disused railway station in Devon, England

Chudleigh Flood Platform

General information
- Location: Chudleigh, Teignbridge; England
- Grid reference: SX857785
- Platforms: 1

Other information
- Status: Disused

History
- Original company: Great Western Railway
- Pre-grouping: Great Western Railway
- Post-grouping: Great Western Railway

Key dates
- 1920: Opened
- 9 June 1958: Closed to passengers

Chudleigh Flood Platform railway station was a railway station near Chudleigh, a small town in South Devon, England located between Newton Abbot and Exeter. Opened in 1920, it saw only occasional use each year as it was constructed as an alternative station for use when Chudleigh was flooded by the River Teign, this being a recurring seasonal problem.

== History ==
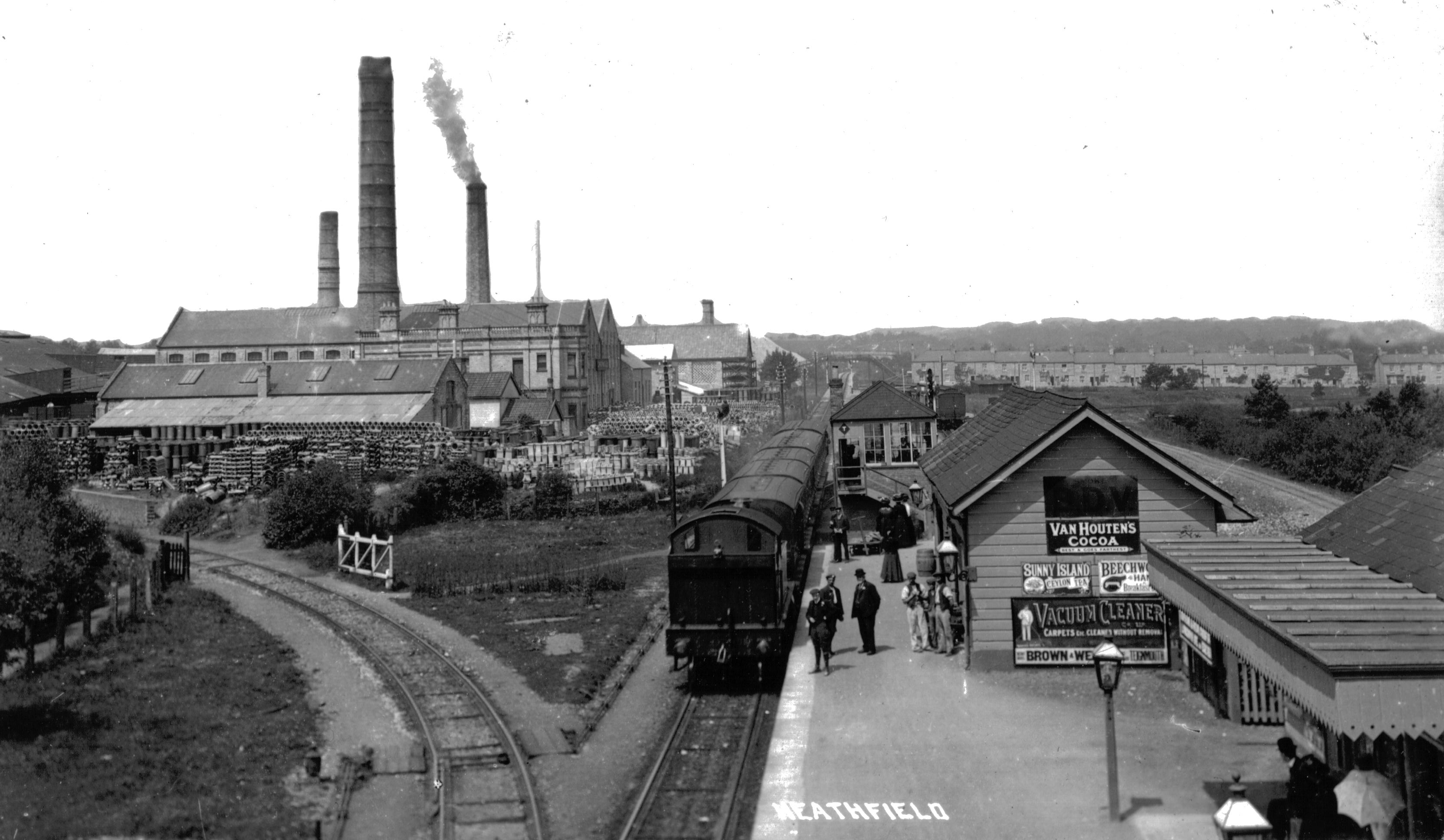
Heathfield, junction for the Teign Valley line.

The station was built on higher ground, circa 100 yards (91 m) from Chudleigh railway station on the line towards Trusham railway station. This very unusual station had a short wooden platform, long enough for one door on a carriage. It was on the north side of the single track line and was connected to nearby Pottery Lane by a raised wooden gangway with white painted hand rails. Passengers unable to alight at Chudleigh railway station were able to disembark and walk to the lane where a bus would take them to Heathfield railway station so that they could continue their rail journey. Passengers were also able to board the train here.

Film of the Teign Valley line dating from 1958 shows the Chudleigh Flood Platform station still present with the hand rails painted white.

The station was closed by British Railways (Western Region) to passengers on 9 June 1958 when passenger trains were withdrawn from the Teign Valley Line.

== Operation ==
It was the responsibility of the Chudleigh stationmaster to contact the Engineering Department, as well as the persons in charge at Heathfield and Trusham and the Exeter stationmaster as soon as flooding took place at Chudleigh. In later years the porter-in-charge was responsible for making the necessary arrangements. Trains from Exeter terminated at the short platform and passengers, as previously stated, were transferred to Heathfield Station by bus. In Great Western Railway days an ongoing arrangement with the Devon General Omnibus Company was in place to transport the passengers.

Preceding station	Disused railways	Following station
Chudleigh	Heathfield to Exeter St Davids; Great Western Railway	Trusham
