= Ide Halt railway station =

Disused railway station in Devon, England

Ide Halt

General information
- Location: Ide, Devon, Teignbridge; England
- Coordinates: 50.7012°N 3.5624°W
- Grid reference: SX8975590233
- Platforms: 1

Other information
- Status: Disused

History
- Original company: Great Western Railway
- Pre-grouping: Great Western Railway
- Post-grouping: Great Western Railway

Key dates
- 1 July 1903: Opened as Ide
- 1 January 1917: Closed
- 1 May 1919: Re-opened
- June 1928: Renamed Ide Halt.
- 7 May 1955: Closed to goods
- 9 June 1958: Closed to passengers
Location

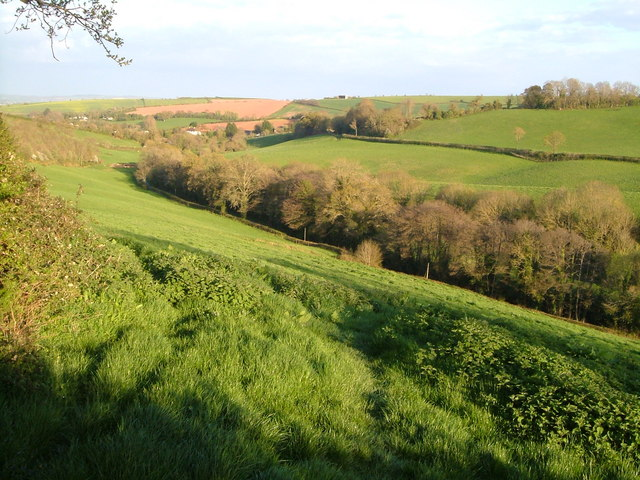
Site of the old railway near Ide.

Ide Halt was a railway station serving Ide, a small village in Devon, England located on the Teign Valley Line between Newton Abbot and Exeter.

== History ==
Ide Halt was located close to the centre of the village. The single concrete platform had a brick station building and was situated on the north side of the line with a loading dock which was located at the west end. The track was single with a passing loop and siding located towards Longdown. Opened in 1903, the station was closed between 1917 and 1919 as a WW1 economy measure. Ide became a basic halt on 1 October 1923 when staffing was reduced to mornings only. It appeared on tickets and in timetables as a halt, however Ide didn't appear in the Railway Clearing House handbook as a halt until 1938. Between 1935 - 1939 a camp coach was located here.

Passenger numbers had reached their peak in the 1930s with seven daily services provided each way between Exeter and Heathfield. During World War 2 this was reduced to four trains in each direction, still with no trains on a Sunday. This was increased to five daily trains after the war. The line was sometimes used as a diversionary route if the South Devon main line was unavailable. Freight services were withdrawn from 7 May 1955 and at the same date the station became unstaffed. The siding was lifted later that year. Passenger services were withdrawn in 1958, preceding the Beeching cuts by five years.

=== The present day ===
A small housing scheme now occupies the site of the station and the trackbed is a road, St. Ida's Close.

The Teign Valley line may have a role to play in the future, as an alternative to Devon's main line route along the Dawlish coastline which is vulnerable to stormy seas. The Campaign to Protect Rural England (CPRE) put together a feasibility study. Some of the old infrastructure is still in place - 6 miles (9.7 km) of the 21 miles (34 km) of track remained in 2009.

The Exeter and Teign Valley Railway has established a base in the old Christow railway station goods yard and plan to re-open the Teign Valley Line.

Preceding station	Disused railways	Following station
Longdown	Heathfield to Exeter St Davids; Great Western Railway	Alphington Halt
