= Trusham =

Village in Devon, United Kingdom

Coordinates: 50°38′N 3°37′W

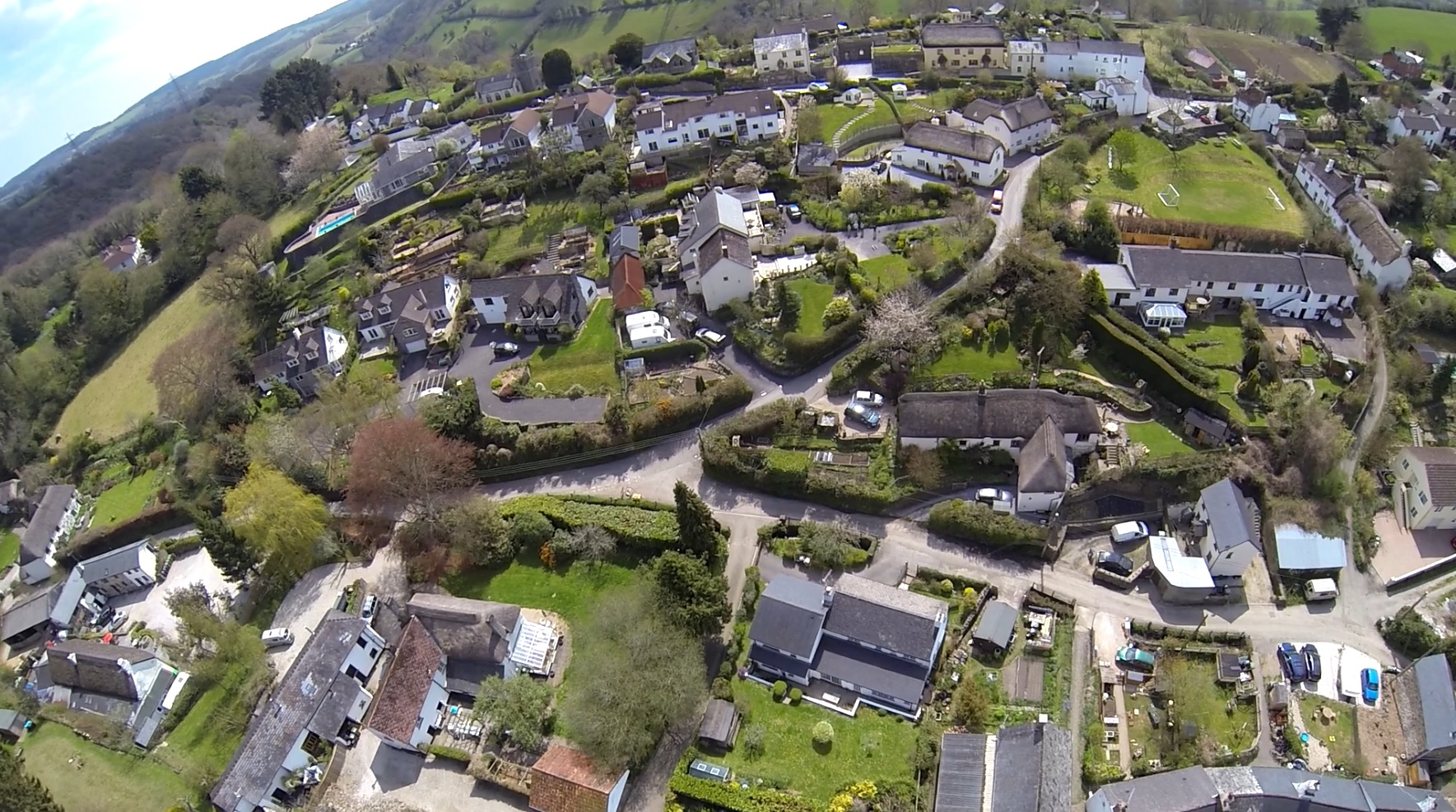
- Aerial view of Trusham

- Location within Devon
- Population: 209 (2021 census)
- OS grid reference: SX 85435 82117
- Civil parish: Trusham
- District: Teignbridge
- Shire county: Devon
- Region: South West
- Country: England
- Sovereign state: United Kingdom
- Post town: NEWTON ABBOT
- Postcode district: TQ13
- Police: Devon and Cornwall
- Fire: Devon and Somerset
- Ambulance: South Western
- UK Parliament: Central Devon

Trusham is a small village and civil parish in the Teign Valley, between Newton Abbot and Exeter, in the Teignbridge district, in the county of Devon, England. The settlement was first recorded in the Domesday Book of 1086 as Trisma, which is hypothesised to be a compound of the south-western Brythonic words trev and isam meaning lower homestead. It was recorded as Trusham al. Trisme in the Recovery Rolls of 1630, with sources after this referring to it as Trusham only. In 2021 it had a population of 209.

A pub, the Cridford Inn, was opened in 1985 by converting part of an old farmhouse and adjoining barn. (Note: It was quoted in "The Which Guide to Country Pubs" dated March 1988 that the main site of the now, Cridford Inn, dates back to 825. The building was presumably remodelled in 1081, as a small cobbled area in which was set a crude mosaic, made of dolerite and quartz, bearing the initials HJ; the year 1081 was discovered during renovations in 1988. This mosaic is preserved and displayed under glass in the inn's restaurant. The Cridford had also previously served as a nunnery and a farm. It is understood to be one of the nine small-holdings mentioned in the Domesday Book in 1086, and by then belonged to the Abbey of Buckfast in the Manor of Trusham. During the early 13th to 15th centuries, the building was a farmhouse. The stained glass mullion window in the bar is from this period and is possibly the earliest surviving example of a Medieval domestic window in England. The Cridford Inn is purportedly haunted by two ghosts. One is said to be a nun from the very early history of the property and a second is a Cavalier from Trusham's conflict with Ashton, a nearby village, in the Civil war of 1642-46.) The Church of St Michael is an ancient stone building in the early English and Perpendicular styles with traces of Norman work. The church was thoroughly restored in 1865, when the stained east window and a smaller one were inserted as memorials to the Rev. William Edward Brendon, who died in 1864. There is also a memorial to John Stooke which mentions a charity he set up for the church and the poor of nearby Bovey Tracey. (Note: The story, first recorded in 1709, goes that in 1646 an officer in the Royalist army was gambling at Bovey when he was cornered by Roundheads. Before he was slain, he threw his bag of winnings to a servant, who (before he was also slain) threw them over a hedge, where they were found by Stooke, then a farmer's son. Stooke's fortune was founded on his lucky find. Bovey's altar fund still receives a small annual sum from the charity.)

Trusham was the ancestral home of the Causley family, whose descendants include the poet Charles Causley and the folk singer Jim Causley. Causley's poem "Trusham" is an account of a return he made to the village in his later years; a reflection on one's family roots, what it is to be distant from those, and the legacies we leave behind us. Jim Causley's setting of this poem—amongst a number of other poems by his distant relation—is a modern song-setting, and is available on the album Cyprus Well. A later poem, "The Prodigal Son", recounts a further visit by Causley to his ancestral village, linking once again the local geography, history and landscape with the First World War and his own family memories. In 2007, Trusham held the first Charles Causley Festival in conjunction with the Charles Causley Society of Launceston. There is a plaque in the village to celebrate Causley's life and the Charles Causley Society hold regular events in Trusham such as Causley readings and poems set to music, hog roasts and barn dancing.

The now disused and privately owned Trusham railway station was part of the Teign Valley Line. Although the school closed in November 1948, its Victorian building is now the Village Hall.

The Domesday survey of 1086 recorded a settlement of 23 households (four of villagers, nine of smallholders, ten of slaves). Eight hundred years later, the 1881 Census recorded a very small growth, with 41 households and a population of 177; however, in Kelly’s 1901 Directory of Devonshire, the population had fallen to 165. By 2001, whilst the number of households had increased to 60, the population had fallen further to 144.

Trusham is on the western side of the 250 m (820 ft) high Haldon Hills, roughly 90 m (300 ft) above the river Teign, which forms the Dartmoor National Park boundary and is just over half a mile away. The village is accessed via minor roads which are predominantly single track with passing places. The A38 passes within 2 mi (3.2 km) at Chudleigh. The centre of the village has the O S grid reference SX 854 821 and for sat nav users the postcode is TQ13 0NW.
