= Ide, Devon =

Village in Devon, England

Coordinates: 50°42′14″N 3°33′33″W

Ide
- Village
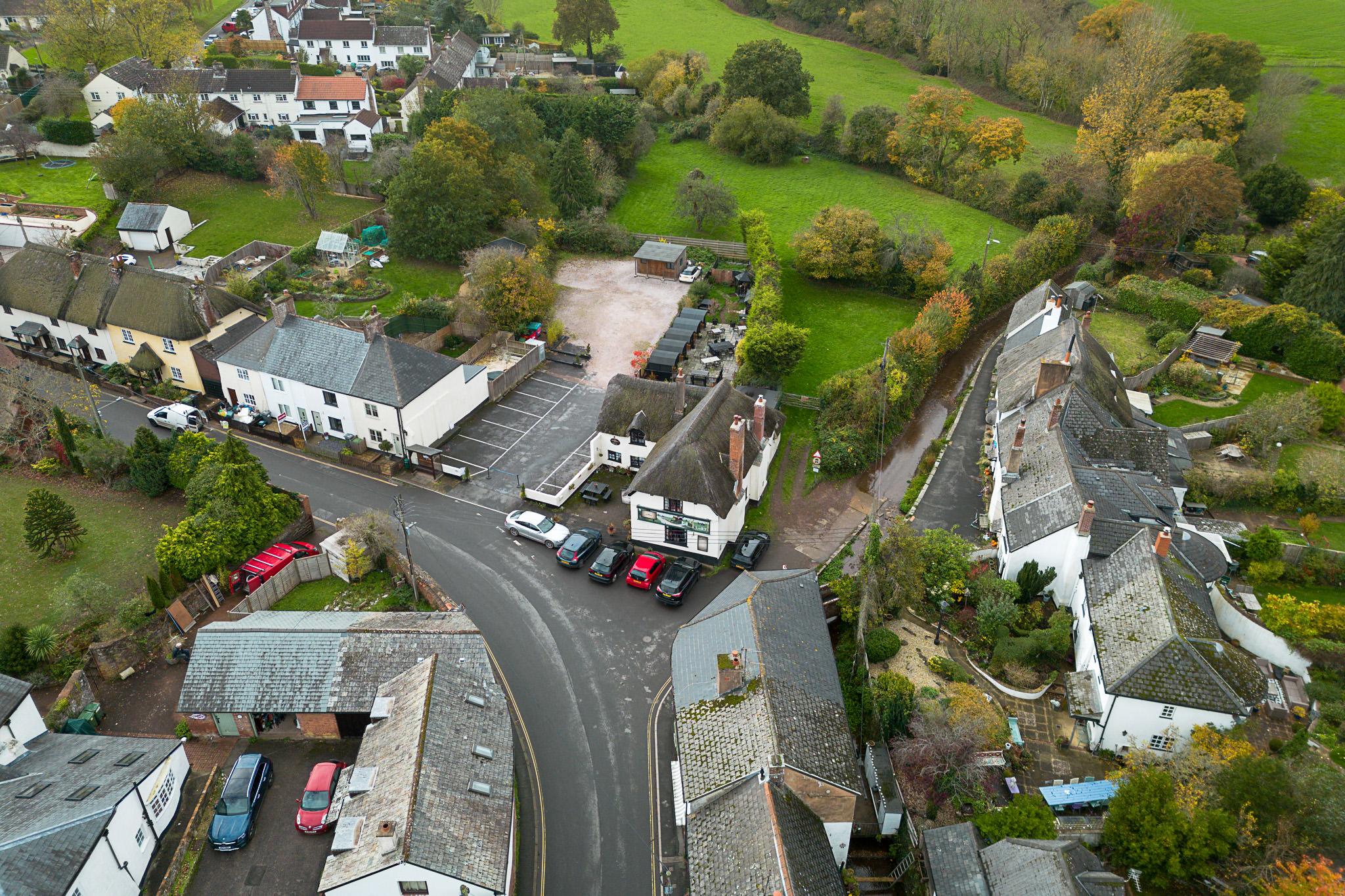
- Ide village, aerial view from The College

- Location within the United Kingdom
- Population: 586
- Civil parish: Ide
- District: Teignbridge
- Shire county: Devon
- Country: England
- Sovereign state: United Kingdom
- Post town: Exeter
- Postcode district: EX

Ide /ˈiːd/ is a village in Devon, England, just under 1 mile (1.6 kilometres) southwest of Exeter. The village church is dedicated to the German Saint Ida of Herzfeld and was rebuilt in 1834.

The majority of the village is separated from suburban Exeter by the A30 dual carriageway. Whilst it was controversial at the time of construction, the bypass has effectively enabled Ide to maintain an independent identity. The parish boundaries extend a short distance over the A30 and several notable buildings within the parish, including Ide House and the Twisted Oak pub, are located on the Exeter side.

The village has two pubs: the Poacher's Inn and the Huntsman Inn. To the northwest of the village at College Lane, a ford crosses the Fordland Brook.

Above Ide on a hilltop at SX8888 is the site of a Roman fortlet or signal station.

Ide Halt railway station on the G.W.R. Teign Valley Line opened in 1903 and closed to passengers on 9 June 1958. The station site was re-developed as St Ida's Close.

Ide had a population of 526 in 2011, which decreased to 510 in 2014, and increased to 586 in 2021.
