= Ashton railway station =

Disused railway station in Devon, England

Coordinates: 50.64484°N 3.63555°W

Ashton
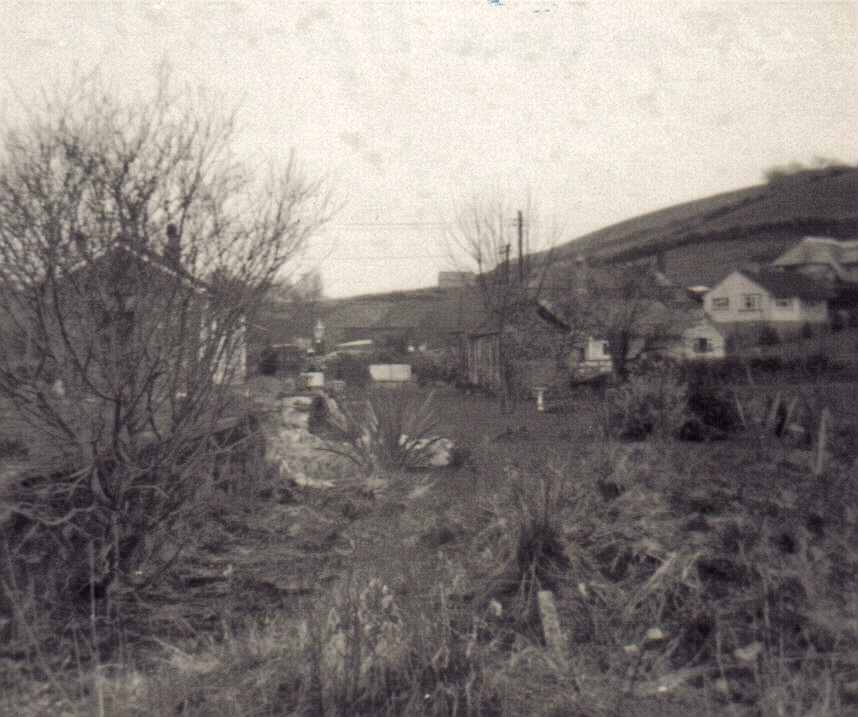
- Remnants of Ashton station in 1970

General information
- Location: Lower Ashton, Teignbridge; England
- Platforms: 1

Other information
- Status: Disused

History
- Original company: Teign Valley Railway
- Pre-grouping: Great Western Railway
- Post-grouping: Great Western Railway

Key dates
- 9 October 1882: Station opens
- 9 June 1958: Station closed
Location

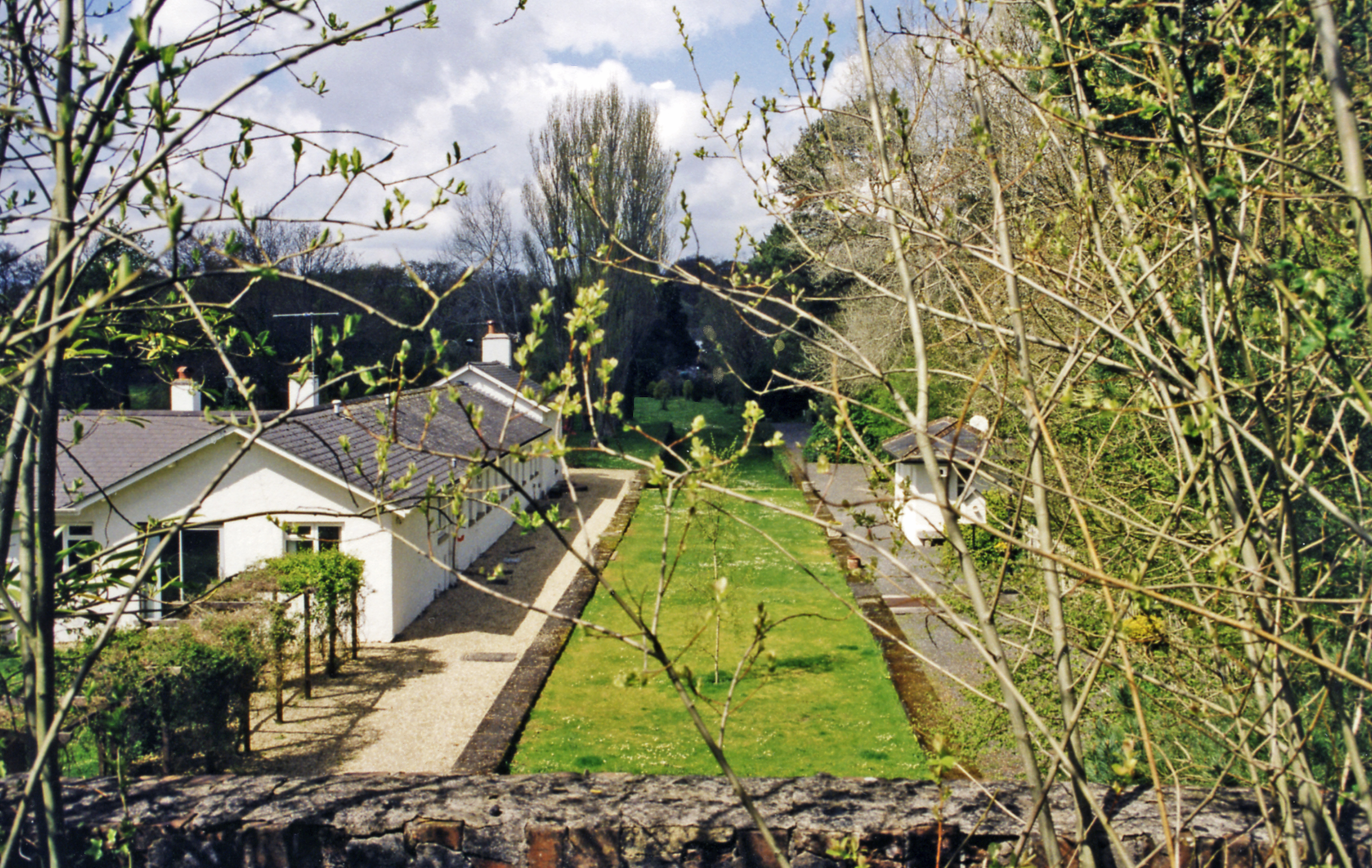
The station in 2000

Ashton railway station was a railway station serving the village of Ashton in Devon, England. It was located on the Teign Valley line.

== History ==
The station was opened on 9 October 1882 as the northern terminus of the Teign Valley Railway when it opened from Heathfield junction on the Moretonhampstead and South Devon Railway. It became a through station when the line was extended to Christow in 1883.

The station had a timber platform and a raised causeway for access when the Teign flooded. An engine shed and signal box were located to the south of the station and the goods yard was equipped with a 2-ton crane.

The station was host to a GWR camp coach from 1934 to 1939. A camping coach was also positioned here by the Western Region in 1952.

The station closed on 9 June 1958.

== The site today ==
The former station is now a private house. Part of the goods yard crane remains in an adjacent farmyard.

| Preceding station | Disused railways | Following station |
|---|---|---|
| Christow | Great Western Railway; Teign Valley Line | Trusham |

== Bibliography ==
- Awdry, Christopher (1990). Encyclopaedia of British Railway Companies. Sparkford: Patrick Stephens Ltd. ISBN 1-8526-0049-7. OCLC 19514063. CN 8983.
- Grant, Donald J. (2017). Directory of the Railway Companies of Great Britain (1st ed.). Kibworth Beauchamp, Leicestershire: Troubador Publishing Ltd. ISBN 978-1-78803-768-6.
- McRae, Andrew (1997). British Railway Camping Coach Holidays: The 1930s & British Railways (London Midland Region). Vol. Scenes from the Past: 30 (Part One). Foxline. ISBN 1-870119-48-7.
- McRae, Andrew (1998). British Railways Camping Coach Holidays: A Tour of Britain in the 1950s and 1960s. Vol. Scenes from the Past: 30 (Part Two). Foxline. ISBN 1-870119-53-3.
- Quick, Michael (2022) [2001]. Railway passenger stations in Great Britain: a chronology (PDF). version 5.04. Railway & Canal Historical Society. Archived from the original (PDF) on 25 November 2022.
- The Railway Clearing House (1970) [1904]. The Railway Clearing House Handbook of Railway Stations 1904 (1970 D&C Reprint ed.). Newton Abbot: David & Charles Reprints. p. 461. ISBN 0-7153-5120-6.
