= Chudleigh Knighton =

Village in Devon, England

Coordinates: 50.585°N 3.631°W

- Chudleigh Knighton Halt, 1969

- Location within Devon
- Area: 0.255 km^{2} (0.098 sq mi)
- Population: 1,155 (2017 Census)
  - Density: 4,529/km^{2} (11,730/sq mi)
- OS grid reference: SX844770
- Civil parish: Hennock
- District: Teignbridge
- Shire county: Devon
- Region: South West
- Country: England
- Sovereign state: United Kingdom
- Post town: NEWTON ABBOT
- Postcode district: TQ13
- Dialling code: 01626
- Police: Devon and Cornwall
- Fire: Devon and Somerset
- Ambulance: South Western
- UK Parliament: Central Devon

Chudleigh Knighton is a small village in Devon, England, near to Newton Abbot and Bovey Tracey.

== Amenities ==
Chudleigh Knighton Church of England Primary School has around 167 pupils, aged 5 to 11. The school has six classrooms on two floors.

There is a village hall, a hairdressers, and a public house, The Claycutter's Arms. A second public house, The Anchor, burned down in March 2015. A fair is held in early July.

== Transport ==
Chudleigh Knighton is served by bus services from Newton Abbot and Exeter. The village used to have a railway station, Chudleigh Knighton Halt, on the Teign Valley Line. The station opened on 9 June 1924 and closed on 9 June 1958.

== Chudleigh Knighton Heath ==
The nearby Chudleigh Knighton Heath, a Site of Special Scientific Interest, is a habitat for many rare species including the ant, Formica exsecta. The Heath was once the village's main football pitch and was the venue for many sports days for the primary school. The Heath became so run down it was almost impossible to navigate, so the school opened its own private sports field opposite the village play park.
