= Christow =

Village in Devon, England

Coordinates: 50.6533°N 3.6478°W

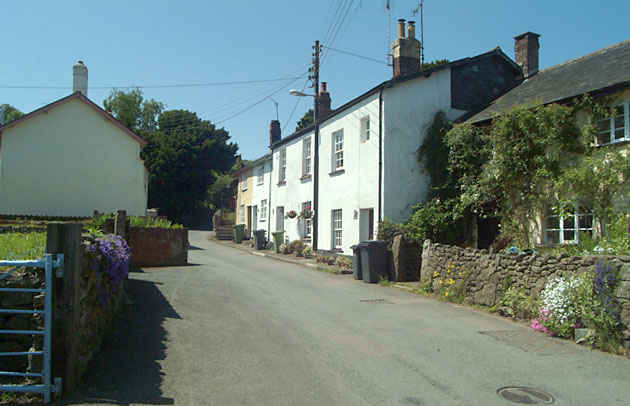
- Cottages in the village of Christow

- Location within Devon
- OS grid reference: SX8385
- Civil parish: Christow
- District: Teignbridge
- Shire county: Devon
- Region: South West
- Country: England
- Sovereign state: United Kingdom
- Post town: EXETER
- Postcode district: EX6
- Dialling code: 01647
- Police: Devon and Cornwall
- Fire: Devon and Somerset
- Ambulance: South Western
- Website: Christow Parish Council

Christow is a village and civil parish in the Teignbridge district of Devon, England. It is located 12 miles (19 km) south-west of Exeter, in the Teign Valley, just off the B3193 road that links Chudleigh and Dunsford. Christow is on the eastern edge of Dartmoor National Park. According to the 2021 UK Census, the population of Christow Parish was recorded as 900 people.

== Manor ==
The parish includes the tything of Canonteign, where there are two notable historic houses. Canonteign Barton is a late Tudor stone house and a Grade I listed building. Canonteign House is a neo-classical building completed for Captain Pownoll Pellew, who in the last year of his life succeeded his father as Viscount Exmouth.

== Parish church ==
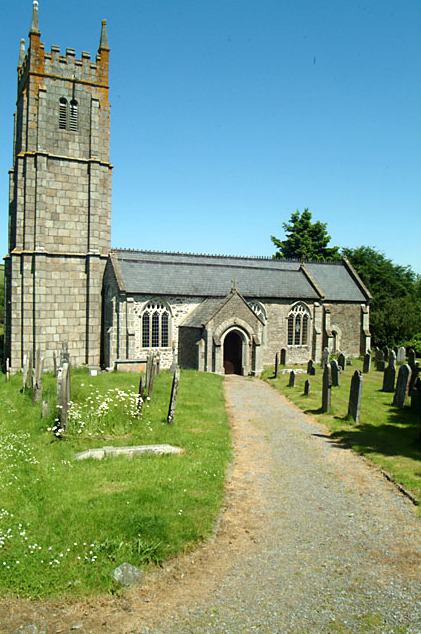
Parish church of St James the Apostle

Christow's Church of England parish church of St James the Apostle has a 12th-century Norman baptismal font, but otherwise seems to be largely a 15th-century building.

The west tower is a Gothic Survival addition of 1630 and has a ring of eight bells. John III and Christopher IV Pennington of Stoke Climsland, Cornwall cast a ring of six bells for the tower in 1785. John Taylor & Co of Loughborough, Leicestershire added a new treble and second bell in 1973, increasing the ring to eight.

Inside the church are monuments including two to Admiral Edward Pellew, 1st Viscount Exmouth and his son the 2nd Viscount, both of whom died in 1833. The church was restored in 1862 to designs by the architect Edward Ashworth. It is a Grade I listed building.

== Railway ==
The Teign Valley Railway was built from Heathfield to Christow in 1882, but Christow railway station was not opened until 1903 when the line was extended to Exeter. The line was closed to passenger trains in 1958 and freight in 1961.

== Notable former residents ==
As well as the Viscounts Exmouth, Christow was the home of Lady daughter of the 1st Viscount. She was the wife of Admiral Sir Lawrence Halsted, died in 1835 and is buried at Christow. Arthur Marshall (1910–89) lived in Christow in later life, and fictionalised the village as "Appleton". The adventurers The Turner Twins (born 1988) grew up in Christow parish.

== Amenities ==
Christow has a pub, the Artichoke Inn, that was built in or before the 17th century. The village also a community primary school and a Community Hall with tennis courts and a skate park. There is also a GPs' practice and Gidley's Meadow, a small industrial estate. On the 5th of November 2024, a local shop, named the Christow Community Shop, was opened. It sells essential goods and local produce.
