= Teigngrace Halt railway station =

Disused railway station in Devon, England

Coordinates: 50.5563°N 3.6257°W

Teigngrace Halt
- The old station buildings in 1975

General information
- Location: Teigngrace, Teignbridge; England
- Grid reference: SX8493674220
- Platforms: 1

Other information
- Status: Disused

History
- Post-grouping: Great Western Railway

Key dates
- December 1867: Opened as Teigngrace
- 1 January 1917: Closed
- 1 May 1919: Reopened
- 8 May 1939: Renamed Teigngrace Halt
- 2 March 1959: Closed to passengers
Location

Teigngrace Halt was a railway station opened as Teigngrace in 1867 by the Moretonhampstead and South Devon Railway.

== History ==
The station was renamed Teigngrace Halt by the Great Western Railway (GWR) in 1939. It had a single platform, with a ticket office and waiting room, with sidings and a passing loop - now lifted. In around 1961 the South Devon Railway Society leased Teigngrace Halt as their headquarters and carried out some repairs and renovation works.

The platform was still in situ, as was the ruined station building in 1975. The old Stover Canal runs parallel to the line at this point and locks were located nearby.

=== Freight traffic ===
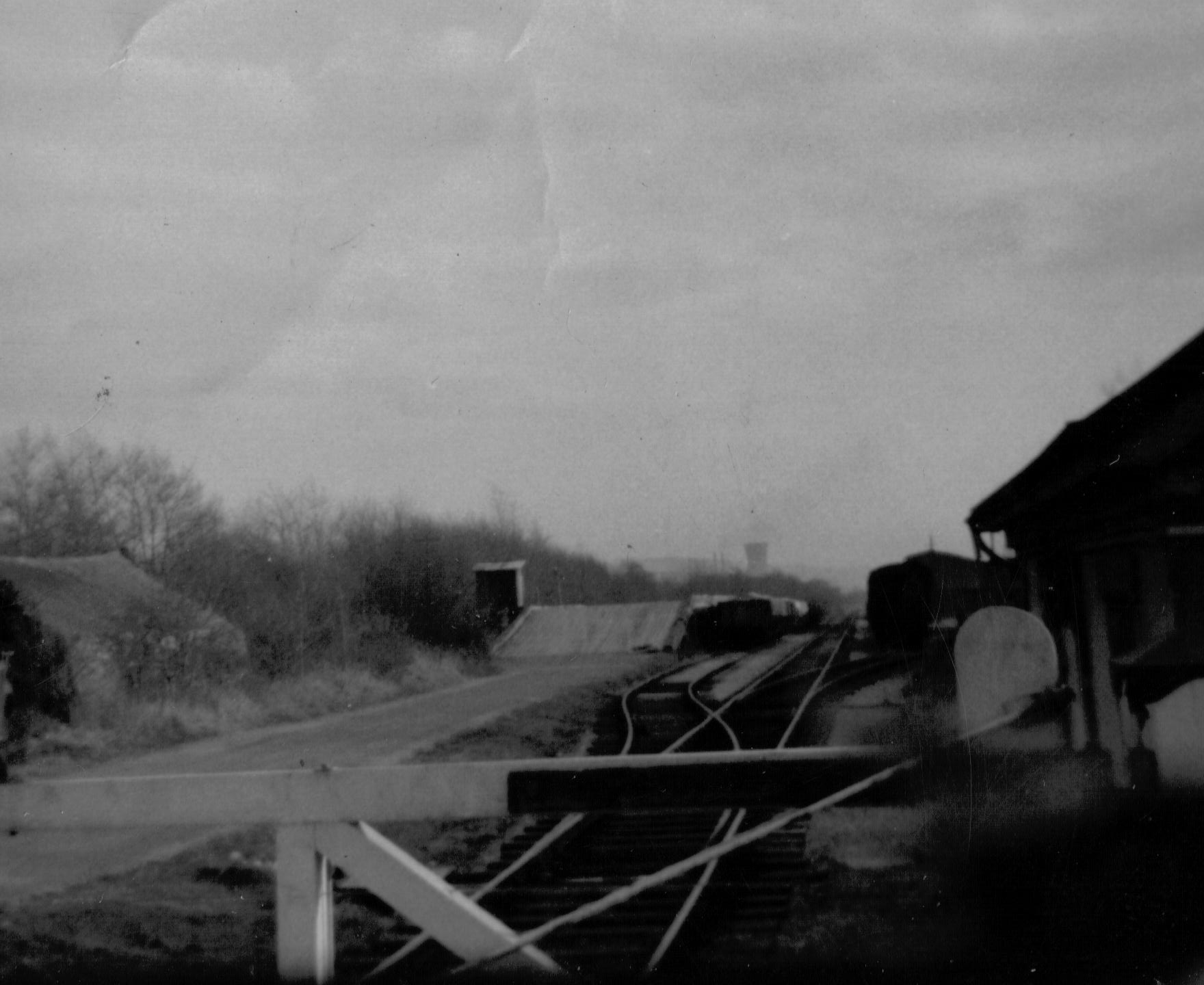
The ball clay loading dock and sidings in 1969.

The nearby sidings and loading dock lie on the other side of the level crossing and were used for many years for ball clay traffic, however this eventually ceased and in 2009 the line was mothballed until December 2011 when it was announced that the section of the line to Heathfield would re-opened to facilitate the transport of timber from Heathfield to Chirk in North Wales by Colas Rail. In the same month a timber siding was opened at Teigngrace, just before the level crossing at Exeter Road, to allow the timber to be loaded onto the freight trains. Teigngrace lacks a passing loop and trains with empty wagons continue up the line to Heathfield to permit locomotives to run around the waggons using the loop in the disused station. The empty freight train then ran back to the timber sidings at Teigngrace to be loaded. Loading of the timber is carried out by the lorries that bring the timber to the sidings. The timber contract ended in late 2015 and the line was mothballed in 2016.

== Enthusiast excursions ==
Teigngrace Halt with a special train in 1970

In 1960 the South Devon Railway Society ran a special six coach train The Heart of Devon Rambler from Paignton to Moretonhampstead and repeated the exercise the following year with a special via Teigngrace to the Teign Valley Line. In 1962 a final special excursion train was run by the society to Moretonhampstead.

| Preceding station | Disused railways | Following station |
|---|---|---|
| Newton Abbot | Newton Abbot to Moretonhampstead; Great Western Railway | Heathfield |
