= Longdown =

Village in Exeter, Devon, England

Coordinates: 50°42′N 3°37′W

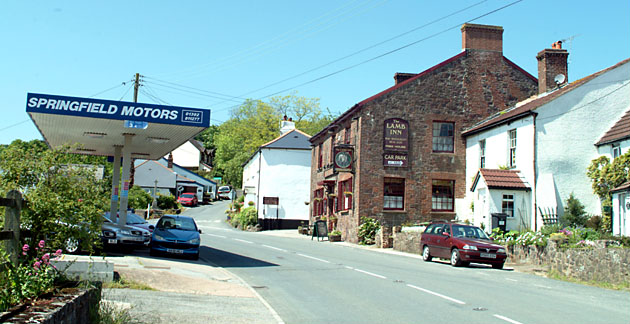
Longdown village centre

Longdown is a small village in the parish of Holcombe Burnell, south of the A30 road, about four miles west of Exeter in Devon, England. It has a public house called The Lamb Inn.

About half a mile south of the village is the 836 yard long Perridge Tunnel, through which the Teign Valley Railway Line ran until it closed in 1958. The tunnel is now blocked by a collapse, but the nearby Longdown railway station was reported as being in good condition in 2006.
