= Alphington Halt railway station =

Disused railway station in Devon, England

Coordinates: 50.70373°N 3.53790°W

Alphington Halt
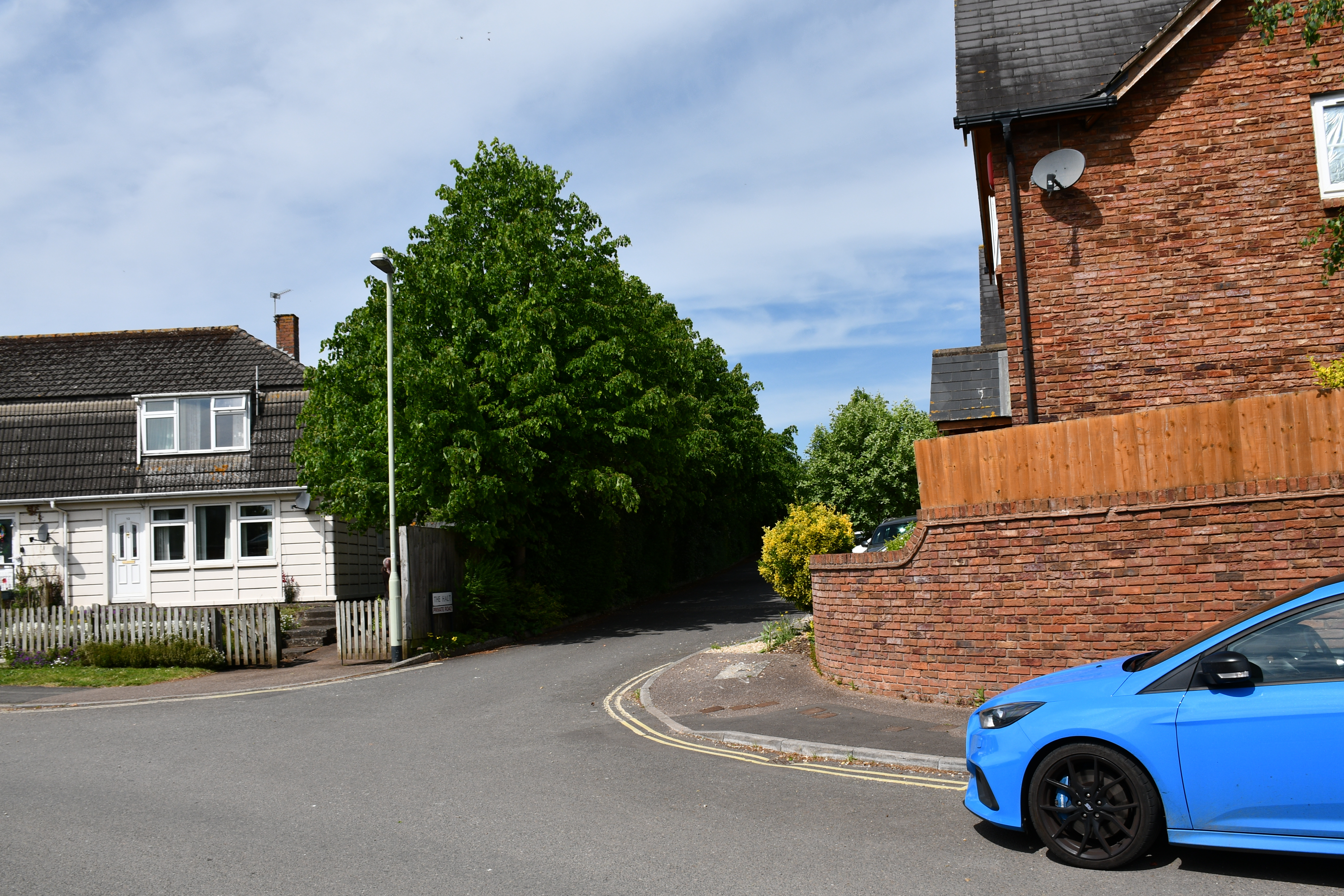
- Area around Alphington Halt railway station

General information
- Location: Alphington, Exeter; England
- Line: Teign Valley Line
- Platforms: 1

Other information
- Status: Disused

History
- Original company: Great Western Railway
- Post-grouping: Great Western Railway

Key dates
- 2 April 1928: Station opens
- 9 June 1958: Station closes
Location

Alphington Halt railway station was a small station serving the village of Alphington (now a suburb of Exeter) located on the Teign Valley Line, which opened in 1882 and closed in 1961. This diverged from the South Devon Main Line at Exeter and joined the Netwon Abbot to Moretonhampstead line at Heathfield.

== History ==
Alphington Halt had a 100-foot (30 m) long wooden platform with a flat roofed corrugated shelter located on the eastern side of the single track line with no sidings or passing loop.

Opened by the Great Western Railway in 1928, the station then passed on to the Western Region of British Railways on nationalisation in 1948.

The station was then closed in June 1958 by the British Transport Commission.

Preceding station	Historical railways	Following station
Exeter St Thomas	Great Western Railway; Teign Valley Line	Ide Halt
