= Christow railway station =

Disused railway station in Devon, England

Christow Station
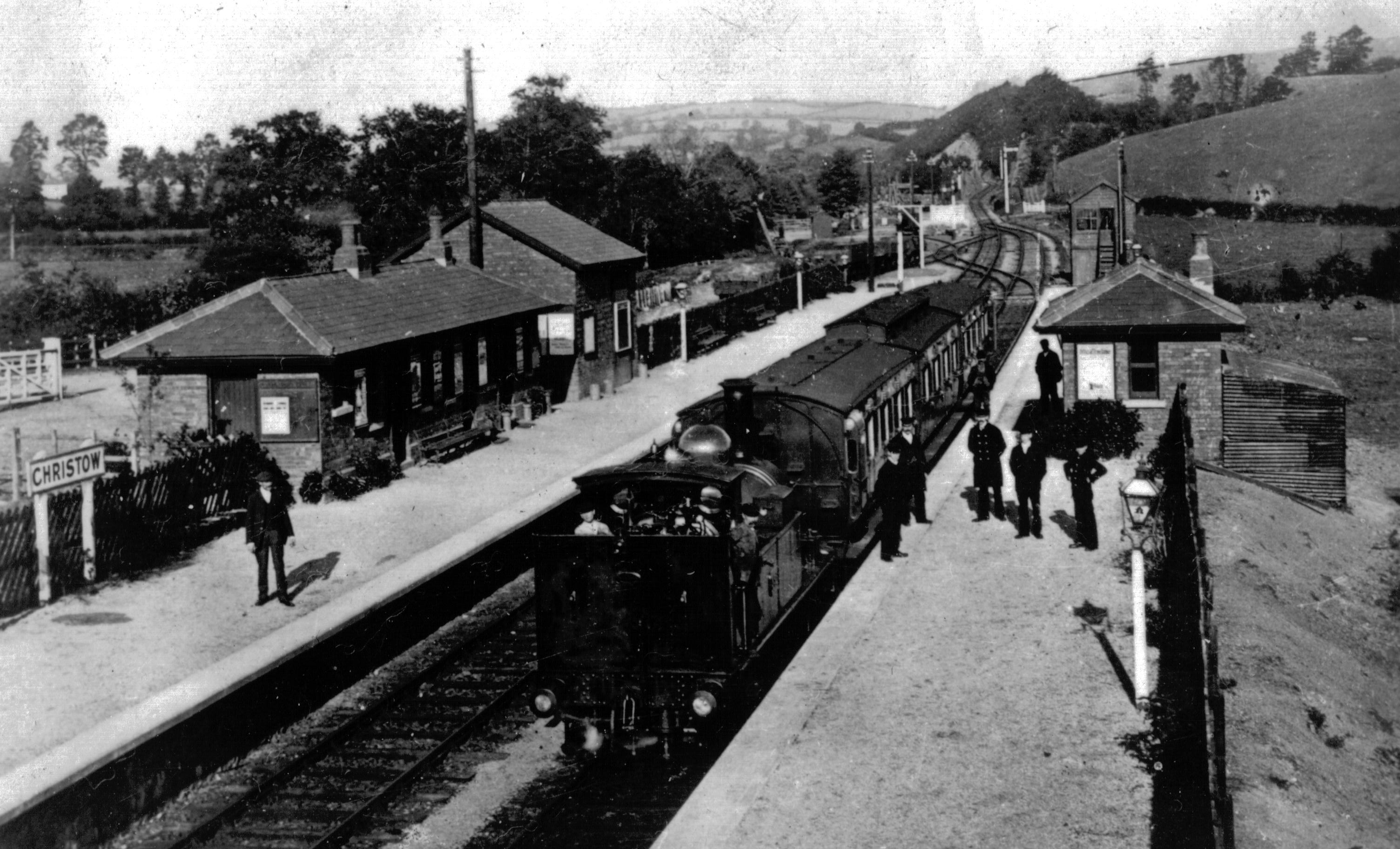
- Christow station in 1904

General information
- Location: Christow, Teignbridge; England
- Coordinates: 50.6669°N 3.6429°W
- Grid reference: SX8398686542
- Platforms: 2

Other information
- Status: Disused

History
- Original company: Great Western Railway
- Pre-grouping: Great Western Railway
- Post-grouping: Great Western Railway

Key dates
- 1 July 1903: Opened
- 9 June 1958: Closed to passengers
- 1 May 1961: Closed to goods traffic
- 1963: Track lifted
Location

Christow railway station, previously known as Teign House, served the villages of Christow, Bridford and Doddiscombsleigh in Devon, England. It was a stop on the Teign Valley line between Newton Abbot and Exeter St Thomas. The station was located in the parish of Doddiscombsleigh, as the parish boundary is the River Teign.

== History ==
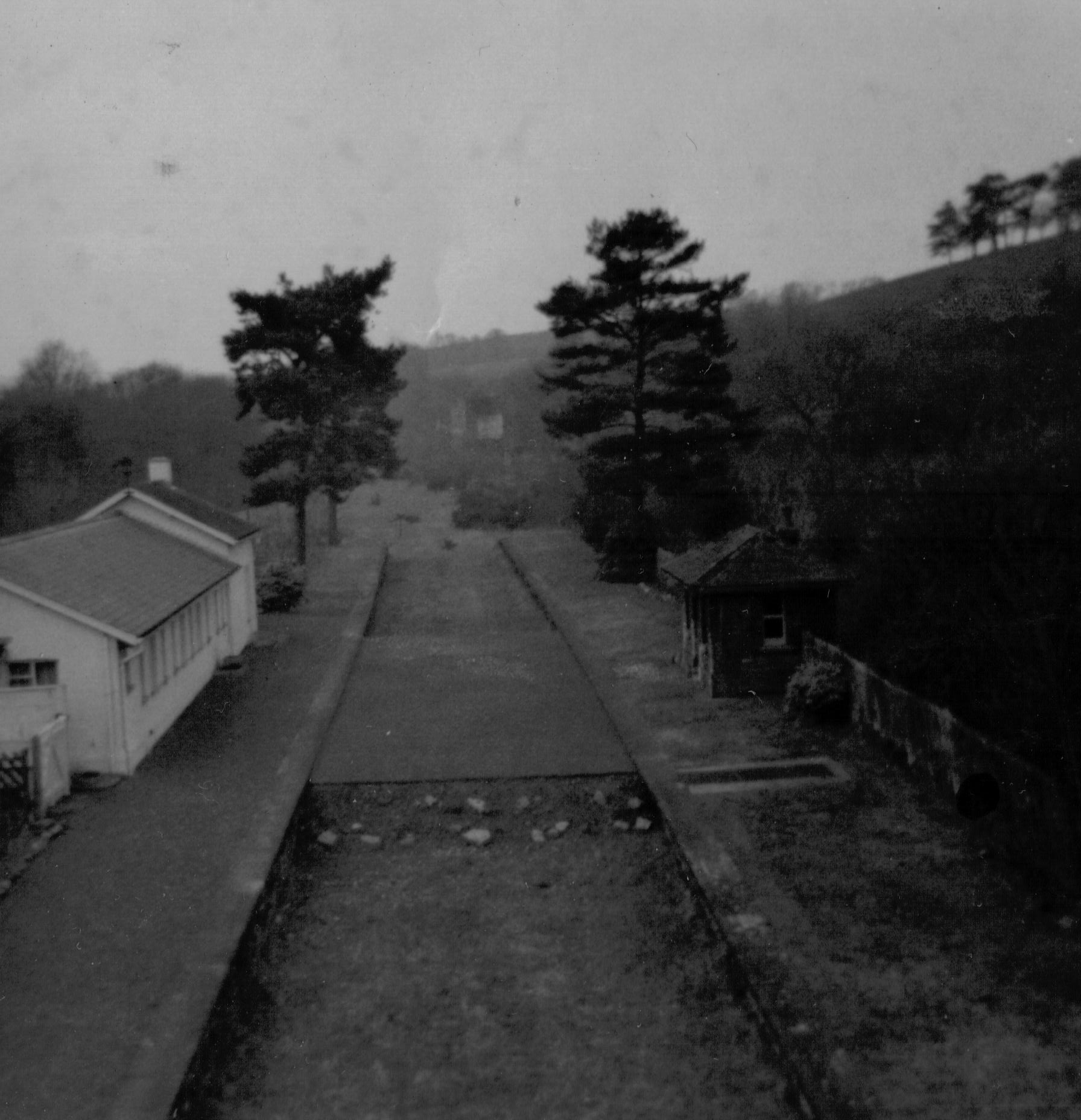
Christow station in 1969

Until 1943, Christow was the only passing place on the Teign Valley Line. The red brick station building was on the up platform. The down platform had a waiting shelter and a raised timber built signal box at the far end of the platform. Originally, Christow was the terminus of the line from Heathfield and was called Teign House at that time. An extension, known as Teign House Siding, existed for loading stone.

The down loop was extended northwards by 370 yards (340 m) in 1943, as part of the upgrading of the route for trains diverted from the South Devon Main Line.

Passenger numbers reached their peak in the 1930s, with seven daily services provided each way between Exeter and Heathfield. During World War 2, this was reduced to four trains in each direction, with no trains on a Sunday. This was increased to five daily trains after the war. The line was sometimes used as a diversionary route if the South Devon main line was unavailable.

Two sidings were added behind the down platform in 1914, for Scatter Rock Quarry traffic, and a 3/4 mile (1.2 km) siding curved sharply away to the Bridford Quarry of the Devon Basalt and Granite Company; this was in use between 1910 and 1931. The Bridford Barytes Mine also used the railway at Christow, for conveying barium sulphate to Exeter for milling; this traffic ceased in July 1958.

In the winter of 1960 and March 1961, severe flooding of the river Teign washed away the track bed just beyond Trusham and this was never reinstated, thereby isolating Ashton and Christow stations completely. These stations were officially closed as of 1 May 1961 and the tracks lifted in the summer of 1963.

Preceding station	Disused railways	Following station
Ashton (Devon)	Heathfield to Exeter St Davids; Great Western Railway	Dunsford Halt

== The site today ==
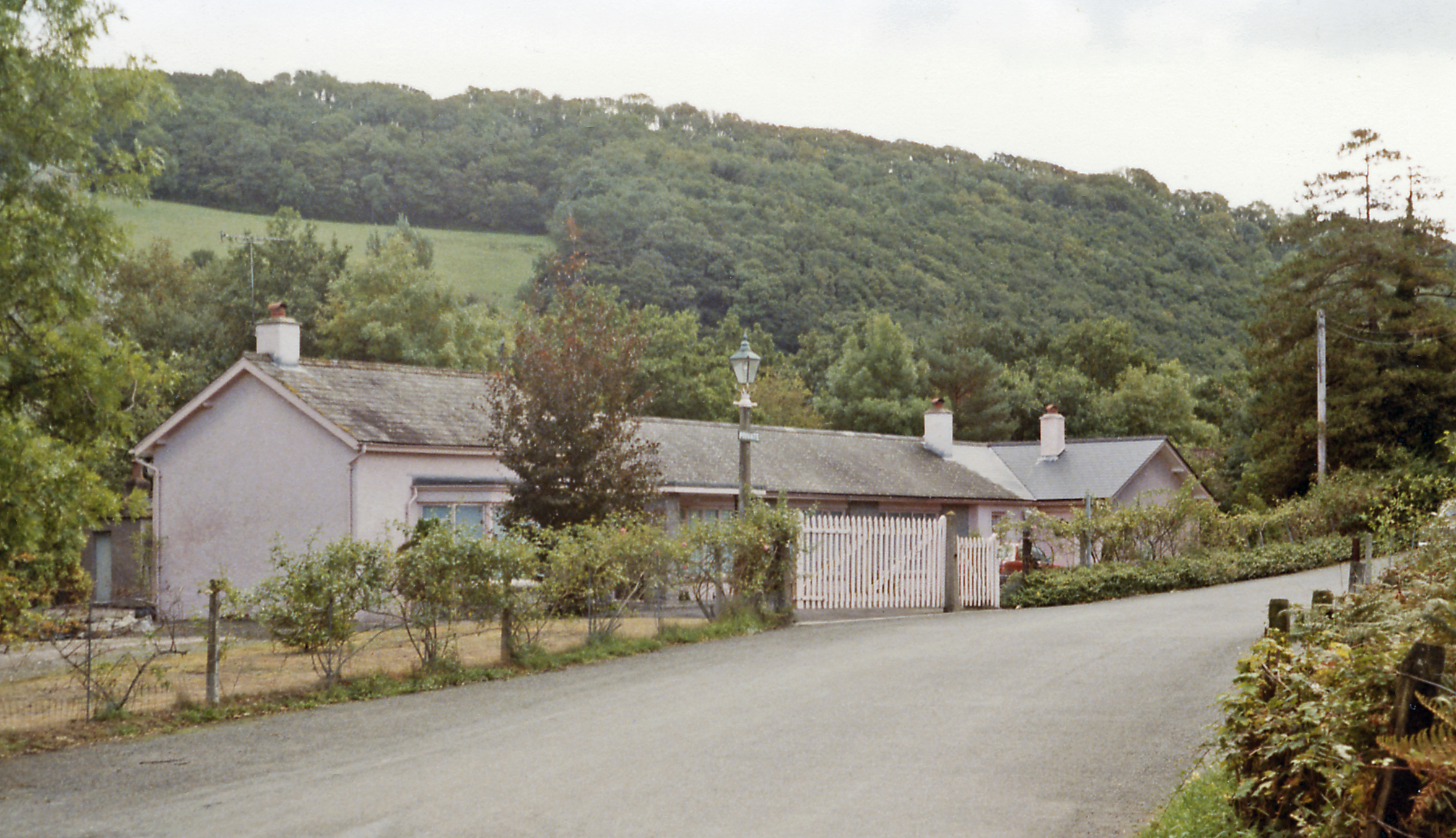
The former station in 1984

The station building is now a private house and the trackbed has been infilled to platform height.

The sidings are now home to the Exeter and Teign Valley Railway. They have a Toad brake van that has been converted into sleeping accommodation.

The Teign Valley line may have a role to play in the future, as an alternative to the Devon's main line route along the Dawlish and Teignmouth coastline which is vulnerable to stormy seas. The Council for the Protection of Rural England (CPRE) put together a feasibility study. Some of the old infrastructure is still in place; 6 miles (9.7 km) of the 21 miles (34 km) of track remained in 2009.
