= Trusham railway station =

Disused railway station in Devon, England

Trusham Station
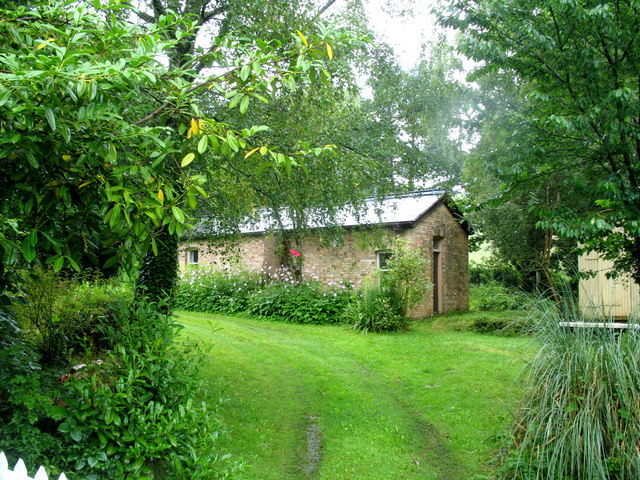
- The site of Trusham station

General information
- Location: Trusham, Teignbridge; England
- Coordinates: 50.6192°N 3.6290°W
- Grid reference: SX8485781220
- Platforms: 2

Other information
- Status: Disused

History
- Original company: Great Western Railway
- Pre-grouping: Great Western Railway
- Post-grouping: Great Western Railway

Key dates
- 9 October 1882: Opened
- 9 June 1958: Closed to passengers
- 4 December 1967: Closed to goods traffic.
Location

Trusham Railway Station was a railway station in the parish of Trusham, serving the villages of Trusham and Hennock in Devon, England, on the Teign Valley line between Newton Abbot and Exeter.

== History ==
Trusham at first only had a single platform on the west side of the line. A goods loop and signal box were added in 1911, this was extended on 8.7.1943 and a short down platform with a concrete waiting shelter was added. Following closure to passengers the loop became a siding and the signal box was downgraded to a ground frame. The loop was reinstated in 1960 and the signal box closed completely in 1961; the goods yard followed on 5.4.1965.

Passenger numbers reached their peak in the 1930s with seven daily services provided each way between Exeter and Heathfield. During World War 2 this was reduced to four trains in each direction, still with no trains on a Sunday. This was increased to five daily trains after the war. The line was sometimes used as a diversionary route if the South Devon main line was unavailable.

=== Freight ===
Crockham Quarry at Trusham provided mineral traffic for the line up until the final years, however by the end of WW2 much of this was being transported away by road. By November 1967 the sidings at Crockham were in such poor condition that the permanent way supervisor at Newton Abbot declared that they could no longer be used.

In the winter of 1960 and March 1961 severe flooding of the Teign washed away the track bed beyond Trusham and this was never reinstated The section of line between Trusham and Christow was abandoned and as of 1 May 1961 and the tracks lifted in the summer of 1963.

=== The present day ===
The station building is now a private house and the trackbed has been infilled to platform height. The old station master's house also survives as a private dwelling. The old corrugated store shed still survives.

The Teign Valley line may have a role to play in the future, as an alternative to the Devon's main line route along the Dawlish coastline which is vulnerable to stormy seas. The Council for the Protection of Rural England (CPRE) put together a feasibility study. Some of the old infrastructure is still in place - 6 miles (9.7 km) of the 21 miles (34 km) of track remained in 2009.

Preceding station	Disused railways	Following station
Chudleigh	Heathfield to Exeter St Davids; Great Western Railway	Ashton (Devon)
