= The Turner Twins =

British adventurers

Hugo and Ross Turner
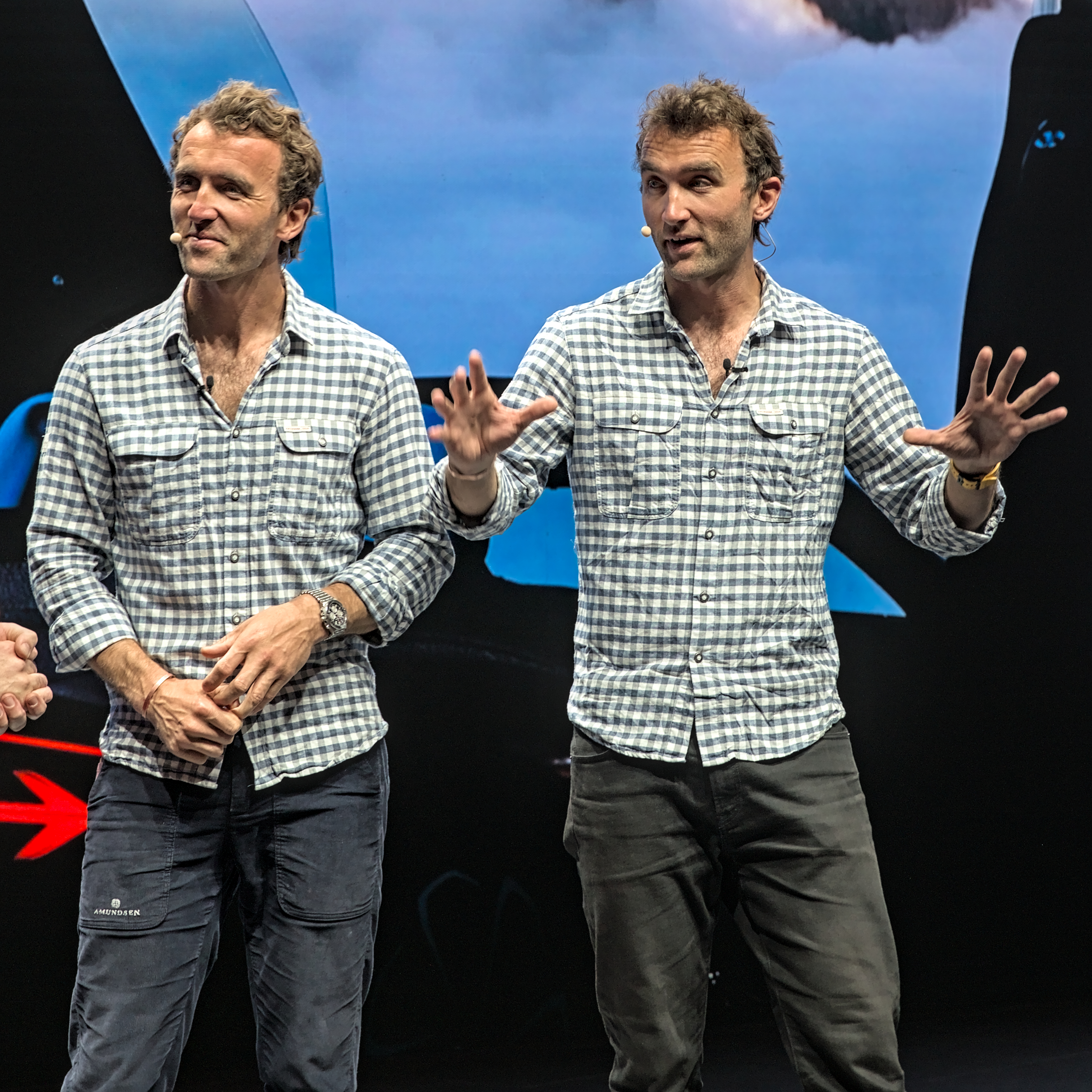
- The Turner Twins in 2024
- Born: 22 October 1988 (age 38); Christow, Exeter, England
- Other name: The Turner Twins
- Education: Loughborough University
- Occupation: Adventurers
- Years active: 2010–present
- Known for: Reaching the poles of inaccessibility
- Website: theturnertwins.co.uk

Hugo Turner FRGS and Ross Turner FRGS (born 22 October 1988), better known as The Turner Twins, are British adventurers best known for their pioneering expeditions.

== Biography ==
The twins were born in Exeter and grew up near Christow in Devon. They attended King's College, Taunton.

They both graduated with degrees in industrial design and technology from Loughborough University in 2011.

They hold two world records: for being part of the youngest four-man crew to row the Atlantic and the first twins to row any of the world's oceans, after successfully rowing the Atlantic Ocean in 2011–12 as part of the Talisker Whisky Atlantic Challenge.

Hugo broke his neck aged 17, resulting in a neck reconstruction. Following this accident the twins have supported spinal research charities.

During their expeditions, the twins support and actively take part in medical research studies at King's College London's Department of Twin Research. They are also known as the "Adventure Guinea Pigs".

They have climbed Mount Elbrus, allowing King's College London's Department of Twin Research and GlaxoSmithKline's Human Performance Lab to conduct research to better understand the effects of high altitude on the human body and the performance of different clothing systems by having one twin wear the replica clothing from George Mallory's 1924 British Mount Everest expedition and the other wear a modern mountaineering equivalent.

They have reached several centre points known as poles of inaccessibility.

== Expeditions ==
=== Atlantic row ===
In 2011, Hugo and Ross rowed across the Atlantic Ocean with teammates Adam Wolley and Greg Symondson. Starting on the island of La Gomera in the Canary Islands, they rowed to the Caribbean island of Barbados, arriving at Port St Charles 41 days, 23 hours, 34 minutes later, setting two world records – the youngest four-man crew and the first twins to have rowed across any of the world's oceans.

=== Greenland ice cap ===
In 2014, the twins attempted to trek across the polar ice cap of Greenland. The expedition set out to support research programmes at King's College London's Department of Twin Research while also comparing old and new clothing – Ross wore replica clothing which Sir Ernest Shackleton used 100 years ago on his "Endurance" expedition, while Hugo used modern clothing. Hugo sustained a knee injury which resulted in a helicopter evacuation after two weeks.

=== Elbrus ===
In 2015, the twins climbed Mount Elbrus in the Caucasus Mountains. The twins tested the traditional clothing and equipment used by mountaineers 100 years ago and compared it against today's modern mountaineering equivalent.

=== Australian pole of inaccessibility ===
In 2016, the twins reached one of the centre points of Australia, otherwise known as the Australian pole of inaccessibility, using paramotors. Adventurers have journeyed to the pole before, but never by paramotor. Having had 6 months worth of training and learning to experience heights of 500–1000 feet, the twins started near Adelaide and eventually reached an area of Australia known as the Red Centre near the town of Papunya.

=== South American pole of inaccessibility ===
In 2017, the twins reached the South American pole of inaccessibility. Starting from the Chilean coastal town of Arica, they cycled across Bolivia into the Brazilian state of Mato Grosso near the city of Cuiabá. They achieved this expedition on bike and cycled 2500 km and taking a time of 5 weeks. They experienced four very different environments: desert, high-altitude plateau, jungle and Brazil with 45 °C heat.

=== North American pole of inaccessibility ===
In September 2018, the twins successfully reached the North American pole of inaccessibility using bicycles. Covering a distance of 2600 km and temperatures ranging between 51 °C and -5 °C this expedition took them four weeks.

=== Iberian pole of inaccessibility ===
In 2019 the twins successfully reached the Iberian pole carrying out a fully electric motorcycle expedition. Beginning in central London, the route crossed France, the Pyrenees and central Spain. Covering a total distance of 2,534 km, it took 7 days to reach the Pole of Inaccessibility with the motorcycles requiring 59 hours of charging.

=== Atlantic pole of inaccessibility ===
In 2022, the twins set out to reach the Atlantic pole of inaccessibility, supporting a plastic research survey for Plymouth University's, International Marine Litter Research Unit, and to test hydrogen fuel cell technology, with a subsequent nationwide tour of the UK. The team missed out on reaching the pole of inaccessibility due to unfavourable weather and engine limitations.

=== Mallory Reimagined ===
In 2025, the Turner Twins began an expedition to climb Mera Peak (6,476m) to research one of mountaineering most infamous climbs. Did George Mallory and Sandy Irvine reach the summit of Everest in 1924? Combining scientific and medical research they collected data to highlight the performance of clothing from the 1920's.

The documentary can be found on Prime Video.

== Medical research ==
The twins work with King's College London's Department of Twin Research to help better understand the genetic and physical make-up. During their various expeditions, the medical research conducted on the twins has focused on a number of key areas, including the gut microbiome, cortisol levels and daily fasting blood glucose levels.

=== Vegan versus meat diets ===
The twins embarked on a trial of a vegan diet versus a typical omnivorous one, with their body composition monitored and their biomarkers tested by King's College London's Department of Twin Research. Hugo's cholesterol level went down on the vegan diet, while Ross's cholesterol level remained high. Hugo also reported that his energy levels whilst training were better and maintained for longer on the vegan diet, along with higher fat loss and more consistent glucose levels. Both Twins wore continuous glucose monitors to test this finding.

== Filmography ==
Television

Year	Title	Role	Channel
2016	The Turner Twins: Red Pole Expedition	Presenter	Red Bull TV
2019	The Twinstitute (TV series)	Participant (Episode 5: Sleep Deprivation)	BBC Two
2022	Double or Nothing	Presenter	Red Bull TV / WaterBear Network
2022	The pole of inaccessibility: a photographer's perspective	Co-presenter	WaterBear Network
2025	High Energy: Time Is Up	Presenter	Waterbear Network/ Ananda TV
2026	Mallory Reimagined: Climbing Back In Time	Presenter	Prime Video
