= Chudleigh Knighton Halt railway station =

Disused railway station in Devon, England

Coordinates: 50.5820°N 3.6330°W

Chudleigh Knighton Halt
- Chudleigh Knighton Halt in 1969

General information
- Location: Chudleigh Knighton, Teignbridge; England
- Grid reference: SX844770
- Platforms: 1

Other information
- Status: Disused

History
- Post-grouping: Great Western Railway

Key dates
- 9 June 1924: Opened
- 9 June 1958: Closed to passengers
- 4 December 1967: line through station was closed.
Location

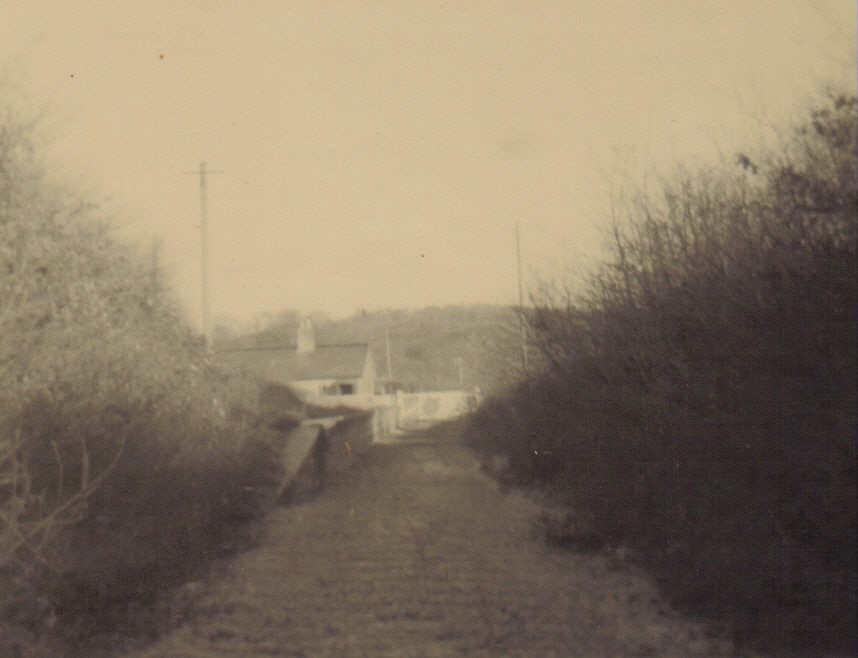
The halt in 1970 shortly after track lifting.

Chudleigh Knighton Halt was on the Teign Valley Line serving the small village of Chudleigh Knighton, Devon, England. The halt, built by the Great Western Railway at a later date than most of the other stations on the line, was located on the west side of Pipehouse Lane off the B3344, to the south of the village.

The first station was constructed of timber with a small corrugated iron pagoda shelter and a simple nameboard, at a cost of £300. After WW2 a concrete platform was provided. A level crossing was located at the platform end. The line through the station closed on 4 December 1967 and the track was still in situ in 1969,

Passenger numbers reached their peak in the 1930s with seven daily services provided each way between Exeter and Heathfield. During World War 2 this was reduced to four trains in each direction, still with no trains on a Sunday. This was increased to five daily trains after the war.

The A38 road now runs over the site of the halt and nothing remains of the station.

Preceding station	Disused railways	Following station
Heathfield (Devon)	Heathfield to Exeter St Davids; Great Western Railway	Chudleigh
