= Heathfield railway station (Devon) =

Disused railway station in Devon, England

Heathfield (Devon) Station
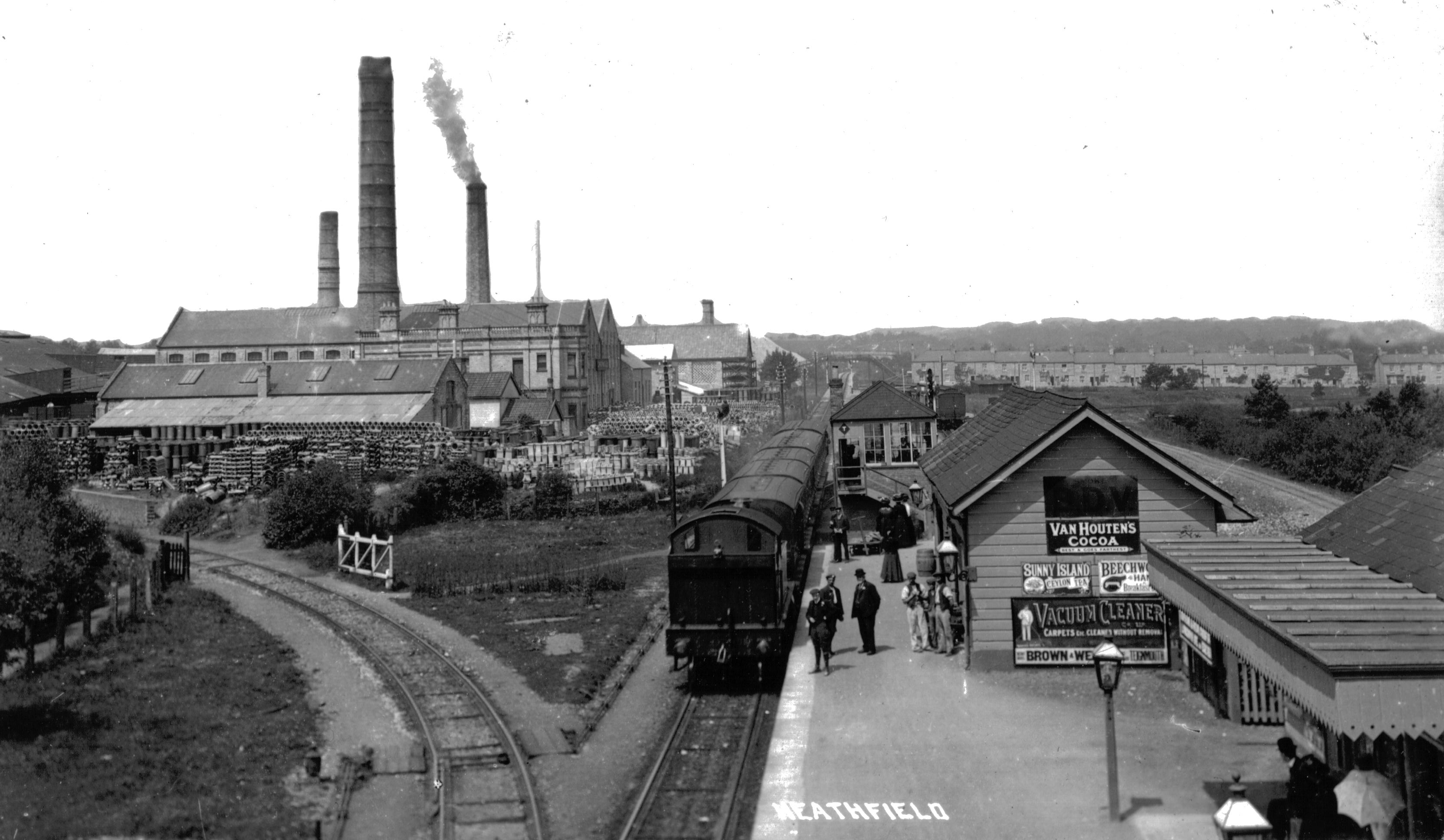
- Heathfield in 1906

General information
- Location: Heathfield, Teignbridge; England
- Coordinates: 50°34′21″N 3°38′46″W
- Platforms: 3

Other information
- Status: Disused

History
- Original company: South Devon Railway
- Pre-grouping: Great Western Railway
- Post-grouping: Great Western Railway

Key dates
- 1 July 1874: Opened as Chudleigh Road
- 1 October 1882: Renamed Heathfield
- 2 March 1959: Closed to passengers
Location

Heathfield railway station, originally Chudleigh Road railway station before the Teign Valley Line opened, was on the Moretonhampstead and South Devon Railway at Heathfield, nearly 4 miles (6.4 km) from Newton Abbot, Devon, England.

== History ==
The station was opened on 1 July 1874 as 'Chudleigh Road', but was renamed 'Heathfield' on 1 October 1882.

It became a junction when the Teign Valley Railway opened to Ashton, Devon in 1882. Until 23 May 1892 all traffic between the two lines had to be transferred at Heathfield as the Moretonhampstead line was built to the 7 ft (2,134 mm) in broad gauge, but the Teign Valley was 4 ft 8 1/2 in (1,435 mm) in standard gauge.

The original station only had one platform serving the Moretonhampstead branch. In 1927 this platform was extended and a new passing loop and platform was provided for down trains came into use on 24 May 1927. Both platforms were signalled for reversible running until 1943 when the crossover was removed. The large pottery of Candy and Company was situated alongside the station and was served by its own siding.

== After 1959 ==
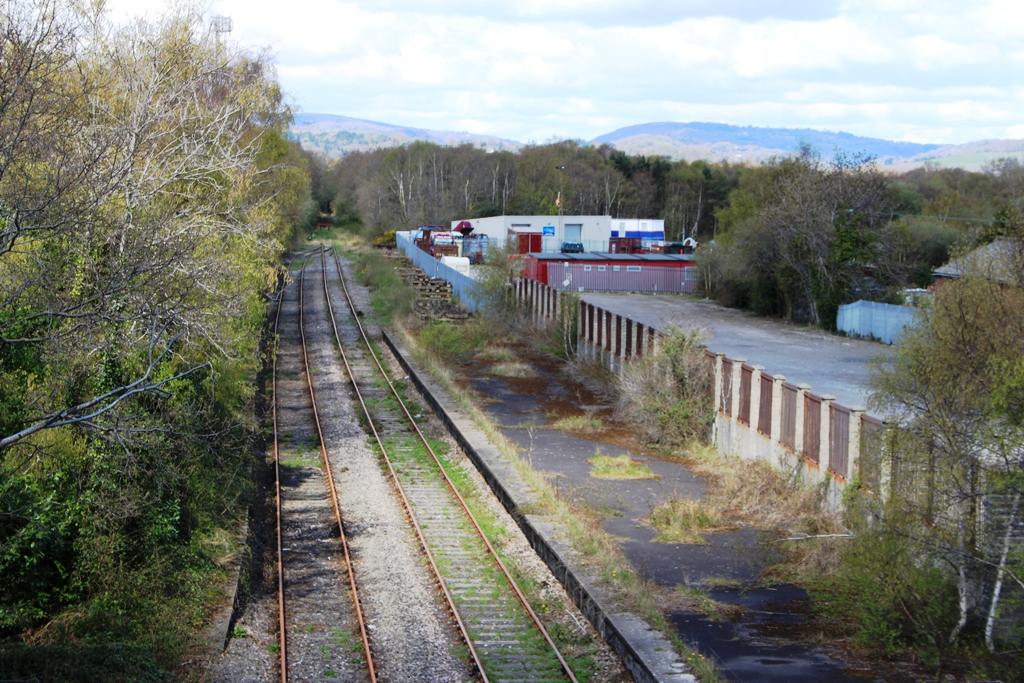
Heathfield station in 2013

The last regular passenger trains ran on 28 February 1959. Since 6 July 1970 Heathfield has been the terminus of the branch line, the few trains running this far serving an oil terminal that opened in 1965.

In 2009 the line was mothballed until December 2011 when it was announced that the section of the line to Heathfield would re-opened to facilitate the transport of timber from Heathfield to Chirk in North Wales by Colas Rail. In the same month a timber siding was opened at Teigngrace, just before the level crossing at Exeter Road, to allow the timber to be loaded onto the freight trains. Teigngrace lacks a passing loop and trains with empty wagons continue up the line to Heathfield to permit locomotives to run around the waggons using the loop in the disused station. The empty freight train then drives back to the timber sidings at Teigngrace to be loaded. Loading of the timber is carried out by the lorries that bring the timber to the sidings.

Following the damage in 2014 to the sea wall at Dawlish one of the suggested alternative routes was via the re-statement of the Heathfield to Alphington rail link.

A new company, Heath Rail Link, met with Network Rail in January 2018 to discuss plans and progress. During the meeting, Network Rail gave authorisation for Heath Rail Link to lease the line once funds were submitted for it. The idea being to provide a commuter service into Newton Abbot with a park and ride facility at Heathfield.

Preceding station	Disused railways	Following station
Teigngrace Halt; Line and station closed	Great Western Railway; Newton Abbot to Moretonhampstead	Brimley; Line and station closed
Teigngrace Halt; Line and station closed	Great Western Railway; Heathfield to Exeter St Davids	Chudleigh Knighton; Line and station closed
