= Teign Valley line =

Disused railway line in Devon, England

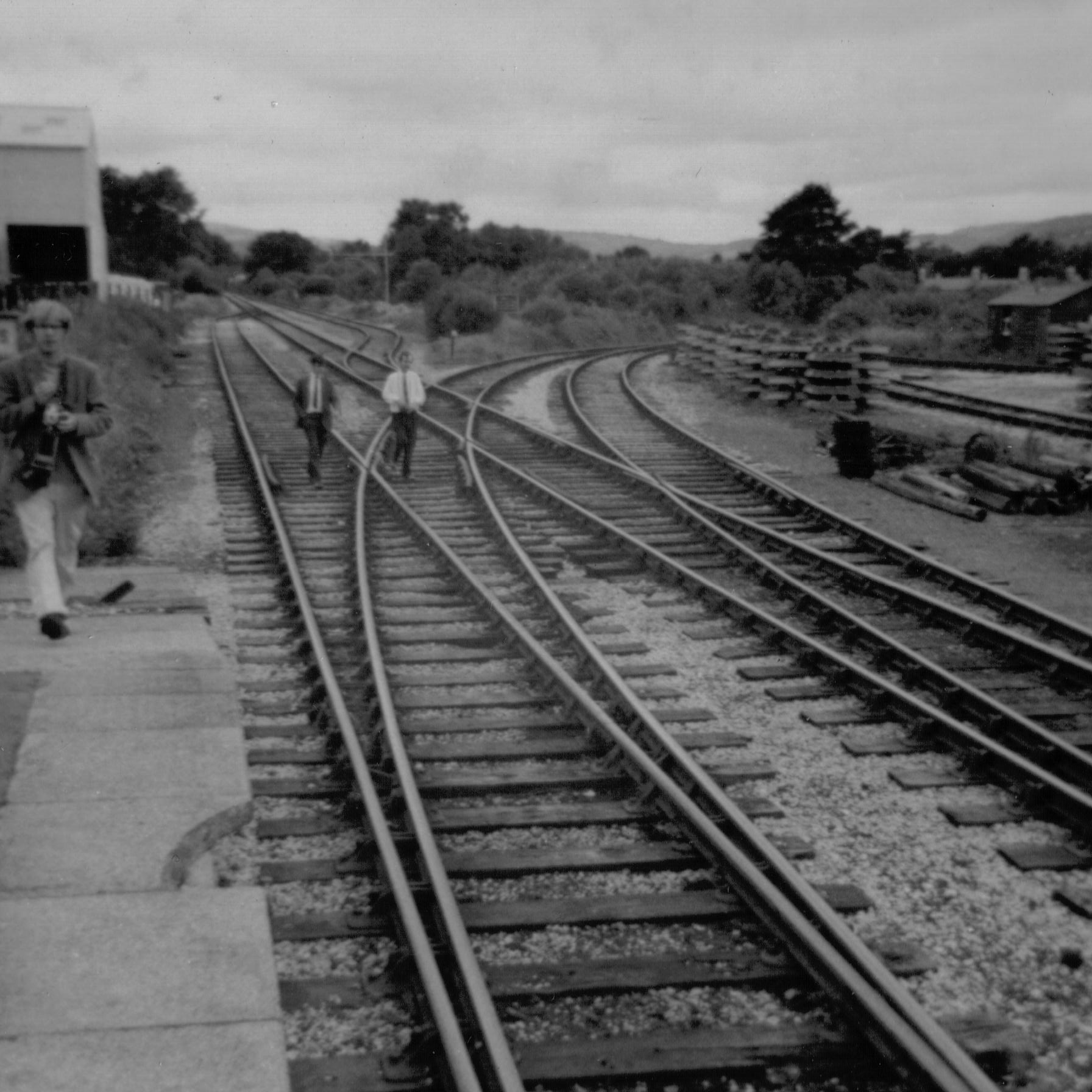
The junction for the Teign Valley line at Heathfield in 1970

The Teign Valley line was a single-tracked railway line that ran from Heathfield to Exeter, via the Teign Valley, in Devon, England. It joined the South Devon main line at Exeter City Basin Junction. The line was open to passenger services between 1882 and 1958.

== History ==
=== Opening ===
Teign Valley Railway Act 1863
- Act of Parliament
- Parliament of the United Kingdom
- Long title: An Act for incorporating "The Teign Valley Railway Company," and for authorizing them to make and maintain "The Teign Valley Railway;" and for other Purposes.
- Citation: 26 & 27 Vict. c. clix

Dates
- Royal assent: 13 July 1863

Text of statute as originally enacted

Exeter, Teign Valley and Chagford Railway Act 1883
- Act of Parliament
- Parliament of the United Kingdom
- Long title: An Act for authorising the Construction of Railways to connect the Teign Valley Railway and the town of Chagford with Exeter; and for other purposes.
- Citation: 46 & 47 Vict. c. ccv

Dates
- Royal assent: 20 August 1883

Text of statute as originally enacted

Exeter, Teign Valley and Chagford Railway (Extension of Time) Act 1886
- Act of Parliament
- Parliament of the United Kingdom
- Long title: An Act to extend the time for purchasing Lands and completing the Railways and works authorised by the Exeter Teign Valley and Chagford Railway Act, 1883.
- Citation: 50 Vict. c. xxiii

Dates
- Royal assent: 25 September 1886

Text of statute as originally enacted

Exeter, Teign Valley and Chagford Railway (Extension of Time) Act 1891
- Act of Parliament
- Parliament of the United Kingdom
- Long title: An Act to revive the powers for the compulsory purchase of lands and to extend the time limited for the completion of the Exeter Teign Valley and Chagford Railway.
- Citation: 54 & 55 Vict. c. cxc

Dates
- Royal assent: 5 August 1891

Text of statute as originally enacted

Exeter, Teign Valley, and Chagford Railway (Extension of Time) Act 1894
- Act of Parliament
- Parliament of the United Kingdom
- Long title: An Act to revive the Powers and further extend the Time for the compulsory purchase of Lands and to extend the Time limited for the completion of the Exeter Teign Valley and Chagford Railway.
- Citation: 57 & 58 Vict. c. cxc

Dates
- Royal assent: 17 August 1894

Text of statute as originally enacted

Exeter Railway Act 1898
- Act of Parliament
- Parliament of the United Kingdom
- Long title: An Act to authorise the Exeter Teign Valley and Chagford Railway Company to construct Deviation Railways to revive the powers and further extend the time limited for the completion of their authorised railway and for other purposes.
- Citation: 61 & 62 Vict. c. ccxix

Dates
- Royal assent: 12 August 1898

Text of statute as originally enacted

Exeter Railway Act 1903
- Act of Parliament
- Parliament of the United Kingdom
- Long title: An Act to authorise the Exeter Railway Company to acquire additional lands to revive and further extend the time for the completion of their authorised railways to raise additional capital and for other purposes.
- Citation: 3 Edw. 7. c. xv

Dates
- Royal assent: 30 June 1903

Text of statute as originally enacted

The Teign Valley Railway Act 1863 (26 & 27 Vict. c. clix) was given royal assent in 1863 and the line opened on 9 October 1882, branching from the Moretonhampstead and South Devon Railway's station at Heathfield, to Christow. Under the Exeter Railway Act 1903 (3 Edw. 7. c. xv) the line was extended by the Exeter Railway Company from Christow to a junction near Exeter St Thomas station. It served mineral quarries in the valley and had a passenger service. For a brief time there was an engine shed at Ashton.

=== Decline ===
The mineral traffic that had provided much of the line's revenues was also its downfall, as the quarries provided roadstone for Devon's expanding and improving road network. In the 1920s and 1930s, the new motor bus services meant that passenger traffic dwindled. The mineral traffic soon followed. Meanwhile, the Great Western Railway placed camp coaches in some of the stations providing holiday accommodation. A small station was opened at Chudleigh Knighton Halt on 9 June 1924.

=== Closure ===
The line saw a resurgence of traffic during the restrictions and petrol rationing after the Second World War however passenger trains were withdrawn in June 1958. This was five years before the publication of The Reshaping of British Railways which led to the closure of many similar routes. Flooding caused the line to be closed entirely between Christow and Exeter in 1961, following which the gradual withdrawal of freight saw the line finally close in 1967.

== Route description ==
The line followed a sinuous course from Heathfield to Exeter, which was the Up direction. From Ashton the line climbs considerably to Longdown, with a long stretch at 1 in 64. From Longdown the line falls at 1 in 58 for several miles.

There were two tunnels at Longdown; Culver Tunnel (248 yards, 227 m) to the west and Perridge Tunnel (836 yards, 764 m) to the east of Longdown.

- Heathfield was a station on the Moretonhampstead line (the Moretonhampstead and South Devon Railway). It had been known as Chudleigh Road but was renamed when it became the junction point. At first the Teign Valley line ran to a bay platform only, with a shunting move the only means of connecting to the other route. This was altered to a running junction on 2 October 1916. It was made a full double junction from May 1943; the intention was to make the line a diversionary route if the Dawlish route should become blocked by enemy action.
- Chudleigh Knighton Halt. Opened 9 June 1924.
- Chudleigh.
- Trusham. There was a short passing loop, and this was much extended in 1943 in connection with the diversionary arrangement referred to above. There was a considerable quarry here, and also at Whetcombe, a short distance towards Exeter.
- Ashton. Originally the northern terminus of the line until 1903.
- Christow.
- Dunsford Halt. Opened 16 January 1928. It was almost two miles (three km) from the village.
- Longdown. Reduced to Longdown Halt on 1 October 1923.
- Ide . Opened 1 July 1903, degraded to a Halt in 1923,
- Alphington Halt. Opened 2 April 1928.
- City Basin Junction was the junction with the Dawlish main line to Exeter.

== Retained infrastructure ==
The A38 road now occupies some of the route near to Chudleigh; the intersection at this point is named Chudleigh Station. A short section of the line in Exeter, known as the Alphington Spur, remains a siding for weekly scrap metal freight trains.

Many of the stations and some of the line's infrastructure still exist:

- Alphington Halt was completely demolished, but it is still possible to see the remains of the bridges over Church Road and Ide lane, and the long curving embankment which now runs beside the Alphington spur connection to the A30. The same fate awaited Ide Halt, with St Ida's Close now built over the station site.
- Longdown station survives in remarkably good condition. Perridge Tunnel is blocked, but the shorter Culver Tunnel is open.
- Dunsford Halt was demolished, but the stations at Christow, Ashton and Trusham station are all still extant having been converted to dwellings.
- The stations at Chudleigh, Chudleigh Knighton Halt and Heathfield did not survive.

== Proposed reopening ==
Reopening of the Teign Valley line was an option considered in the wake of widespread disruption caused by damage to the mainline track at Dawlish by coastal storms in February 2014. The Transport Secretary, Patrick McLoughlin, ordered a review of alternative inland rail routes but no decision to reopen any line was forthcoming.

The Campaign for Better Transport released a report in January 2019 which described the line as their "Priority 2" for reopening, this is a line which requires further development or a change in circumstances such as housing developments to make it viable.
