= North Norfolk Coast Site of Special Scientific Interest =

Area of European importance for wildlife in Norfolk, England

Coordinates: 52.95°N 1°E

North Norfolk Coast SSSI
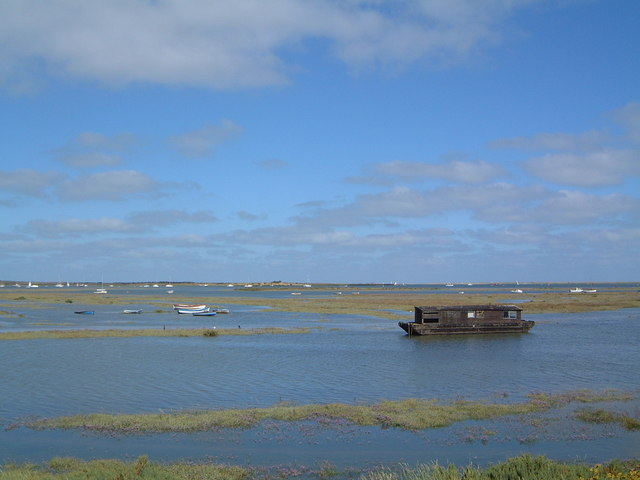
- Salt marsh near Brancaster Staithe

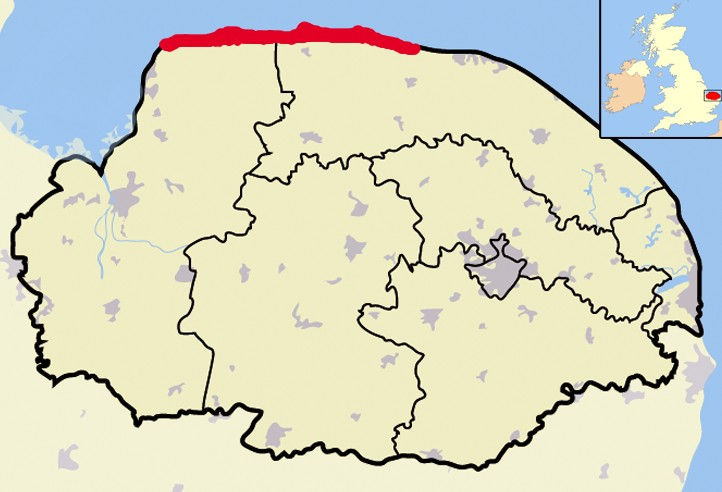
- North Norfolk Coast SSSI shown within Norfolk
- Location: Norfolk, East of England, England
- Established: 1986

The North Norfolk Coast Site of Special Scientific Interest (SSSI) is an area of European importance for wildlife in Norfolk, England. It comprises 7,700 ha (19,027 acres) of the county's north coast from just west of Holme-next-the-Sea to Kelling, and is additionally protected through Natura 2000, Special Protection Area (SPA) listings; it is also part of the Norfolk Coast Area of Outstanding Natural Beauty (AONB). The North Norfolk Coast is also designated as a wetland of international importance on the Ramsar list and most of it is a Biosphere Reserve.

Habitats within the SSSI include reed beds, salt marshes, freshwater lagoons and sand or shingle beaches. The wetlands are important for wildlife, including some scarce breeding birds such as pied avocets, western marsh harriers, Eurasian bitterns and bearded reedlings. The location also attracts migrating birds including vagrant rarities. Ducks and geese winter along this coast in considerable numbers, and several nature reserves provide suitable conditions for water voles, natterjack toads and several scarce plants and invertebrates.

The area is archaeologically significant, with artefacts dating back to the Upper Paleolithic. The mound of an Iron Age fort is visible at Holkham, and the site of a 23 ha (57 acres) Roman naval port with a fort built on the castrum pattern is just outside Brancaster. The site of the medieval "chapel" (probably a domestic dwelling) at Blakeney is no longer accessible. Remains of military use from both world wars include an armoured fighting vehicle gunnery range, a hospital and bombing ranges, as well as passive defences such as pillboxes, barbed wire and tank traps.

The SSSI is economically important to the area because of the tourists it attracts for birdwatching and other outdoor activities, although sensitive wildlife sites are managed to avoid damage from the large numbers of visitors. Another threat is the encroachment of the sea on this soft coast. The Environment Agency considers that managed retreat is likely to be the long-term solution, and is working with the Norfolk Wildlife Trust to create new reserves inland to compensate for the loss of scarce habitats at the coast.

== Description ==
The SSSI is a long, narrow strip of coast that starts at the eastern boundary of The Wash between Old Hunstanton and Holme-next-the-Sea, and runs east for about 43 km (27 mi) to Kelling. The southern boundary runs roughly west to east except where it detours around towns and villages, and never crosses the A149 coast road.

The SSSI has a wide variety of habitats, with bare mud, sand and shingle characterising the intertidal zone along the whole of the coast, although higher areas may have algae or eelgrass that are grazed by ducks and geese in winter. The salt marshes which form on sheltered coasts, in the lee of islands, or behind spits are described in the SSSI notification document as "among the best in Europe" due to their exceptionally diverse flora. Sand dunes occur at several places along the coast, but the best examples are at Holme Dunes, Holkham, Blakeney Point, and Scolt Head Island. The latter two sites are also important for geomorphology research purposes as structures consisting mainly of shingle ridges. Reed beds are fairly localised, but substantial areas occur at Titchwell Marsh, Brancaster and Cley Marshes. Grassland is represented by grazing pasture reclaimed from former salt marsh, with wetter areas at Cley and Salthouse marshes. Woodland is limited in the SSSI, although a belt of Corsican pine planted at Holkham has provided shelter for other trees and shrubs to become established.

== History ==
=== To 1000 AD ===
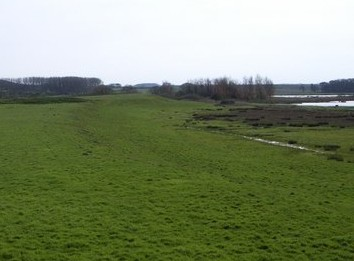
The mound of Holkham fort is visible at the end of the raised track, formerly its only access.

Norfolk has a long history of human occupation dating back to the Palaeolithic, and including significant archaeology. Both modern and Neanderthal people were present in the area between 100,000 and 10,000 years ago, before the last glaciation, and humans returned as the ice retreated northwards. The archaeological record is poor until about 20,000 years ago, partly because of the then prevailing very cold conditions, but also because the coastline was much further north than at present. As the ice retreated during the Mesolithic (10,000–5,000 BCE), the sea level rose, filling what is now the North Sea. This brought the Norfolk coastline much closer to its present line, so that many ancient sites are under the sea. Early Mesolithic flint tools with characteristic long blades up to 15 cm (5.9 in) long found on the present-day coast at Titchwell date from a time when it was 60–70 km (37–43 mi) from the sea. Other flint tools have been found dating from the Upper Paleolithic (50,000–10,000 BCE) to the Neolithic (5,000–2,500 BCE).

By 11,000 BC, the makers of the long blades had gone. Two timber platforms have been identified within the peat at Titchwell, and may possibly be rare Bronze Age (2,500–800 BCE) survivals. Seahenge is another early Bronze Age site found on the coast at Holme in 1998. It consists of a ring of 55 oak posts and was built in 2049 BC; a similar nearby structure, Holme II, may be almost two centuries older. A large Iron Age fort at Holkham enclosed 2.5 ha (6.1 acres) at the end of a sandy spit in what was then salt marsh, and remained in use until the defeat of the Iceni in 47 AD.

Roman period settlements have been discovered all along the Norfolk Coast, notably the complex at Branodunum, which covered at least 23 ha (57 acres) near Brancaster. This site included a fort built on the castrum pattern enclosing 2.6 ha (6.3 acres) within its walls, 2.9 m (10 ft) wide. The fort had internal turrets at the corners and was backed by an earth rampart. Early Saxon sites are scarce close to the Norfolk coast, but a gold bracteate found near Blakeney Chapel was a rare and significant 6th-century find, and there is a somewhat later Saxon cemetery at Thornham. The Danelaw left few tangible traces within the SSSI, but place names such as Holkham ("ship town") reflect the Viking influence. Saxon building foundations were described as the ruins of "Cley Chapel" on a 1797 map, although it is more likely that they belonged to a barn.

=== Medieval to nineteenth century ===
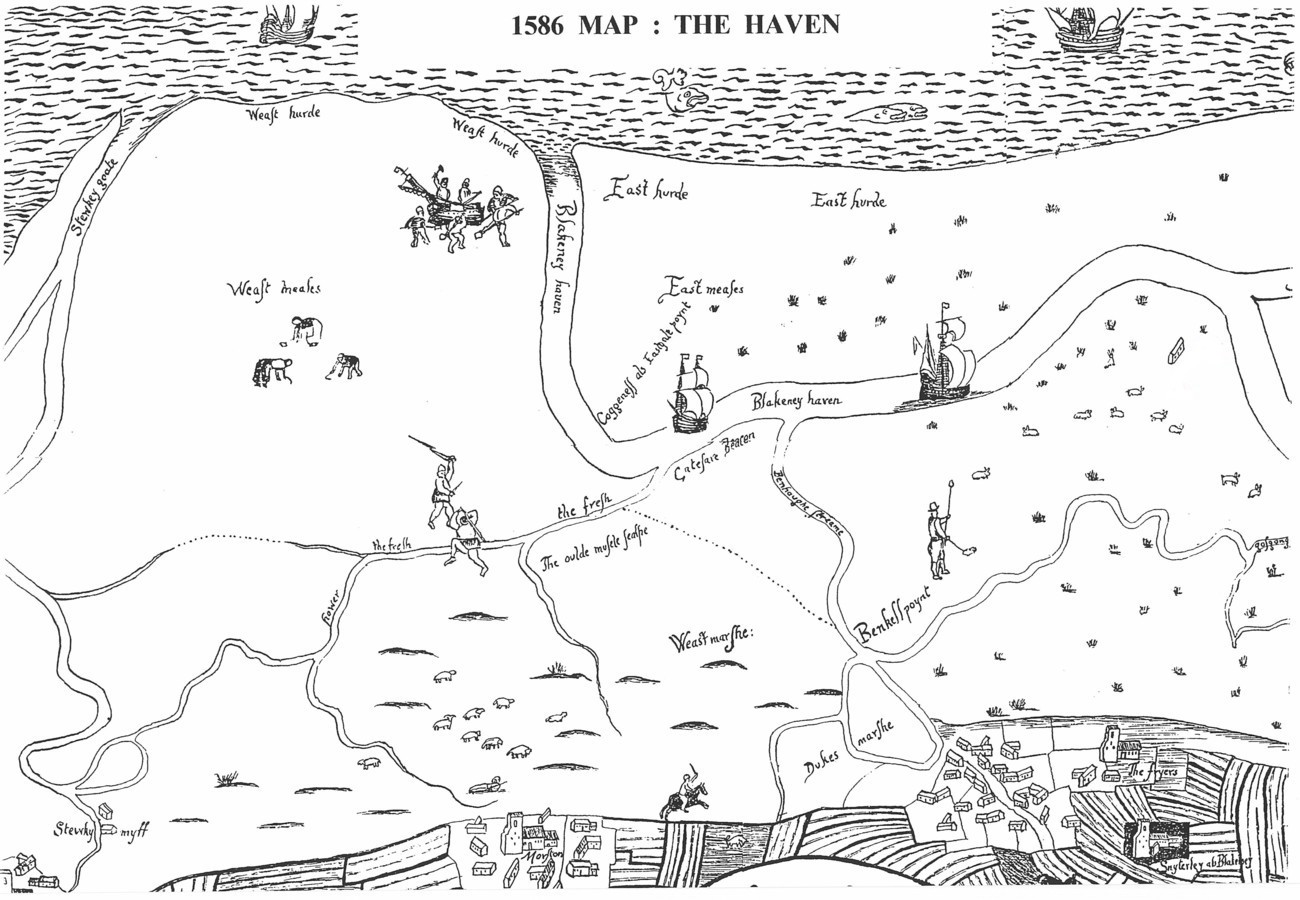
Blakeney Haven in 1586

An "eye" is an area of higher ground in the marshes, dry enough to support buildings. Cley Eye had been farmed since the earliest human habitation, and was 28 ha (70 acres) in extent in 1651, but is much reduced by coastal erosion. The Eye and its Saxon barn were accessed by an ancient causeway, passable at low tide. A 1588 map showed "Black Joy Forte" in the same area, which may have been intended as a defence against the Spanish Armada, but was never completed. On the other side of the Glaven, Blakeney Eye had a ditched enclosure during the 11th and 12th centuries, and a building known as "Blakeney Chapel", which was occupied from the 14th century to around 1600, and again in the late 17th century. Despite its name, it is unlikely that it had a religious function. Nearly a third of the mostly 14th-to-16th-century pottery found within the larger and earlier of the two rooms was imported from the continent, reflecting the Glaven ports' importance in international trade at this time.

The sheltered waters of Blakeney Haven had brought prosperity to the internationally important Glaven ports of Cley, Wiveton and Blakeney. Blakeney gained its market charter in 1222, and the three ports, along with Salthouse, were jointly required to provide three ships for Edward II in 1322, having previously contributed to his father's navy in 1301. By the early 15th century, Blakeney was one of the few ports permitted to trade in horses, gold and silver, through "merchants sworn by oath to the king", which contributed to the town's growing wealth. In 1640, land reclamation schemes, especially those by Henry Calthorpe just to the west of Cley, led to the silting up of the shipping channel and relocation of the wharf, and further reclamation east of the Glaven meant that all the Glaven ports declined; Cley and Wiveton silted up in the 17th century, but Blakeney had packet ships until 1840. Similar marsh reclamation schemes took place elsewhere, often with the same consequence for the local harbours, as for example at Holkham. Only Wells-next-the-Sea had significant trade into the late 20th century.

=== Twentieth century coastal defences ===
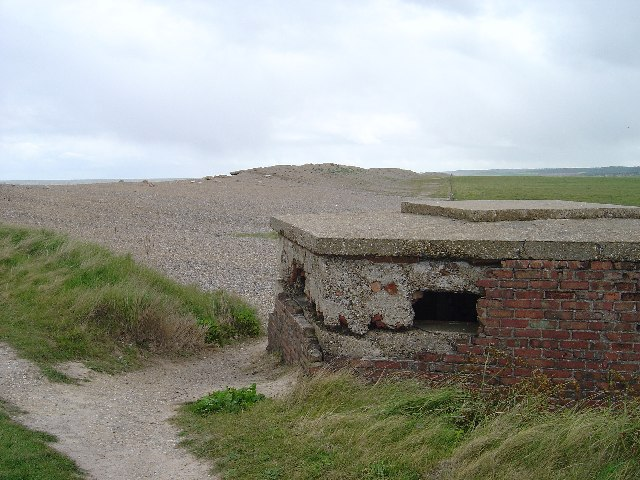
Ruined World War II pillbox at Cley

Artillery may have been installed at Gun Hill on the coast near Burnham Overy during the Napoleonic Wars, but there were no modern fortifications in north Norfolk at the start of World War I. Following the German naval attack on Great Yarmouth in November 1914, defences such as trenches, concrete pillboxes and gun batteries were constructed along much of the Norfolk coast. The main bases were outside the SSSI boundaries, but Thornham Marsh was used between 1914 and 1918 by the Royal Flying Corps as a bombing range. A World War I concrete building on Titchwell's west bank was let as holiday accommodation until the British Army returned in 1942; some brickwork on Titchwell Marsh is all that remains of a military hospital dating from that period.

There were no new fortifications along this coast at the start of World War II. After the fall of France in 1940, the threat of invasion led to the creation of new defences. In addition to the installation of anti-tank and other passive obstacles, fourteen coastal batteries, each of two guns, were constructed. Some of these emplacements and other military bases fell within the SSSI area. Four spigot mortar base plates found at Holme dunes may not have originated at that site, since there is no record of such armament there. The marsh at Titchwell was reflooded, and pillboxes built into the beach bank. Between 1942 and 1945, the marsh was used by the Royal Tank Regiment; an armoured fighting vehicle gunnery range was established and banks were constructed for firing practice, with targets set at 900 m (980 yd) intervals. Some of the still extant islands were built to hold "pop-up" targets, operated by cables from winches in a building whose foundations now lie below a bird hide. Remains of the triangular concrete track used by the tanks also survive. Military activities continued in the area after the war, and the Royal Air Force returned to Thornham Marsh between 1950 and 1959. Bombing practice was supervised from a control tower, which was demolished in 1962, leaving only a concrete structure opposite the end of Titchwell's west bank. The remains of two World War II Covenanter tanks, probably used as targets, are sometimes exposed at low tide. The SS Vina, an 1894 cargo steamer, was anchored offshore in 1944 for use as an RAF target, but a gale dragged her to the sands off Titchwell, where the wreck can still be seen at low tide.

Brancaster beach had a base including three pillboxes, Nissen huts and two gun emplacements, and another possible base, comprising about fifty different structures, was located in a salt marsh north-east of Burnham Overy Staithe. A wreck at the west end of Scolt Head Island was used as a bombing target, and the remains of a Blenheim bomber were found at the north of the island in 2004.

Royal Artillery military fortifications were established at Cley beach, including two 6-inch (15.24 cm) guns, five buildings, two pillboxes, a minefield, and concrete anti-tank blocks. A spigot mortar emplacement and an Allan Williams Turret machine gun emplacement were sited closer to the village. One of the pillboxes and remains of the beach gun emplacements were still surviving as of 2012. The military camp accommodated 160 men and was later used to hold prisoners of war. Near the end of the war, the camp was used to house East European refugees, and was finally pulled down in 1948. Many of the wartime buildings were destroyed by the Royal Engineers in 1955, but the generator house was taken over by the coastguard service as an observation post. It was acquired by the NWT in 1983, and the upper part was used as a look-out, while the larger lower section became a beach café. The building was overwhelmed by shingle in a storm in 2008, and subsequently demolished.

=== Conservation ===
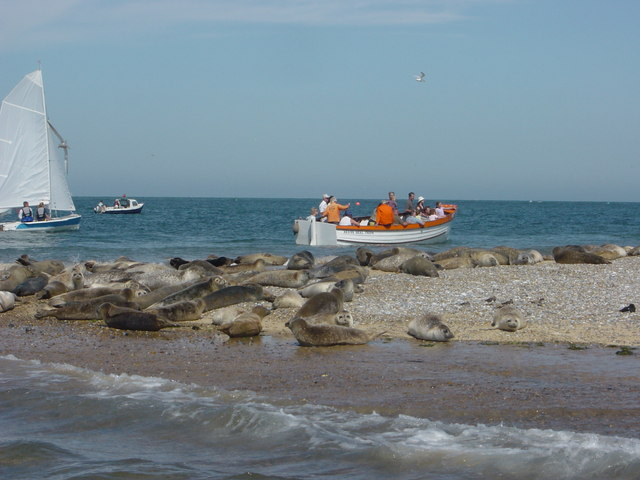
Seals at Blakeney Point, the first protected area of the coast

The first step towards the protection of this coast by a national conservation body was the purchase of Blakeney Point from the Calthorpe family by banker Charles Rothschild in 1912. Rothschild gave the property to the National Trust in 1912, which has managed it since. In 1926, another early protected area was created when Norfolk birdwatcher Dr Sydney Long bought the land which makes up the Cley Marshes reserve for the sum of £5,100, to be held "in perpetuity as a bird breeding sanctuary". Long then went on to establish the Norfolk Wildlife Trust (NWT).

The current SSSI was created in 1986 from pre-existing SSSIs at Blakeney Point, Holme Dunes, Cley, and Salthouse Marshes (all designated in 1954), Morston Saltmarshes and Brancaster Manor (1968), Stiffkey Saltmarshes (1969), Thornham Marshes (1972) and Titchwell Marshes (1973), together with the national nature reserves (NNRs) at Scolt Head Island (1967) and Holkham (1968), and substantial formerly undesignated areas.

Although much of the SSSI is in private hands, considerable areas are managed by large conservation organisations. As well as the two NNRs, there is an RSPB reserve at Titchwell Marsh, and Norfolk Wildlife Trust reserves are at Cley and Salthouse Marshes. The NWT also manages the Holme Dunes NNR. In addition to Blakeney Point, the National Trust owns land at Brancaster Staithe.

The SSSI covers 7,700 ha (19,027 acres) and is additionally protected through Natura 2000, Special Protection Area (SPA) and Ramsar listings, and is part of the Norfolk Coast Area of Outstanding Natural Beauty (AONB). Scolt Head Island and the coast from the Holkham NNR to Salthouse are a Biosphere Reserve.

== Fauna and flora ==
=== Birds ===
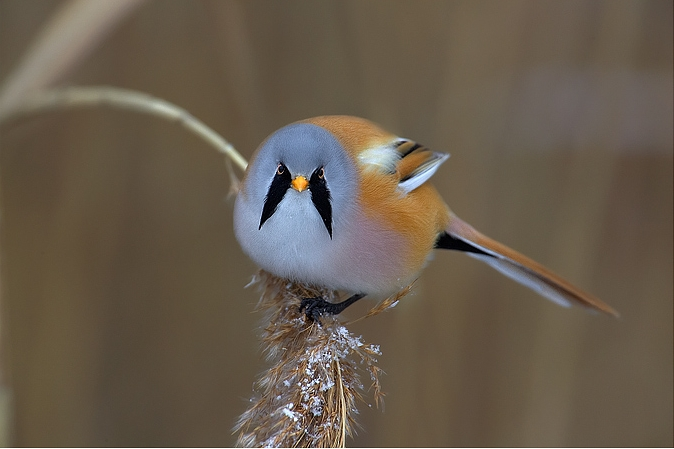
Bearded reedling

The SSSI is designated as a Special Protection Area for birds for its variety of coastal habitats. The large breeding colonies of Sandwich terns and little terns, especially those at Blakeney Point and Scolt Head Island, are of "European importance" as defined in the Birds Directive, and the coast as a whole meets Natural England's criteria for nationally important populations of common terns, pied avocets and reedbed specialists like western marsh harriers, Eurasian bitterns and bearded reedlings. Other birds nesting in the wetlands include the northern lapwing, common redshank, and sedge, reed and Cetti's warblers. Ringed plovers and Eurasian oystercatchers lay their eggs on bare sand in the dunes. Little egrets, Eurasian spoonbills, ruffs and black-tailed godwits are present for much of the year, and the egret and spoonbill have both started nesting within the SSSI.

In spring and early summer, migrant birds including the little gull, black tern, Temminck's stint and garganey may pass through on their way to breed elsewhere. In the autumn, birds arrive from the north; some, such as whimbrels, curlew sandpipers and little stints, just pausing for a few days to refuel before continuing south, others staying for the winter. Offshore, great and Arctic skuas, northern gannets and black-legged kittiwakes may pass close by in favourable winds. Large numbers of ducks winter along the coast, including many Eurasian wigeons, Eurasian teals, mallards and gadwalls, goldeneyes and northern pintails. Red-throated divers are usually on the sea, and brent geese feed on sea lettuce and other green algae. Barn owls and sometimes hen harriers quarter the marshes in winter, and snow bunting flocks can be found on the beaches. Thousands of geese, mainly pink-footed, roost at Holkham.

The SSSI's north-facing east coast location can be favourable for huge numbers of migrating birds when the weather conditions are right. These may include vagrant rarities. A black-winged stilt, which acquired the nickname "Sammy", arrived at Titchwell in 1993 and became a permanent resident up to its disappearance in 2005. Other major rarities included a western sandpiper at Cley in 2012, a rufous-tailed robin at Warham Greens in 2011, and a black-winged pratincole at Titchwell in 2009.

=== Other animals ===
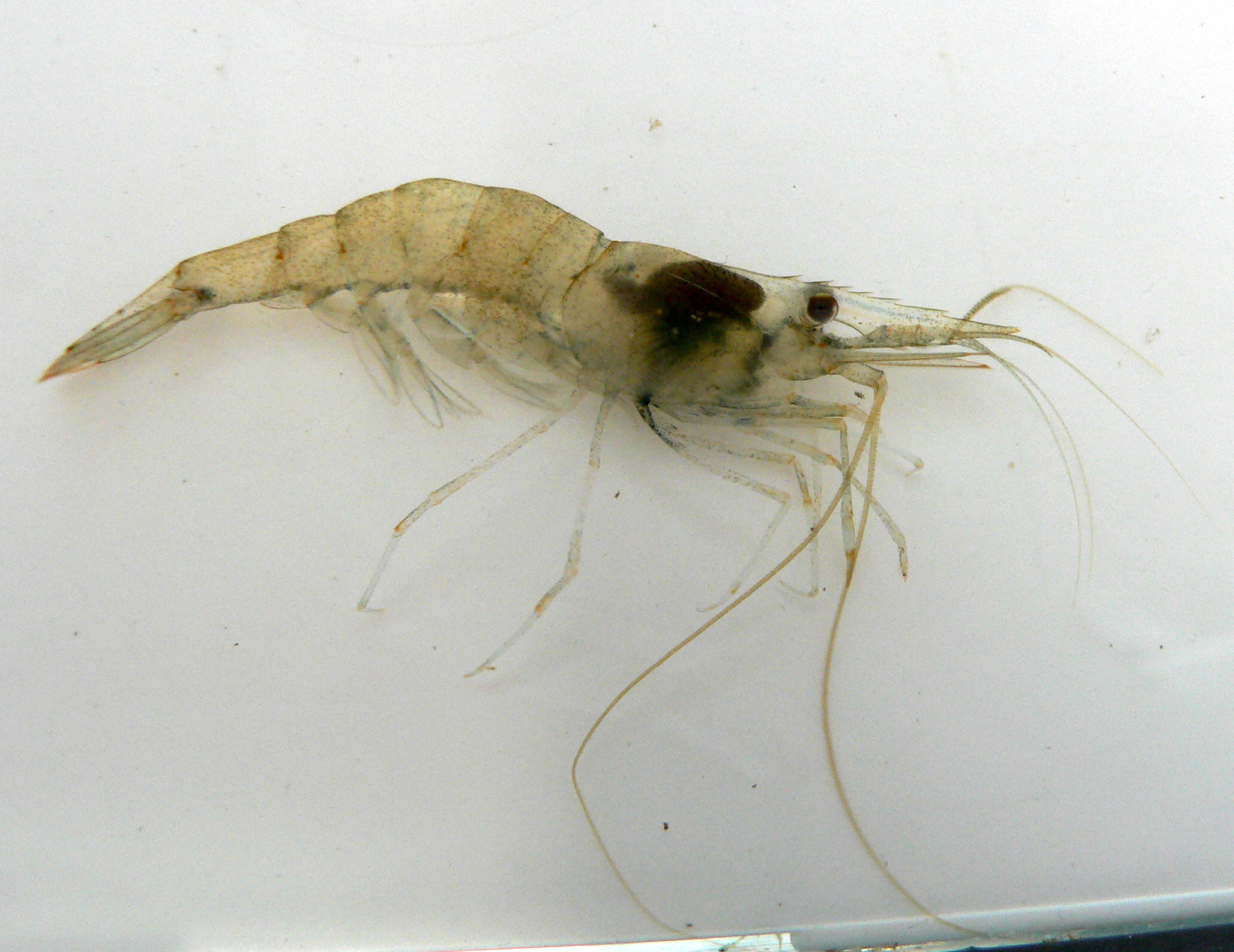
Atlantic ditch shrimp

Water voles are a highly threatened species in the UK, with a 70–90% decline in numbers mainly due to predation by the introduced American mink, but also habitat loss and water pollution. East Anglian sites of national importance for this species include Cley, Titchwell and other Norfolk coastal sites. Brown hares are widespread, and European otters may be seen at several locations. Both common and grey seals can be seen at the Blakeney Point colony and off the beaches. The common frog, common toad and common lizard all occur in suitable habitats, and the rare natterjack toad breeds at Holkham and Holme.

The green hairstreak, purple hairstreak, hummingbird hawk-moth and ghost moth are sometimes seen, particularly in the woods at Holkham, along with the common butterfly and moth species. In some years the clouded yellow, Camberwell beauty, painted lady or diamondback moth may be seen, and the silver Y can sometimes occur in huge numbers. The dune tiger beetle is a nationally rare denizen of moist sand dunes.

The lagoons behind the shingle beach at Salthouse and Cley are salty due to the percolation of seawater through the bank. These saline lagoons may cover mud, firm sand or submerged vegetation, and hold some rare and threatened invertebrates including the starlet sea anemone, lagoon sand shrimp, Atlantic ditch shrimp, and lagoon cockle. These marshes are the only reliable UK site for the water beetle yellow pogonus, and even here it is localised and hard to find.

=== Plants ===
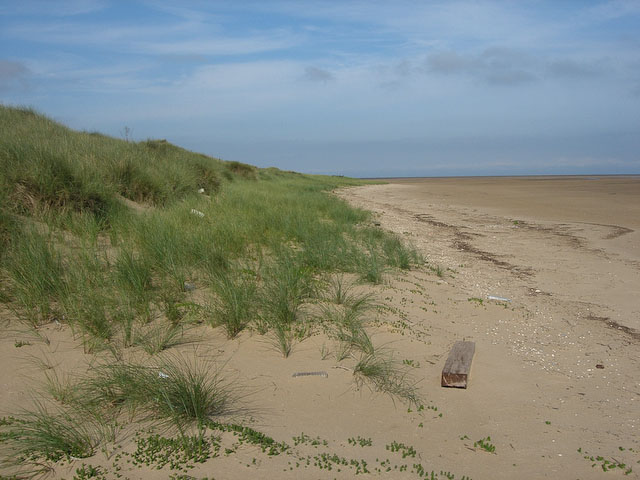
Marram grass binds the dunes

On exposed parts of the coast, the muds and sands are scoured by the tides, and have no vegetation except possibly algae or eelgrass. Where the shoreline is more protected, internationally important salt marshes can form, with several uncommon species. The salt marshes contains glassworts and common cord grass in the most exposed regions, with a succession of plants following on as the marsh becomes more established: first sea aster, then mainly sea lavender, with sea purslane in the creeks and smaller areas of sea plantain and other common marsh plants. The uncommon spiral tasselweed and long-bracted sedge are other lower salt marsh specialists. Scrubby sea-blite and matted sea lavender are characteristic plants of the drier upper salt marsh, although they are uncommon in the UK away from this coast. They may occur alongside scarce species including lesser centaury, curved hard-grass and sea pearlwort, with soft hornwort in the dykes.

Grasses such as sea couch grass and sea poa grass are important in the driest areas of the marshes, and on the coastal dunes, where marram grass, sand couch-grass, lyme-grass and red fescue help to bind the sand. Sea holly and sand sedge are other specialists of this arid habitat, and petalwort is a nationally rare bryophyte found on damper dunes. Bird's-foot trefoil, pyramidal orchid, bee orchid and carline thistle flower on the dunes, and Holkham's Corsican pines shelter creeping lady's tresses and yellow bird's nest orchids. The shingle ridges on Scolt Head Island and from Blakeney Point east to Salthouse attract biting stonecrop, sea campion, yellow horned poppy, sea thrift and sea beet. Sea barley is a scarcer species of this habitat.

The reedbeds, the largest of which are at the Cley, Salthouse and Titchwell reserves, are dominated by common reed, and salt marsh rush, brackish water crowfoot, sea clubrush and common bulrush also occur in the various wetland habitats. The coastal pastures at Cley and Salthouse Marshes have jointleaf rush, common silverweed, and less common grasses such as annual beard grass, marsh foxtail, and slender hare's-ear. The flat land just inland from the dunes at Holkham was reclaimed from the marshes by the nineteenth century and was initially used for grazing. It was made arable during World War II, but the water levels have been raised to make the fields attractive to breeding and wintering birds. The pastures are of international importance for the tens of thousands of geese and ducks that feed there in the winter months.

== Access and facilities ==
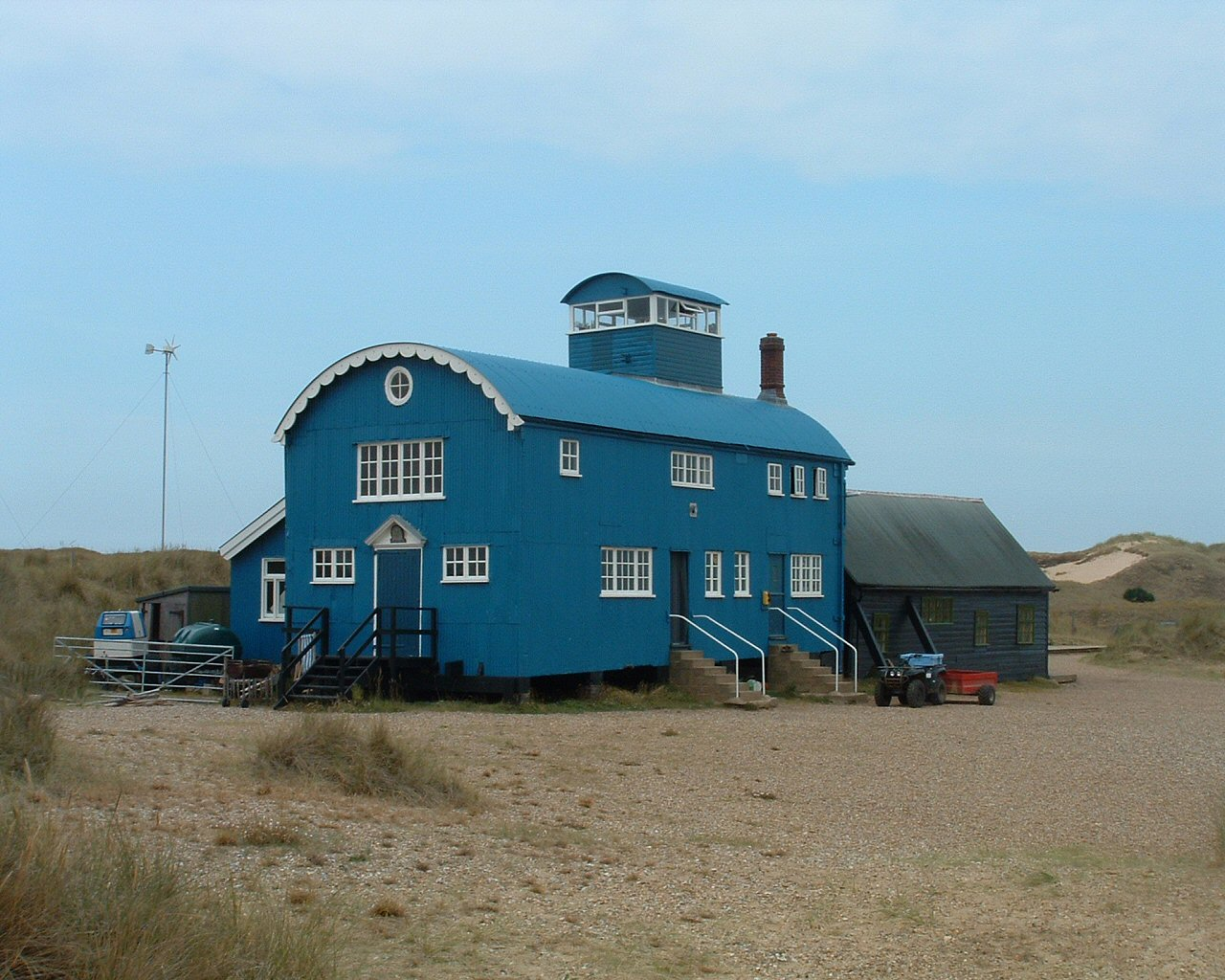
The former lifeboat station, now a visitor centre, at Blakeney Point

Scolt Head Island is accessed by a ferry from Burnham Overy Staithe which runs between April and September. Blakeney Point can also be reached by boats from Morston quay, either to see the seal colonies or to avoid the long walk up the shingle spit from Cley Beach. The National Trust has an information centre and tea room at the quay, and a visitor centre on the Point, formerly a lifeboat station, is open in the summer months.

The rest of the SSSI is close to the A149 coast road, and can be accessed at many points by footpaths or roads. The main nature-orientated facilities are on the major reserves. Holme Dunes NNR is accessed from Holme-next-the-Sea. It has a visitor centre, three bird hides, one of which has disabled access, and a 4 km (2.5 mi) nature trail. The other reserves are all adjacent to the A149. Titchwell Marsh RSPB is just west of Titchwell village and has a visitor centre, café and hides. Most of the reserve and its facilities are wheelchair accessible, but the last part of the footpath to the beach is rough, and crosses a steep bank. The two bird hides at Holkham NNR can be reached from the end of Lady Anne's Drive in Holkham village; there is also a car park further east on Beach Road, Wells-next-the-Sea. Cley Marshes visitor centre and car park are to the south of the A149, opposite the main reserve. The centre and four of the five bird hides are accessible to people with limited mobility.

Their proximity to the main coast road means that the reserves can be accessed by bus as well as car. The Peddars Way National Trail runs the length of the SSSI, and only short sections of this part of the long distance footpath venture south of the SSSI boundary.

== Recreation ==
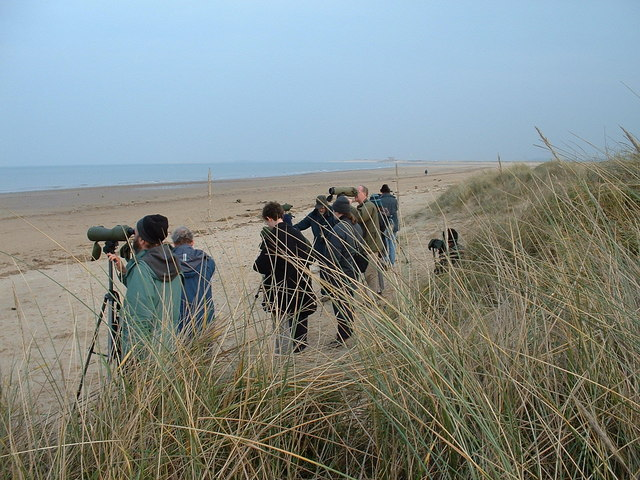
Birdwatching visitors help to support the local economy.

A 2005 survey at six North Norfolk coastal sites (Snettisham, Titchwell, Holkham, Morston Quay, Blakeney and Cley) found that 39 per cent of visitors gave birdwatching as the main purpose of their visit. The 7.7 million day visitors and 5.5 million who made overnight stays in the area in 1999 are estimated to have spent £122 million, and created the equivalent of 2,325 full-time jobs. Titchwell Marsh RSPB, Cley Marshes NWT and Holkham NNR each attract 100,000 or more visitors annually.

The small village of Titchwell shows the effect that wildlife visitors can have locally. It adjoins the RSPB's busiest reserve, Titchwell Marsh, and a 2002 survey reported that an estimated 137,700 visitors spent £1.8 million in the area in 1998. The village has two three-star hotels and a shop selling telescopes and binoculars, although it does not have a general store or a public house.

The large number of visitors sometimes has negative effects. Wildlife may be disturbed, a frequent difficulty for species that breed in exposed areas such as ringed plovers, little terns and common seals, but also wintering geese. Plants can be trampled, which is a particular problem in sensitive habitats such as sand dunes and vegetated shingle. Damage is reduced by measures such as wardening breeding colonies, using fences, boardwalks and signs to control access, and appropriate positioning of car parks. The Norfolk Coast Partnership, a grouping of conservation and environmental bodies, divide the coast into zones for tourism development purposes. Holme dunes, Holkham dunes and Blakeney Point, sensitive habitats suffering from visitor pressure, were designated as red-zone areas with no development or parking improvements to be recommended. "Orange" locations had fragile habitats, but were under less tourism pressure, or, as with the large nature reserves, were equipped to cope with many visitors. The most robust sites, mainly outside the SSSI, were placed in the green zone.

== Threats ==
The underlying geology of the North Norfolk coast is Cretaceous chalk, exposed at Hunstanton cliffs just to the west of the SSSI, but for the entire length of the SSSI coast, the chalk is buried by soft Quaternary glacial debris. Unlike the rapidly eroding soft cliffs further east, the coast of the SSSI has shown a less consistent pattern, with a net accretion of beach material between 1880 and 1950. This coastline is threatened by climate change, with sea level rising an estimated at 1–2 mm per year for the last 100 years, increasing the risk of flooding and coastal erosion.

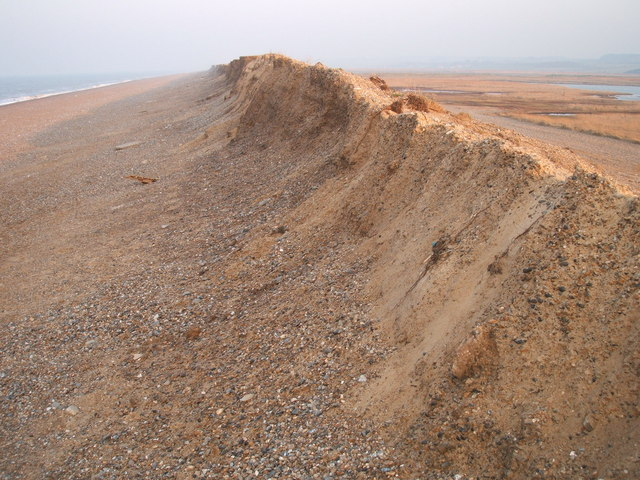
The shingle ridge at Cley is moving southwards through the marshes.

One of the most vulnerable stretches is that between Blakeney Point and Weybourne, which included the Cley and Salthouse Marsh reserves. The coast here is protected by a shingle ridge, but the sea attacks the ridge and spit through tidal and storm action, with a single storm sometimes moving a "spectacular" amount of shingle. The Blakeney Point spit has sometimes been breached, becoming an island for a time, and this may happen again. The northernmost part of nearby Blakeney was lost to the sea in the early Middle Ages, probably due to a storm. The spit is moving towards the mainland at about 1 m (1 yd) per year, and for the last two hundred years maps have been accurate enough for the encroachment of the sea to be quantified. Blakeney Chapel was 400 m (440 yd) from the sea in 1817, but this had reduced to 195 m (215 yd) by the end of the 20th century. The landward movement of the shingle means that the channel of the River Glaven becomes blocked increasingly often, leading to flooding of the reserve and Cley village. The Environment Agency considered several remedial options to protect these vulnerable areas, and a new route for the river to the south of its original line was completed in 2007 at a cost of about £1.5 million.

The Environment Agency's long-term policy is to hold the line only to protect communities and infrastructure, with managed retreat as the solution to rising sea levels elsewhere, even at sites like Cley where the financial benefits from the recreational value of the reserve outweigh the cost of maintaining the sea defences. A scheme to allow tidal flooding of part of the reserve has already been implemented at Titchwell Marsh.

Another strategy is to create new reserves inland. To compensate for the inevitable loss of the important reedbeds at Cley, the Environment Agency and the Norfolk Wildlife Trust have been working since 2010 to make a new wetland near Hilgay. The 60-hectare (150-acre) Hilgay Wetland Creation Project is converting former farmland into a variety of wetland habitats by using banks, ditches and a lake to manage water levels. The Trust sees this as the first stage of a long-term plan to create a roughly 10,000-hectare (25,000-acre) Wissey Living Landscape.

== Cited texts ==
- Allen, J R L; Pye, K (1992). Saltmarshes; morphodynamics, conservation and engineering significance. Cambridge: Cambridge University Press. ISBN 978-0-521-41841-6.
- Birks, Chris (2003). Report on an archaeological evaluation at Blakeney Freshes, Cley next the Sea: report No. 808 (PDF). Norwich: Norfolk Archaeological Unit.
- Bishop, Billy (1983). Cley Marsh and its birds. Woodbridge, Suffolk: Boydell Press. ISBN 0-85115-180-9.
- Brooks, Peter (2011). Cley. Cromer, Norfolk: Poppyland Books. ISBN 978-0-946148-92-9.
- Dorling Kindersley (2009). RSPB Where to go wild in Britain. London: Dorling Kindersley. ISBN 978-1-4053-3512-6.
- East Anglia Coastal Group (2010). North Norfolk shoreline management plan. Peterborough: Environment Agency.
- Elkins, Norman (1988). Weather and bird behaviour. Waterhouses, Staffordshire: Poyser. ISBN 0-85661-051-8.
- Fields, Nic (2006). Rome's Saxon Shore - coastal defences of Roman Britain AD 250-500 (Fortress 56). Oxford: Osprey Publishing. ISBN 978-1-84603-094-9.
- Gorski, Richard, ed. (2011). Roles of the sea in medieval England. Woodbridge, Suffolk: Boydell Press. ISBN 978-1-84383-701-5.
- Gray, J M (2004). Geodiversity: valuing and conserving abiotic nature. Edinburgh: Wiley-Blackwell. ISBN 0-470-84896-0.
- Hammomd, Nicholas, ed. (1984). RSPB nature reserves. Sandy, Beds: RSPB. ISBN 0-903138-12-3.
- Harrup, Simon; Redman, Nigel (2010). Where to watch birds in Britain. London: Christopher Helm. ISBN 978-1-4081-1059-1.
- Johnston, David E, ed. (1977). Research report No 18: The Saxon Shore. London: Council for British Archaeology. ISBN 0-900312-43-2.
- Labrum, E A (1993). Civil engineering heritage: Eastern and Central England (Civil Engineering Heritage Series). London: Thomas Telford. ISBN 0-7277-1970-X.
- Liley, D (2008). Development and the north Norfolk coast. Scoping document on the issues relating to access (PDF). Wareham, Dorset: Footprint Ecology. Archived from the original (PDF) on 6 April 2012.
- May, V J, ed. (2003). Geological Conservation Review: volume 28: Coastal geomorphology of Great Britain. Peterborough: Joint Nature Conservation Committee. ISBN 1-86107-484-0.
- Muir, Richard (2008). The lost villages of Britain. Stroud, Gloucestershire: The History Press Ltd. ISBN 978-0-7509-5039-8.
- Murphy, Peter (2009). The English coast: a history and a prospect. London: Continuum International Publishing. ISBN 978-1-84725-143-5.
- Natural England (2009). Holkham National Nature Reserve. Sheffield: Natural England. ISBN 978-1-84754-133-8. (automatic download).
- Net Gain (2011). Submission to Natural England & JNCC: Section 7.20 (Site Assessment Document) rRA 2a & rRA 2b, Seahorse Lagoon & Arnold's Marsh (PDF). Net Gain (The North Sea Marine Conservation Zones Project). Archived from the original (PDF) on 2 May 2012.
- Newton, Ian (2010). Bird migration: Collins New Naturalist Library (113). London: Collins. ISBN 978-0-00-730732-6.
- Norfolk Wildlife Trust (2005). NWT Cley and Salthouse Marshes Management Plan April 2005–March 2010. Norwich: Norfolk Wildlife Trust.
- Norfolk Wildlife Trust (2011). Norfolk Wildlife Trust Annual Report 2010/2011 (PDF). Norwich: Norfolk Wildlife Trust.
- Pevsner, Nikolaus; Wilson, Bill (2002). The Buildings Of England Norfolk I: Norwich and North-East Norfolk. New Haven and London: Yale University Press. ISBN 0-300-09607-0.
- Robertson, David; Crawley, Peter; Barker, Adam; Whitmore, Sandrine (2005). Norfolk Archaeological Unit Report No. 1045: Norfolk Rapid Coastal Zone Archaeological Survey (PDF). Norwich: Norfolk Archaeological Unit.
- Robinson, Bruce (1986). The Peddars Way and Norfolk Coast Path: Issue 13 of Long distance route guide. London: Her Majesty's Stationery Office. ISBN 0-11-701191-6.
- Robinson, Geoffey H (c. 2006). St Nicholas, Blakeney. Norwich: Geoffrey H Robinson.
- Rowley, Trevor (2006). The English Landscape in the Twentieth Century. London: Hambledon Continuum. ISBN 1-85285-388-3.
- Scott Wilson Ltd (2006). Tourism benefit & impacts analysis in the Norfolk coast Area of Outstanding Natu-ral Beauty (PDF). Norwich: Norfolk Coast Partnership. Archived from the original (PDF) on 7 February 2016.
- Shiel, Anna; Rayment, Matthew; Burton, Graham (2002). RSPB Reserves and Local Economies (PDF). Sandy, Beds: RSPB.
- Taylor, Marianne (2009). RSPB where to discover nature in Britain and Northern Ireland. London: Christopher Helm. ISBN 978-1-4081-0864-2.
- Turner, R K; Bateman, I J; Adger W N (2001). Economics of coastal and water resources: valuing environmental functions (Studies in ecological economics). London: Springer. ISBN 0-7923-6504-6.
