= Blakeney Chapel =

Ruined building on the North Norfolk coast of England

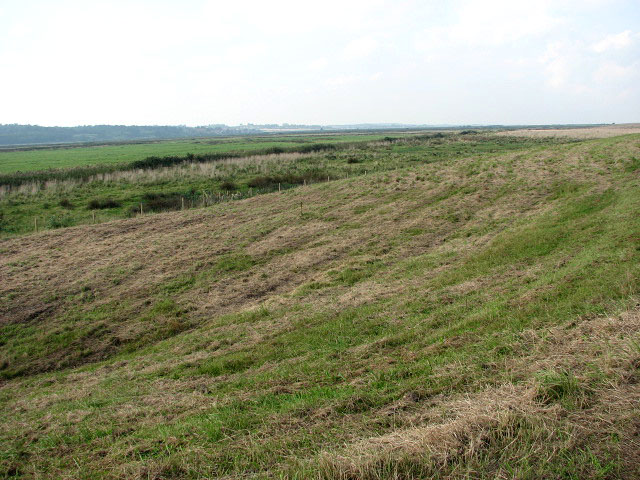
- No structures are now visible above ground at the site.

- Location within Norfolk

General information
- Location: Cley next the Sea, Norfolk, United Kingdom
- Coordinates: 52.9656°N 1.0420°E

Design and construction
- Designations: Scheduled monument; Grade II listed

Blakeney Chapel is a ruined building on the coast of North Norfolk, England. Despite its name, it was probably not a chapel, nor is it in the adjoining village of Blakeney, but rather in the parish of Cley next the Sea. The building stood on a raised mound or "eye" on the seaward end of the coastal marshes, less than 200 m (220 yd) from the sea and just to the north of the current channel of the River Glaven where it turns to run parallel to the shoreline. It consisted of two rectangular rooms of unequal size, and appears to be intact in a 1586 map, but is shown as ruins in later charts. Only the foundations and part of a wall still remain. Three archaeological investigations between 1998 and 2005 provided more detail of the construction, and showed two distinct periods of active use. Although it is described as a chapel on several maps, there is no documentary or archaeological evidence to suggest that it had any religious function. A small hearth, probably used for smelting iron, is the only evidence of a specific activity on the site.

Much of the structural material was long ago carried off for reuse in buildings in Cley and Blakeney. The surviving ruins are protected as a scheduled monument and Grade II listed building because of their historical importance, but there is no active management. The ever-present threat from the encroaching sea is likely to increase following a realignment of the Glaven's course through the marshes, and lead to the loss of the ruins.

== Description ==
Plan of the site; H is the old hearth, and F represents the later fireplaces, one of which is double. The dividing wall in S1 is also a late addition.

The Blakeney Chapel ruins consist of an east–west rectangular structure (S1) 18 m × 7 m (59 ft × 23 ft) in size with a smaller rectangular building (S2), 13 m × 5 m (43 ft × 16 ft) built onto the southern side of the main room. Most of the structure is buried; only a 6 m (20 ft) length of a flint and mortar wall was exposed to a height of 0.3 m (1 ft) prior to the excavation of 2004–05. The ruins stand on the highest point of Blakeney Eye at about 2 m (7 ft) above sea level. The Eye is a sandy mound in the marshes that is located inside the sea wall at the point where the River Glaven turns westward towards the sheltered inlet of Blakeney Haven. Cley Eye is a similar raised area on the east bank of the river. Despite the name, Blakeney Eye, like most of the northern part of the marshes in this area, is actually part of the parish of Cley next the Sea.

The land on which the building stands was owned by the Calthorpe family until its purchase by banker Charles Rothschild in 1912. Rothschild gave the property to the National Trust, which has managed it since. There is no public access to the site.

The ruins are protected as a scheduled monument and Grade II listed building because of their historical importance. These listings do not cover the land around them, but the whole of the marsh forms part of the 7,700-hectare (19,000-acre) North Norfolk Coast Site of Special Scientific Interest (SSSI) because of its internationally important wildlife value. The SSSI is now additionally protected through Natura 2000, Special Protection Area (SPA) and Ramsar listings, and is part of the Norfolk Coast Area of Outstanding Natural Beauty (AONB).

== Documented history ==
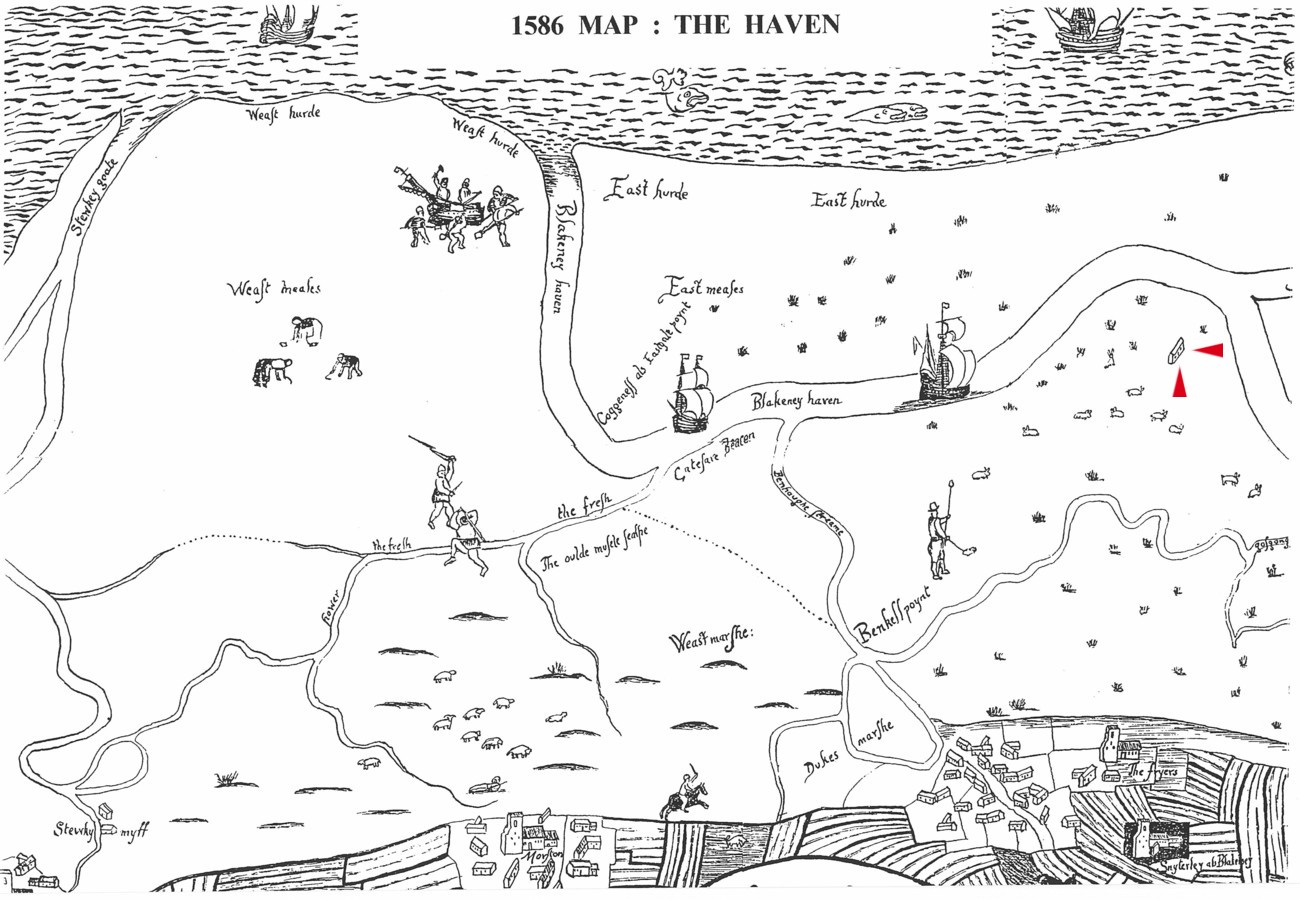
Extract from a 1586 map with the chapel indicated by added arrows. The village of Blakeney is at the lower right of the map, with Morston to the west (lower left). Cley is off the map extract, to the east of Blakeney.

The building was first shown on a 1586 map of the Blakeney and Cley area, apparently drawn to be used in evidence in a legal case regarding the rights to "wreck and salvage", the outcome of which is unknown. The original map disappeared in the 19th century, but a number of copies still exist. In this map, the building on the Eye is shown as intact and roofed, but it has no name. A map by the Cranefields from 1769 has the building as "Eye House", but by 1797 cartographer William Faden's map of Norfolk shows the "chapel ruins", a description that was then consistently used from the 19th century onwards. Some maps, including Faden's, show a second ruined chapel across the Glaven on Cley Eye, but no other documentation exists for that building.

The medieval churches of St Nicholas, Blakeney and St Margaret's, Cley, and the now ruined Blakeney friary, were not the first religious buildings in the area. An early church was recorded in the 1086 Domesday Book at Esnuterle ("Snitterley" was a former name for Blakeney, the current name first appearing in 1340), but the 11th-century church's location is unknown, and there is no reason to think that it is on the site of the 'chapel'.

An anonymous booklet on Blakeney published in 1929 states that there was a "chapel of ease" on the marshes, served by a friar from the Convent, but the document on which this seems to be based, a Calendar of Patent Rolls dated 20 April 1343, simply notes that a local hermit was given permission to seek alms in "divers parts of the realms". There is no evidence of a dedication of any religious building on the marshes, and no mention of a chapel in any surviving medieval documents.

== Investigations ==
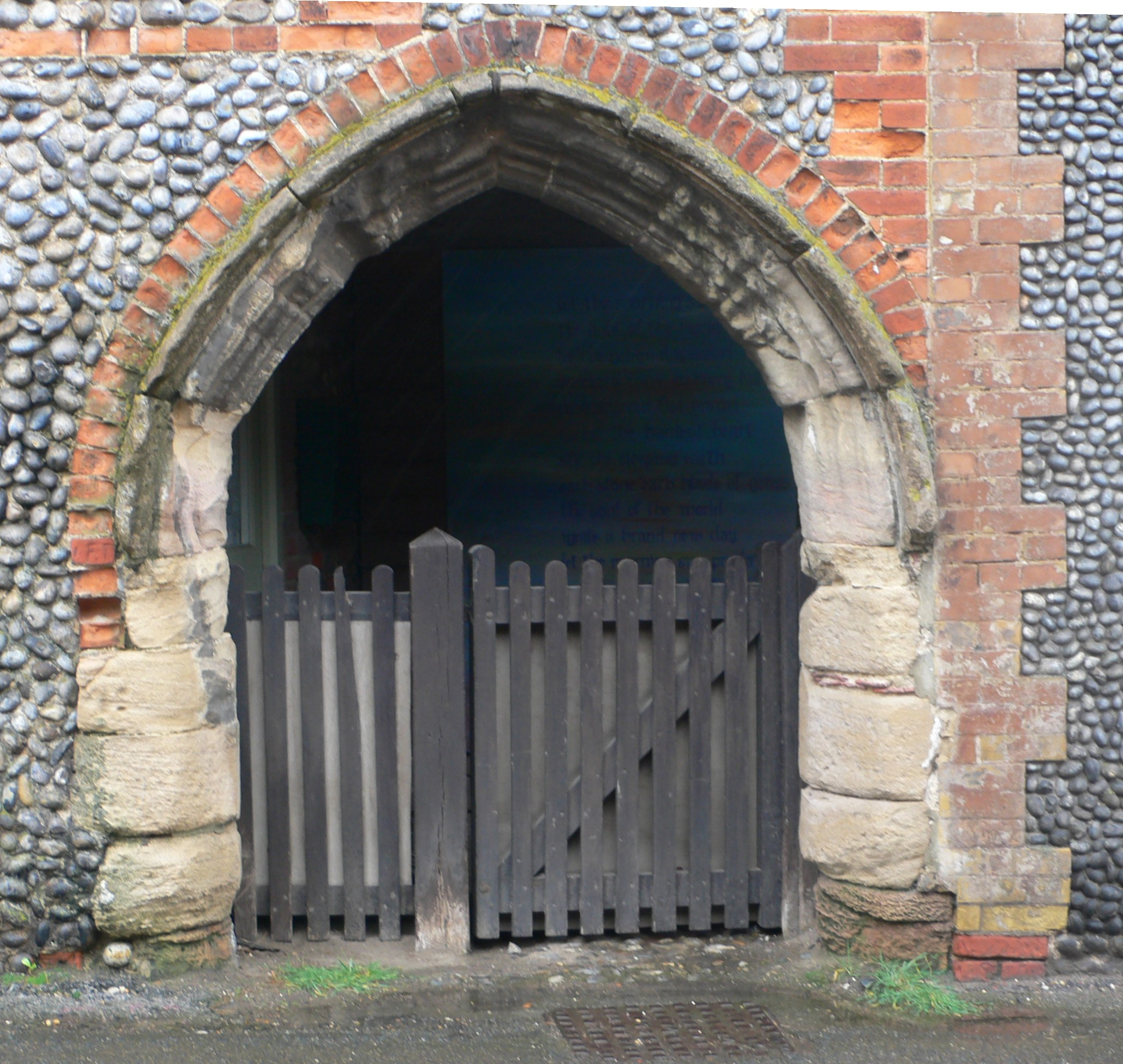
This arch in Cley is traditionally but mistakenly believed to have been once part of Blakeney Chapel. The wall is of the flint and mortar type typical of this area.

The first investigation of the chapel ruins, supported by the National Trust, was conducted by the local history group in the winter of 1998–99. This survey was conducted under a licence from English Heritage that allowed access but did not permit excavation, so it relied on height measurements, geophysics (resistivity, and magnetometry) and molehill sampling. The area surveyed was 100 m long and 40 m wide (109 yd by 44 yd). The magnetometry failed to detect the subterranean features of the chapel, but did show an unexpected linear anomaly, related to buried ironwork from wartime defences. The resistivity survey clearly showed the larger room, but barely detected the smaller, suggesting that it had less substantial foundations, was probably less well-constructed, and possibly later in date.

Plans for a realignment of the Glaven channel meant that the Eye would be left unprotected to the north of the river, and would eventually be destroyed by coastal change. It was decided that the only practical course of action was to investigate the site while it still existed, and a preliminary evaluation was carried out in 2003 in preparation for a full survey in 2004–05. The surveyed area covered 10 hectares (25 acres), significantly more than the 0.4 hectares (0.99 acres) of the 1998 investigations. 50 trenches were excavated in a herringbone pattern outside the buildings, each 50 m long and 1.8 m wide (164 ft by 6 ft), and six trenches of varying dimensions were created inside the chapel. These equated in total area to two of the standard trenches. The geology was investigated with eight boreholes, and geophysics (magnetometry and metal detection) were used to locate subsurface anomalies.

The major excavation of the site in the winter of 2004–05 concentrated on the building and a 10 m (33 ft) zone surrounding it. The results indicated that there were a number of phases of occupation. The remains of the building were reburied after excavation, so nothing is now visible at the surface.

== Archaeology ==
=== Early occupation ===
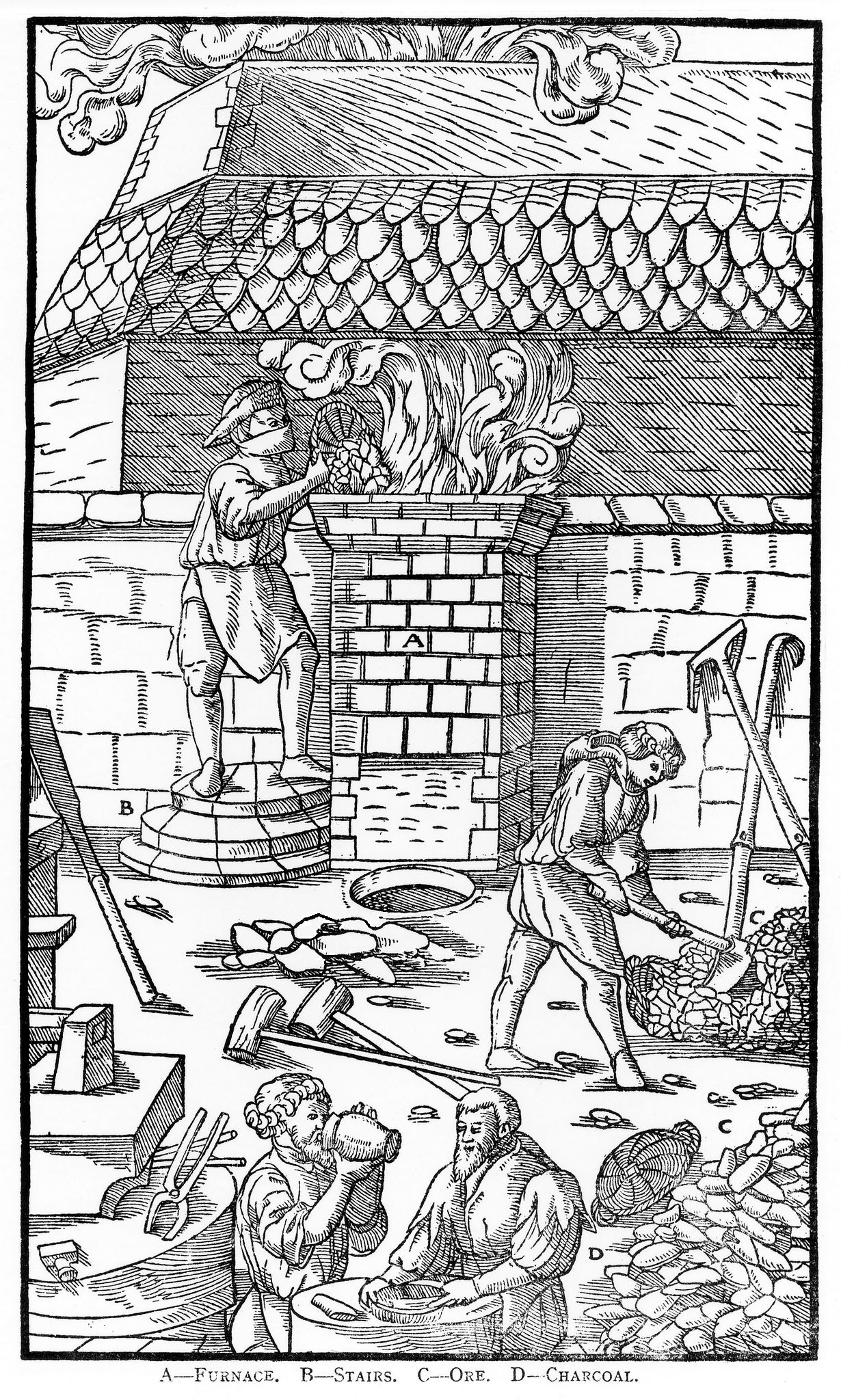
A medieval smelting hearth in action

The earliest evidence of permanent occupation is a series of ditches of 11th or 12th century date which are believed to have formed an enclosure, the south east corner of which lies below the "chapel". Evidence for any buildings within the enclosure has either been lost to the Glaven or is buried outside the survey area. Few finds were associated with the ditches, although some fragments of Roman or earlier pottery and three Henry III pennies were found nearby. As elsewhere on the site, there is little evidence to link the old pottery to its location when found. By the time of the construction of the main building, some time in the 14th century, the ditches had filled with sand. A small hearth was built at ground level, shortly before or during the erection of S1. It appears to have had fairly light use, but the presence of slag suggests that it was intended for smelting iron, perhaps by a smith. There was evidence for a number of small fires elsewhere in S1 at a similar date to the hearth, but whether they were related to the smelting is unknown. At this time, hearths could not melt metallic iron, but produced a 'bloom' (a mixture of iron and slag) which could be converted to wrought iron by repeated heating and hammering. Another, even earlier, smelting hearth is known from West Runton, 17 km (11 mi) further east on the Norfolk coast. The main ore in this area is the iron-rich local carrstone.

=== Medieval ===
The larger north building was built without deep foundation trenches, but was nevertheless a solid, well-built flint and mortar construction. The building had "substantial time and money spent on it" in the opinion of the principal archaeologist. The flints were selected to decrease in size as the walls rose, and the internal corners were decorated with limestone blocks set as quoins. Seashells were recovered, with a distribution suggesting that they were once part of the fabric of the building as galleting (strengthening for the mortar). There were entrances in the west and northeast walls, and some evidence that there were once windows in the northwest and south walls. The floor was compacted soil, and the original roof material is unknown, but the presence of a few glazed floor tiles and Flemish pantiles of a somewhat later date is consistent with a higher-status appearance. There was no internal wall at this date, but there may have been an external wooden extension to the southwest corner.

The medieval building was eventually abandoned, and much of the structural material was taken for reuse in Blakeney and Cley villages. A stone archway in Cley is traditionally believed to have come from the chapel, and would fit the western entrance, although it could have been brought from elsewhere such as the ruined Blakeney friary. The 'chapel' building was deserted around 1600, but whether the collapse of its east end was the cause or a consequence of its disuse is unknown. The main building seems to have suffered a major fire at some stage, and no wooden structures have been found. The site was flooded at least three times, subsequent to the building's collapse. At some stage, part of the western wall was lost, the steep slope where it stood suggesting that it may have been taken by the sea.

Most of the pottery found within the larger room was 14th to 16th century; nearly a third of this was imported from the continent, reflecting the Glaven ports' importance in international trade at that time. The pottery appeared to be mainly domestic in nature, including jugs and cooking vessels.

=== Post-medieval ===
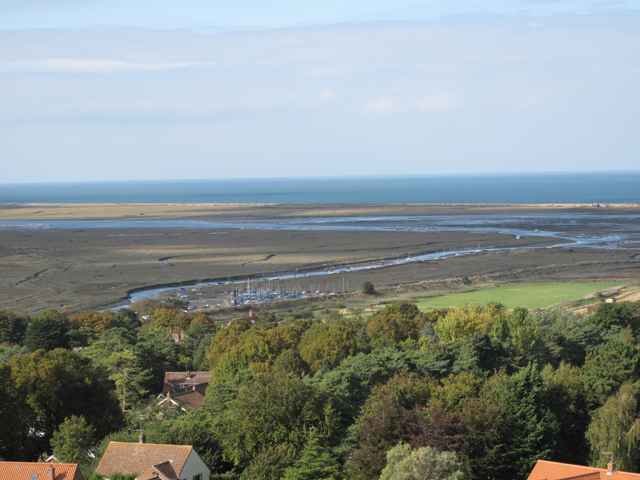
View of the Glaven's present course through the salt marshes, with the old channel and the shingle spit in the distance

The 17th-century room, S2, used the south wall of the existing structure as its own north wall, and was largely built using materials salvaged from S1, although the standard of the work was poorer. The new room had a double fireplace, but there was no evidence of a dividing wall between the two hearths. Limestone blocks, identical to the quoins in S1, were used as structural and decorative features in the fireplace. In addition to the pantiles taken from S1, there were Cornish slate roof tiles. Whether they formed part of the roof of S2 or were associated with the possible wooden extension is unclear.

At the same time that S2 was built, a dividing wall, again of inferior quality, was built across S1 to create a western room. There were no molehills within the smaller building, which had suggested that, unlike its neighbour, it has a buried solid floor, and this was confirmed by excavation. The floor was originally made of mortar, relaid at least once, but then covered with a layer of flint cobbles, suggesting that it was a working area. The old hearth was not covered, so it may have still been used. A new fireplace was also added, apparently of a domestic design, although the context makes that function improbable. A well-marked track led southwest down the slope from S1, and a large midden was close to the path. It has been suggested that a "clean" pit north of S1 was a well, with fresh water floating above the saltwater below, a phenomenon known from Blakeney Point and elsewhere on the Norfolk coast.

There is only limited evidence for use after the 17th-century desertion, including a 19th-century tobacco pipe and some Victorian glassware. A wartime barbed wire fence ran through the ruins, and was detected by excavation and magnetometry. Other modern finds included a gin trap, bullets and other small metal objects.

== Purpose ==
Blakeney Eye has a long history of occupation, with many finds from the Neolithic, but few from Roman or Anglo-Saxon dates, although a gold bracteate was a rare and significant 6th-century find. Animal and plant finds showed that both domesticated species, such as goats, and locally available prey such as curlews were eaten; rabbit and canid remains may reflect the use of fur from these mammals. Evidence of cereal processing and storage is difficult to date, but may be medieval.

The buildings were abandoned during the 17th century, and their uses, which may have been varied over the long period of occupation, remain unknown. The east–west orientation and superior workmanship of S1 would not preclude religious use, but there is no other evidence, archaeological or documentary, to support that possibility. The limited number of finds, even of material which could not have been reused, have suggested that any medieval habitation must have been very limited in numbers of people and time. Other plausible uses have been suggested, such as a custom house or a warrener's house, but again there is nothing to support these speculations.

== Threats ==
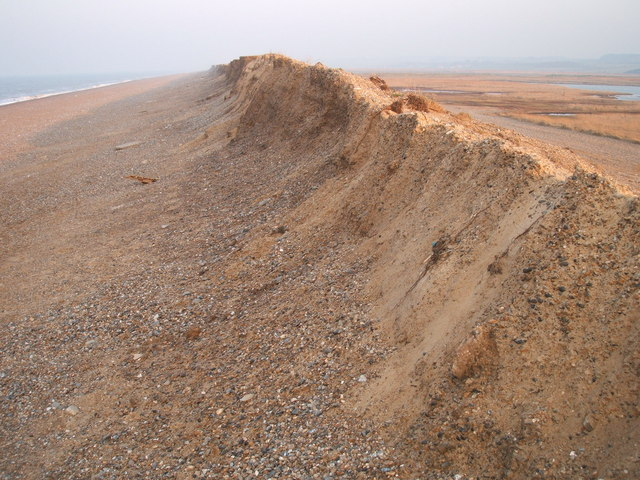
The shingle ridge is moving southwards through the marshes.

Realignment of the River Glaven means the ruins are now to the north of the river embankment, and essentially unprotected from coastal erosion, since the advancing shingle will no longer be swept away by the stream. The chapel will be buried by a ridge of shingle as the spit continues to move south, and then lost to the sea, perhaps within 20–30 years (by 2035).

The ridge of shingle runs west from Weybourne along the Norfolk coast, before becoming a spit extending into the sea at Blakeney. Saltmarshes can develop behind the ridge, but the sea attacks the spit through tidal and storm action. The amount of shingle moved by a single storm can be "spectacular"; the spit has sometimes been breached, becoming an island for a time, and this may happen again. The northernmost part of Snitterley village was lost to the sea in the early Middle Ages, probably due to a storm.

In the last two hundred years, the maps have been accurate enough for the distance from the ruins to the sea to be measured. The 400 m (440 yd) in 1817 had become 320 m (350 yd) by 1835, 275 m (301 yd) in 1907, and 195 m (213 yd) by the end of the 20th century. The spit is moving towards the mainland at about 1 m (1.1 yd) per year; and several raised islands or "eyes" have already been lost to the sea as the beach has rolled over the saltmarsh. Landward movement of the shingle meant that the channel of the Glaven, itself excavated in 1922 because an earlier, more northerly course was overwhelmed between Blakeney and Cley, was becoming blocked increasingly often. This led to flooding of Cley village and the environmentally important freshwater marshes. The Environment Agency considered a number of remedial options. Attempting to hold back the shingle or breaching the spit to create a new outlet for the Glaven would be expensive and probably ineffective, and doing nothing would be environmentally damaging. The Agency decided to create a new route for the river to the south of its original line, and work to realign a 550 m (600 yd) stretch of river 200 m (220 yd) further south was completed in 2007 at a cost of about £1.5 million.

Managed retreat is likely to be the long-term solution to rising sea levels along much of the North Norfolk coast. It has already been implemented at other important sites like Titchwell Marsh.

== Cited texts ==
- Bines, Tim (2000). Wash and North Norfolk Coast – European marine site (PDF). Peterborough: English Nature. Archived from the original (PDF) on 7 March 2016.
- Birks, Chris (2003). Report on an archaeological evaluation at Blakeney Freshes, Cley next the Sea: report No. 808. Norwich: Norfolk Archaeological Unit.
- Blair, W John; Ramsay, Nigel L (1991). English Medieval Industries: Craftsmen, Techniques, Products. Winchester: Hambledon Press. ISBN 0-907628-87-7.
- Gray, J M (2004). Geodiversity: valuing and conserving abiotic nature. Edinburgh: Wiley-Blackwell. ISBN 0-470-84896-0.
- Hinde, Thomas (1996). The Domesday Book, England's heritage, then and now. Canterbury: Tiger Books. ISBN 1-85833-440-3.
- Holt-Wilson, Tim (2010). Norfolk's Earth Heritage: Valuing Our Geodiversity (PDF). Norwich: Norfolk Geodiversity Partnership. ISBN 978-1-84754-216-8. Archived from the original (PDF) on 3 March 2016.
- May, V J (2003). Geological Conservation Review: volume 28: Coastal geomorphology of Great Britain. Peterborough: Joint Nature Conservation Committee. ISBN 1-86107-484-0.
- Muir, Richard (2008). The lost villages of Britain. Stroud, Gloucestershire: The History Press Ltd. ISBN 978-0-7509-5039-8.
- Murphy, Peter (2005). Coastal archaeology: managing the resource. Dereham, Norfolk: East of England Archaeology.
- Pethick, John; Cottle, Richard (2003). Coastal Habitat Management Plan: Final Report (PDF). Peterborough: English Nature and Environment Agency.
- Pevsner, Nikolaus; Wilson, Bill (2002). The buildings of England Norfolk I: Norwich and North-East Norfolk. New Haven and London: Yale University Press. ISBN 0-300-09607-0.
- Robinson, Geoffey H (c. 2006). St Nicholas, Blakeney. Norwich: Geoffrey H Robinson.
- Vince, Alan; Young, Jane (2005). Assessment of the pottery from Blakeney, Norfolk (PDF). Lincoln: Alan Vince Archaeology Consultancy.
