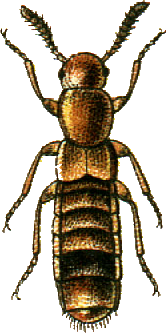

Scientific classification
- Kingdom: Animalia
- Phylum: Arthropoda
- Clade: Pancrustacea
- Class: Insecta
- Order: Coleoptera
- Suborder: Polyphaga
- Infraorder: Staphyliniformia
- Family: Staphylinidae
- Genus: Phytosus
- Species: P. nigriventris

Binomial name
- Phytosus nigriventris (Chevrolat, 1843)

= Phytosus nigriventris =

Species of beetle

Phytosus nigriventris is a species of rove beetle in the family Staphylinidae.
