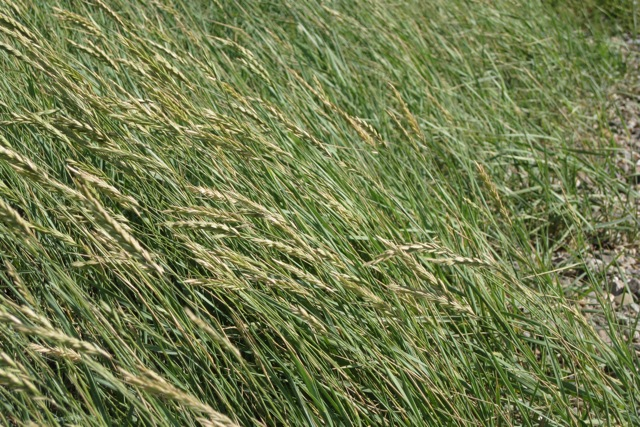

Scientific classification
- Kingdom: Plantae
- Clade: Tracheophytes
- Clade: Angiosperms
- Clade: Monocots
- Clade: Commelinids
- Order: Poales
- Family: Poaceae
- Subfamily: Pooideae
- Genus: Elymus
- Species: E. pungens

Binomial name
- Elymus pungens (Pers.) Melderis

Synonyms
- Agropyron pungens (Pers.) Roem. & Schult.; Braconotia pungens (Pers.) Godr.; Elytrigia pungens (Pers.) Tutin; Psammopyrum pungens (Pers.) Á.Löve; Thinopyrum pungens (Pers.) Barkworth; Triticum pungens Pers.

= Elymus pungens =

Species of grass

Elymus pungens, the sea couch grass, is a species of grass of the genus Elymus in the family Poaceae. It is a common grass species native to Europe and Asia. Elymus pungens is typically found in sandy, and saline environments and can tolerate harsh weather conditions; because of this it is a common pioneer species typically associated with sand dunes.
