= Winterton =

Winterton may refer to:

== Places ==
=== England ===
- Winterton, Lincolnshire, a small town in North Lincolnshire, England
- Winterton Hospital in County Durham
- in Norfolk:
  - Winterton Dunes, a nature reserve
  - Winterton Ness, an area of foreland on the North Norfolk coast of England.
  - Winterton-on-Sea, a village and civil parish
    - location of Winterton Lighthouse

=== Canada ===
- Winterton, Newfoundland and Labrador, a town in the Canadian province of Newfoundland and Labrador

=== South Africa ===
- Winterton, KwaZulu-Natal, a small town in KwaZulu-Natal

=== United States ===
- Winterton, former name of Altaville, California
- Winterton, New York, a town in Sullivan County, New York, United States

== People ==
- Winterton (surname)

== Other ==
- Earl Winterton, a title in the Peerage of Ireland
- HMS Coromandel (1795), a ship formerly the East Indiaman Winterton
