= Winterton-on-Sea =

Village in Norfolk, England

Coordinates: 52.714°N 1.682°E

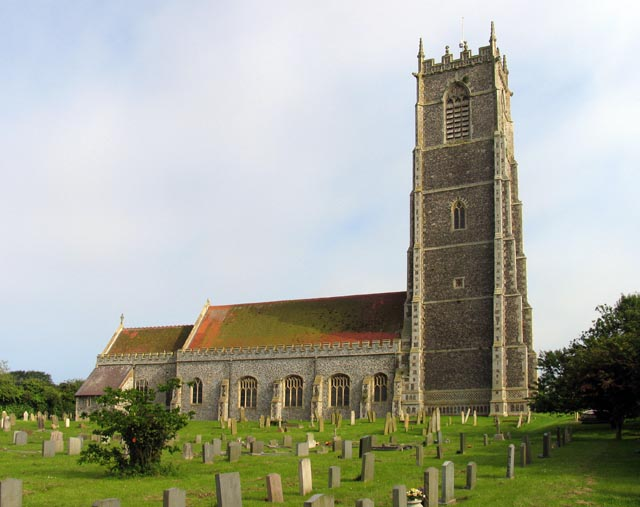
- The Church of the Holy Trinity & All Saints

- Location within Norfolk
- Area: 5.70 km^{2} (2.20 sq mi)
- Population: 1,278 (2011)
  - Density: 224/km^{2} (580/sq mi)
- OS grid reference: TG488193
- Civil parish: Winterton-on-Sea
- District: Great Yarmouth
- Shire county: Norfolk
- Region: East
- Country: England
- Sovereign state: United Kingdom
- Post town: GREAT YARMOUTH
- Postcode district: NR29
- Dialling code: 01493
- Police: Norfolk
- Fire: Norfolk
- Ambulance: East of England
- UK Parliament: Great Yarmouth

Winterton-on-Sea is a village and civil parish on the North Sea coast of the English county Norfolk. It is 8 miles (13 km) north of Great Yarmouth and 19 miles (31 km) east of Norwich.

The civil parish has an area of 2.2 square miles (5.7 km^{2}) and at the 2001 census had a population of 1,359 in 589 households. Winterton-on-Sea borders the villages Hemsby, Horsey and Somerton. For the purposes of local government, the parish falls within the district of Great Yarmouth.

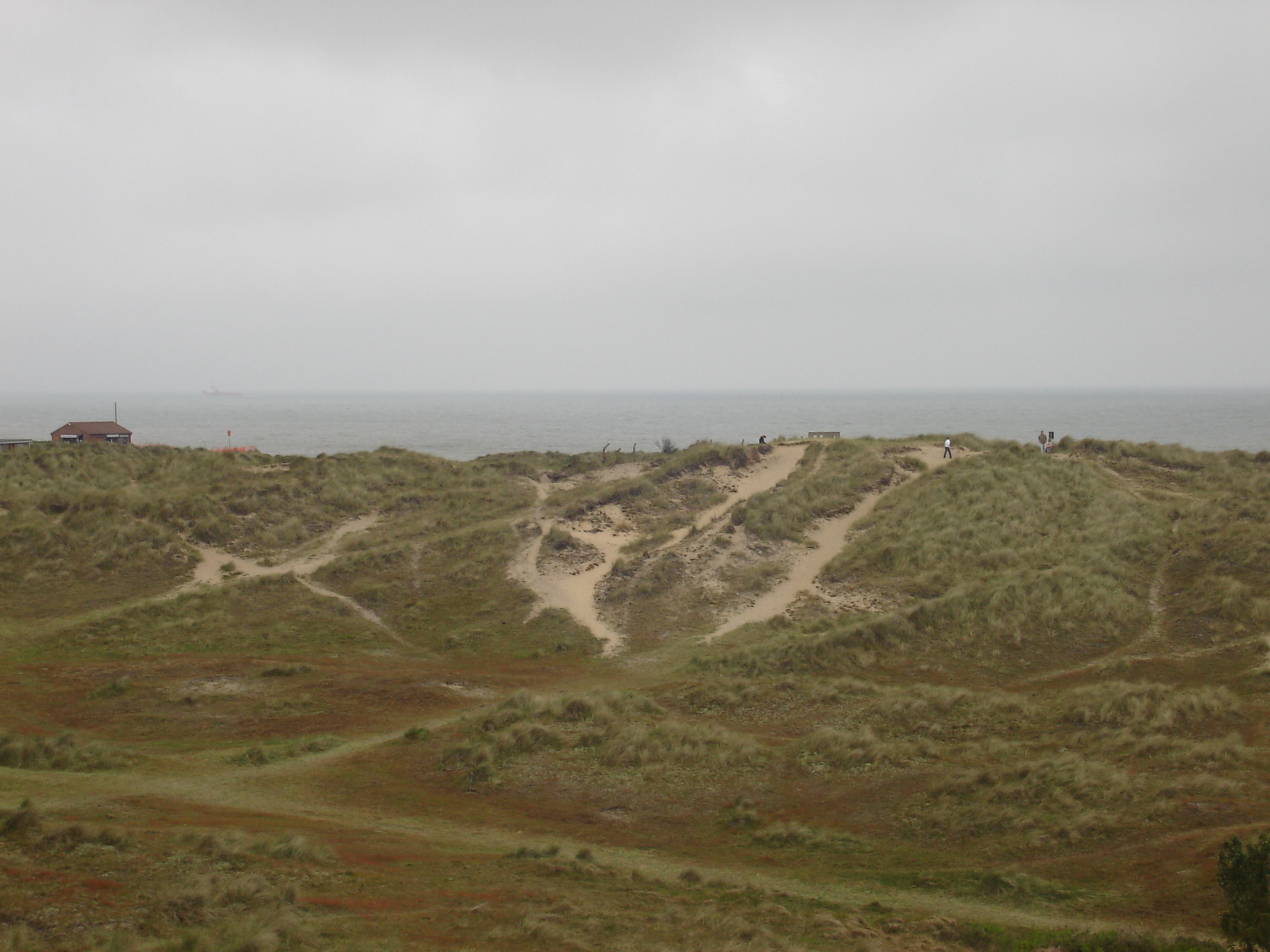
Winterton Dunes

Between the village and the North Sea are Winterton Dunes which include a 109 hectares (270 acres) National Nature Reserve and are inhabited by several notable species such as the natterjack toad.

Winterton and neighbouring beach Horsey are major wildlife sites, even over the winter. During the months of November to January, a colony of Atlantic Grey Seals heads on to the beach to give birth to seal pups. This has been described as "one of Britain’s greatest wildlife spectacles" and attracts tourists from all over the country.

== Winterton as a resort ==
The village has been described as "a very pleasant place to spend a holiday" and "one of the great natural beauty-spots of Norfolk". The coast near the village has a sandy beach. The village has a mini-market called Loomes Stores, a fish and chip shop, The Hermanus Hotel which contains The Highwayman bar and restaurant, a pub named The Fisherman's Return, a post office with its own tea room, and a café by the beach named Seal View. It has received awards on several occasions in the Anglia in Bloom competition.

== History ==
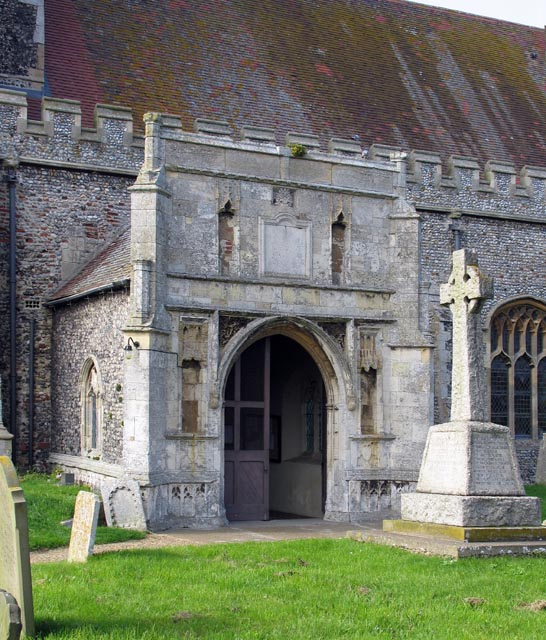
The church porch

The parish was created in 967CE, and a church was established here during the Anglo-Saxon period. The current church, Holy Trinity and All Saints, mostly dates back to the 16th century and its tower is 132 feet (40 m) tall. The lean-to chapel north of the chancel is from the 13th century and could have been an anchorite's cell but is more likely to have been an early example of a vestry or sacristy. The porch dates from about 1459.

Some historians believe that the village was the seasonal "tun", meaning settlement, of farmers from East Somerton who were fishermen during the winter. By Norman times it had become a separate village and is recorded in the Domesday Book of 1086 as Wintretona or Wintretuna.

The Fisherman's Return, a brick and flint public house, dates from the end of the 17th century. A glossy black erratic boulder "the size of a large pig" is located in The Lane close to the junction with Black Street. The stone was moved in 1931, this led to riots as the move was deemed responsible for poor fishing. In the following year it was moved to its present location.

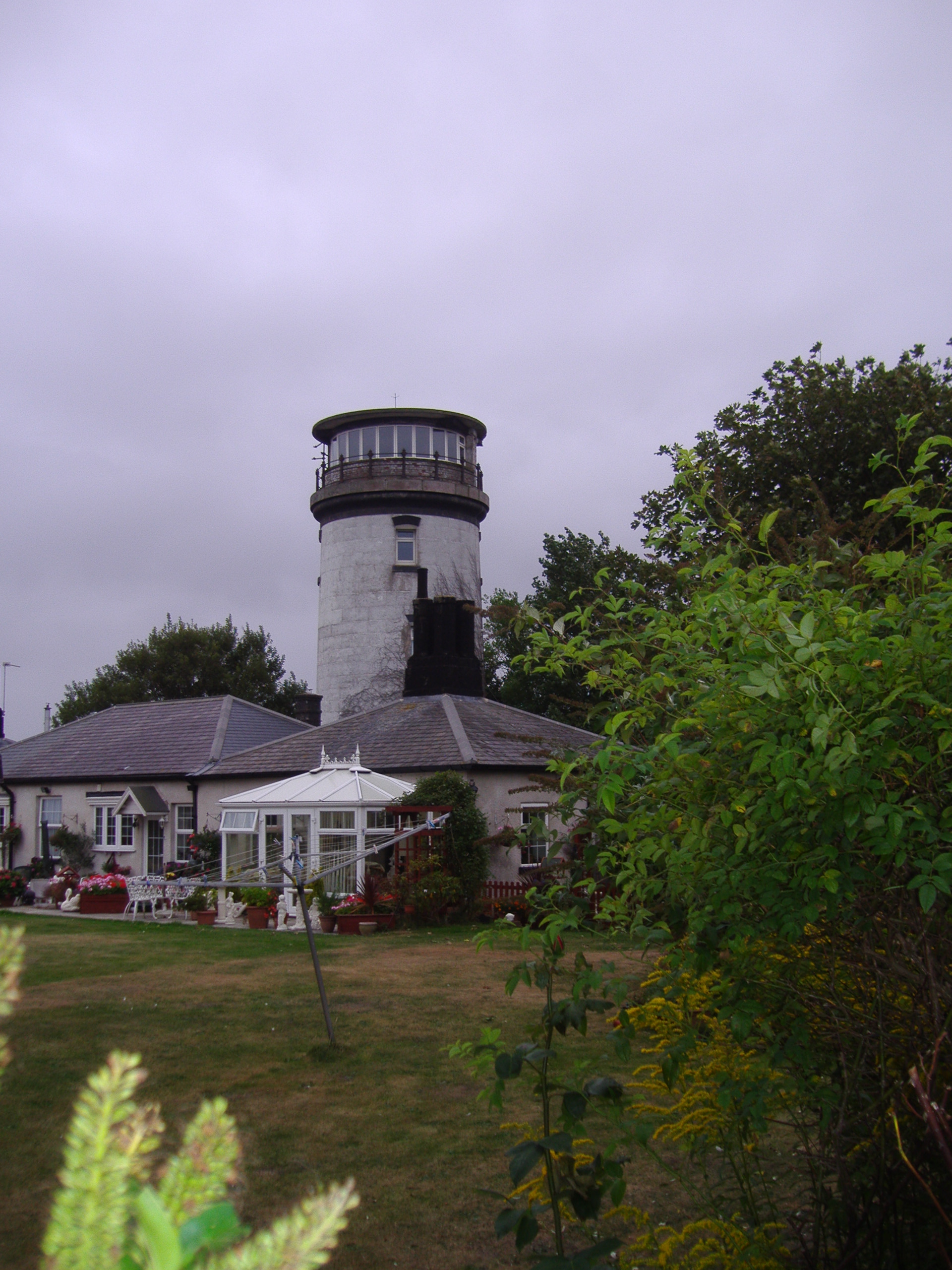
The old lighthouse

The hazardous nature of the coastline at Winterton is indicated by Winterton Lighthouse which was established during the 17th century and operated until the early 20th century. In the late 18th century marram grass was planted to stabilise the coastline against sea encroachments, and by the early 19th century there was a barrier of dunes between high water mark and the ridge on which the lighthouse stood, leaving a valley between.

During World War II, anti-invasion defences were constructed around Winterton-on-Sea. They included a number of pillboxes. The beaches were protected with unusually extensive barriers of scaffolding and large numbers of anti-tank cubes.

Between 1851 and 1861 a number of Winterton families migrated south to Caister-on-Sea. Many of those families joined the Caister Beachmen and founded arguably the basis of the modern Lifeboat service. The most notable of these men was James Haylett.

Edward Fawcett was a Winterton fisherman who joined the Royal Navy. He sailed with Captain James Clark Ross on HMS Erebus's exploration of the Antarctic as boatswain's mate. He was not on Erebus when it made its fatal Arctic voyage under Sir John Franklin, but took part in one of the attempted rescues in HMS Investigator as part of the McClure Arctic Expedition and was in the first group of people to travel through the North West Passage. The crew of Investigator were trapped for three years in the pack ice before making contact via sledging expeditions with HMS Resolute and abandoning their ship. Resolute was in turn also trapped in the ice and abandoned, and the survivors marched across the ice to Beechey Island from where other ships returned them home. Fawcett spent his retirement in Winterton.

== Art and literature ==
Daniel Defoe mentions the village in Robinson Crusoe and A tour thro' the whole island of Great Britain, published in 1719 and from 1724 respectively. In 1864 the novelist Wilkie Collins visited the village while preparing Armadale, and met nineteen-year-old Martha Rudd who became his unmarried partner. They had three children together. He was an admirer of Defoe and in particular of Robinson Crusoe, which is referred to many times in his subsequent novel The Moonstone, and wanted to explore the area where the character was initially shipwrecked.

The author and communist Sylvia Townsend Warner, one of the Bright Young Things of the 1920s, frequently stayed with Valentine Ackland at Hill House and they both wrote poetry inspired by the Winterton beach and dunes. Between the mid-1950s and the early 1970s Leslie Davenport, a member of the Norwich Twenty Group of painters, led up to 200 artists, writers and musicians living on the beach and dunes for six weeks every summer.

In 1956, at 78 years old, the fisherman Sam Larner was discovered as a folk singer in the village. His performances were often broadcast, he performed at music venues in London, and a record was published. There is a blue plaque on his cottage. The 1977 film Julia includes scenes filmed in the village.

== See also ==
- Winterton Ness
- Winterton Lifeboat Station
- Blood Hill wind farm
