= Hemsby =

Village in Norfolk, England

Coordinates: 52.69764°N 1.69115°E

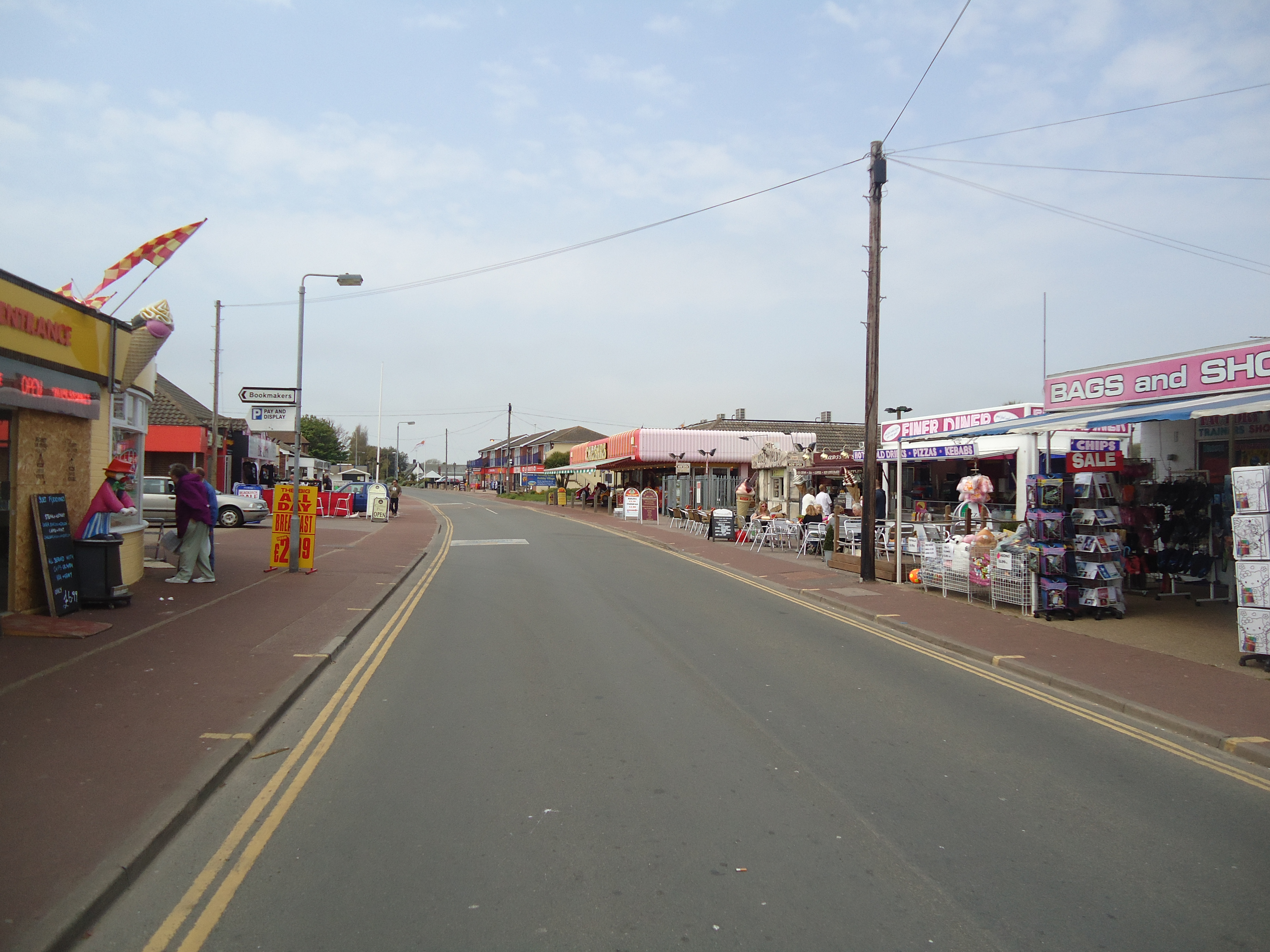
- Beach Road, Hemsby

- Location within Norfolk
- Area: 7.14 km^{2} (2.76 sq mi)
- Population: 3,275 (2011)
  - Density: 459/km^{2} (1,190/sq mi)
- OS grid reference: TG495175
- Civil parish: Hemsby
- District: Great Yarmouth
- Shire county: Norfolk
- Region: East
- Country: England
- Sovereign state: United Kingdom
- Post town: GREAT YARMOUTH
- Postcode district: NR29
- Dialling code: 01493
- Police: Norfolk
- Fire: Norfolk
- Ambulance: East of England
- UK Parliament: Great Yarmouth

Hemsby is a coastal village and civil parish in the Borough of Great Yarmouth in Norfolk, England. It is situated 8 mi (13 km) north-west of the town of Great Yarmouth.

In the 2001 census Hemsby had a population of 2,973 in 1,221 households; by the 2011 census it had increased to 3,275. Hemsby borders the villages of Winterton-on-Sea and Scratby. For the purpose of local government, the parish is in the district of Great Yarmouth.

Coastal erosion is destroying a number of homes and others are threatened. A Norfolk county map dated around 1610 shows a headland, called Winterton Ness, extending into the sea north-east of Hemsby. This headland has now almost entirely disappeared through erosion.

The village's name means "Hemer's farm/settlement".

Hemsby, along with much of the Norfolk coast, was targeted by the Vikings, who initially raided the area in search of precious materials and slaves. The village was founded at some point during this time. The settlement grew steadily and is listed in the Domesday Book of 1086 under the name of Haimesbei with a description of "a hamlet covering 43 meadow acres with 50 households, 3 slaves, 2 salt pans and 160 sheep".

== The village ==
=== Beaches ===
In late February 2023, the beaches experienced another bout of severe erosion. Access has become so limited that as of 27 February, the lifeboat cannot launch. The beaches were one of the major tourist draws in the village, with miles of sandy coastline. Large sand dunes form a natural barrier between the beach and the village behind it. One of the more unusual features of the beach is a scattering of anti-tank blocks across the beach, and a concrete bunker, left over from the World War II coastline defences. These were cast by the Royal Engineers as tank defences; the platoon sergeant was Owen (Tom) Hanbury who settled in Hemsby.

Erosion is a major problem in the surrounding villages of Winterton-on-Sea and Caister where sandy cliffs are being destroyed by the forces of the sea. Hemsby's dunes are also being eroded; previously the wide beach had made the effect less noticeable, but the rate of erosion has increased significantly in the past two years, threatening homes, the local lifeboat station and the village's tourist industry. In 2013 a campaign was started to save Hemsby Beach: 'DIY' sea defences are being built to try to stem the erosion.

=== Hemsby Village ===
Hemsby is split into two parts: Hemsby Village and Hemsby Beach. Hemsby Village is mainly the residential area, about a mile inland. Kingsway is an area of the village which includes a Co-op shop, hairdressers and a Chinese restaurant. This is also the main location for buses into Great Yarmouth and Martham. St Mary the Virgin Church was built in the 12th century and is a landmark in the village. The Scroby Sands wind farm was built in 2003 and is clearly visible from the village and the beach. The Blood Hill wind farm is also near the village in Winterton. The Met Office operated the Hemsby meteorological station (WMO ID: 03496) from 1948 to 2001. The site hosted a suite of surface and upper observations (including radiosonde), and an Upper Air Training School during this period.

=== Hemsby Beach ===
The tourist-based part of the village lies along Beach Road and is commonly known as Hemsby Beach. It features funfairs, crazy golf courses and children's rides. The beach end of the road has cafes, shops, amusement arcades and a pub, while at the upper end are houses and accommodation parks, consisting mainly of chalets and caravans.

Herbert Potter purchased land in Hemsby; this was the original site of the first permanent and mixed-use holiday camp in the United Kingdom, Potters Resort. The holiday camp opened in 1920 with wooden huts as standard. The camp was moved down the coast to Hopton-on-Sea in 1924, and the original site was sold.

The largest of the accommodation parks was a branch of Pontins, but this closed in 2009.

=== Former Pontins holiday camp ===
For many years, there were two holiday camps, Seacroft holiday camp on the north side of Beach Road and Maddisons Camp on the south side of Beach Road. There was friendly rivalry and football matches held and overall brought prosperity to the village. Both were bought by Fred Pontin.

The original 9-acre holiday camp was opened in 1920 by Harry Maddison, and run by his family until 1971. Pontins replaced the wooden chalets with new apartment-style pre-cast concrete accommodation blocks. At its peak, the camp of 22 acres had four single-storey chalet blocks and 44 two-storey chalet blocks, providing 512 individual chalets in three grades that could accommodate up to 2,440 holidaymakers and 50 onsite staff beds. The 50 onsite buildings provided: a reception and information centre; an amusement arcade; a fast food outlet; a play area; an entertainment hall seating 1,700; a smaller hall accommodating 800 and a shop; an indoor swimming pool; a pub; and snooker rooms. Outside facilities included tennis courts, an adventure playground and a go-karting track. In January 2009, following five years of declining bookings and after a review from Pontins' new owners Ocean Parks, Pontins gave staff 48 hours notice of closure of the site. Sold together with the Blackpool camp to developer Northern Trust, it has been subject to multiple development proposals in the period since, none of which have progressed to planning.

=== December 2013 storm ===
Seven cliff-top homes were destroyed when cliffs collapsed in a storm surge caused by Cyclone Bodil.

=== The future ===
Following Pontins' closure in 2009, Hemsby's traders started a fight-back to prosperity by engaging brand expert Simon Middleton, known as "the Brand Strategy Guru", to re-invigorate the resort's image. Focusing on the village's Viking origins, Middleton proposed a new strapline for the resort, "1200 years of seaside fun", with an accompanying logo showing a laughing Viking brandishing a bucket and spade. The Viking theme was continued with the announcement of Norfolk's first Viking Festival held in June. The festival included a Viking encampment and re-enactments of battles, as well as a Scandinavian market and music. Benny Andersson, formerly of ABBA, was invited to perform at the festival, and to judge an ABBA tribute band competition.

Hemsby received further attention from the media and from politicians when plans were announced for an "Eden of the East" project involving an eco-tourism park based on the old Pontins' site. The project, designed to be environmentally friendly, will provide revolutionary 'open air' camping all-year-round inside giant geodesic domes.

== Climate ==
Climate data for Hemsby (1991–2020)
| Month | Jan | Feb | Mar | Apr | May | Jun | Jul | Aug | Sep | Oct | Nov | Dec | Year |
|---|---|---|---|---|---|---|---|---|---|---|---|---|---|
| Record high °C (°F) | 14.0 (57.2) | 16.7 (62.1) | 21.1 (70.0) | 23.8 (74.8) | 26.2 (79.2) | 31.5 (88.7) | 31.9 (89.4) | 31.2 (88.2) | 26.8 (80.2) | 24.8 (76.6) | 17.9 (64.2) | 15.5 (59.9) | 31.9 (89.4) |
| Mean daily maximum °C (°F) | 7.4 (45.3) | 7.8 (46.0) | 9.9 (49.8) | 12.7 (54.9) | 15.6 (60.1) | 18.6 (65.5) | 20.8 (69.4) | 21.1 (70.0) | 18.6 (65.5) | 14.8 (58.6) | 10.7 (51.3) | 8.0 (46.4) | 13.9 (57.0) |
| Daily mean °C (°F) | 4.9 (40.8) | 5.0 (41.0) | 6.7 (44.1) | 9.1 (48.4) | 12.0 (53.6) | 14.7 (58.5) | 16.9 (62.4) | 17.1 (62.8) | 15.1 (59.2) | 11.7 (53.1) | 7.9 (46.2) | 5.4 (41.7) | 10.6 (51.1) |
| Mean daily minimum °C (°F) | 2.3 (36.1) | 2.1 (35.8) | 3.4 (38.1) | 5.5 (41.9) | 8.3 (46.9) | 10.9 (51.6) | 13.1 (55.6) | 13.2 (55.8) | 11.6 (52.9) | 8.6 (47.5) | 5.0 (41.0) | 2.9 (37.2) | 7.3 (45.1) |
| Record low °C (°F) | −14.1 (6.6) | −9.1 (15.6) | −4.3 (24.3) | −1.9 (28.6) | −1.5 (29.3) | 2.5 (36.5) | 5.6 (42.1) | 5.6 (42.1) | 1.3 (34.3) | −3.0 (26.6) | −4.7 (23.5) | −7.9 (17.8) | −14.1 (6.6) |
| Average precipitation mm (inches) | 50.5 (1.99) | 43.9 (1.73) | 42.6 (1.68) | 32.0 (1.26) | 43.3 (1.70) | 53.7 (2.11) | 61.6 (2.43) | 68.8 (2.71) | 52.7 (2.07) | 65.4 (2.57) | 70.0 (2.76) | 62.6 (2.46) | 647.3 (25.48) |
| Average precipitation days (≥ 1.0 mm) | 10.9 | 9.9 | 8.9 | 8.3 | 7.7 | 8.9 | 8.9 | 9.2 | 8.7 | 10.9 | 12.2 | 12.0 | 116.5 |
| Mean monthly sunshine hours | 65.7 | 84.5 | 127.2 | 189.7 | 226.2 | 225.3 | 228.7 | 211.8 | 153.0 | 114.4 | 76.9 | 59.7 | 1,763.1 |
Source 1: Met Office
Source 2: Starlings Roost Weather

== Gallery ==
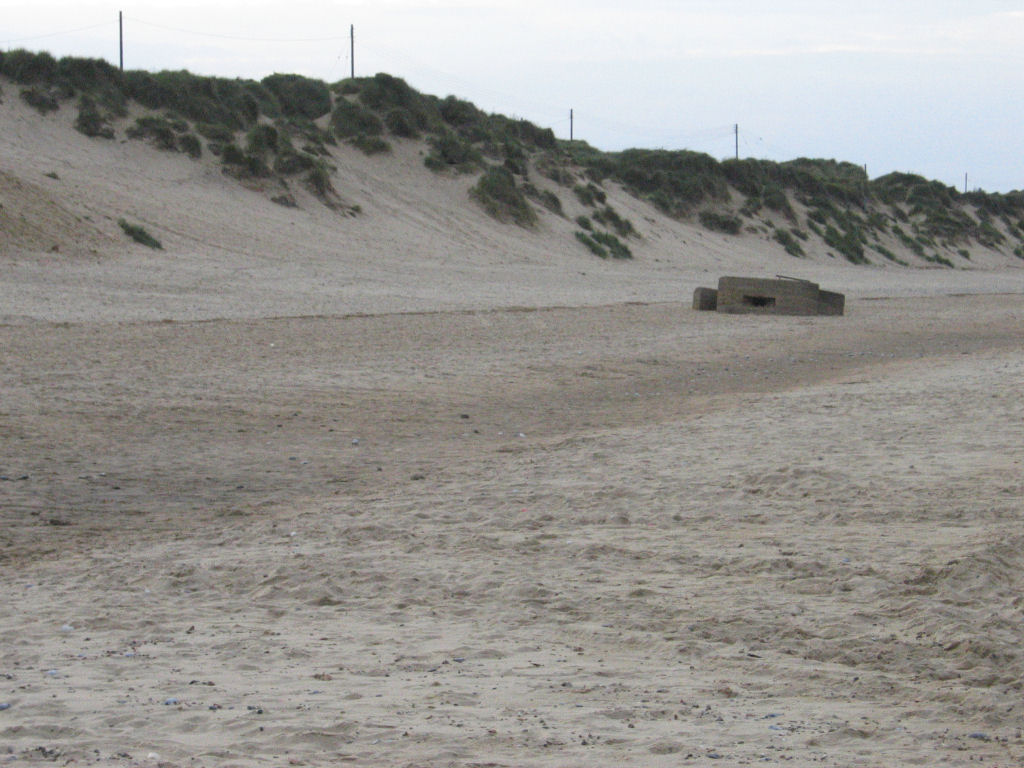
The beach at Hemsby

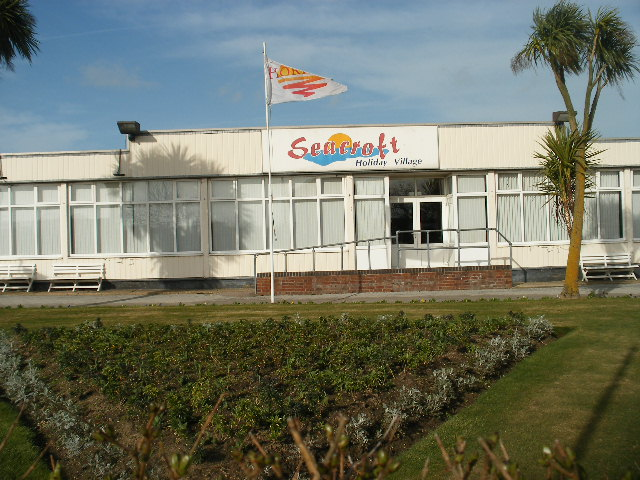
Seacroft Holiday Park, Beach Road

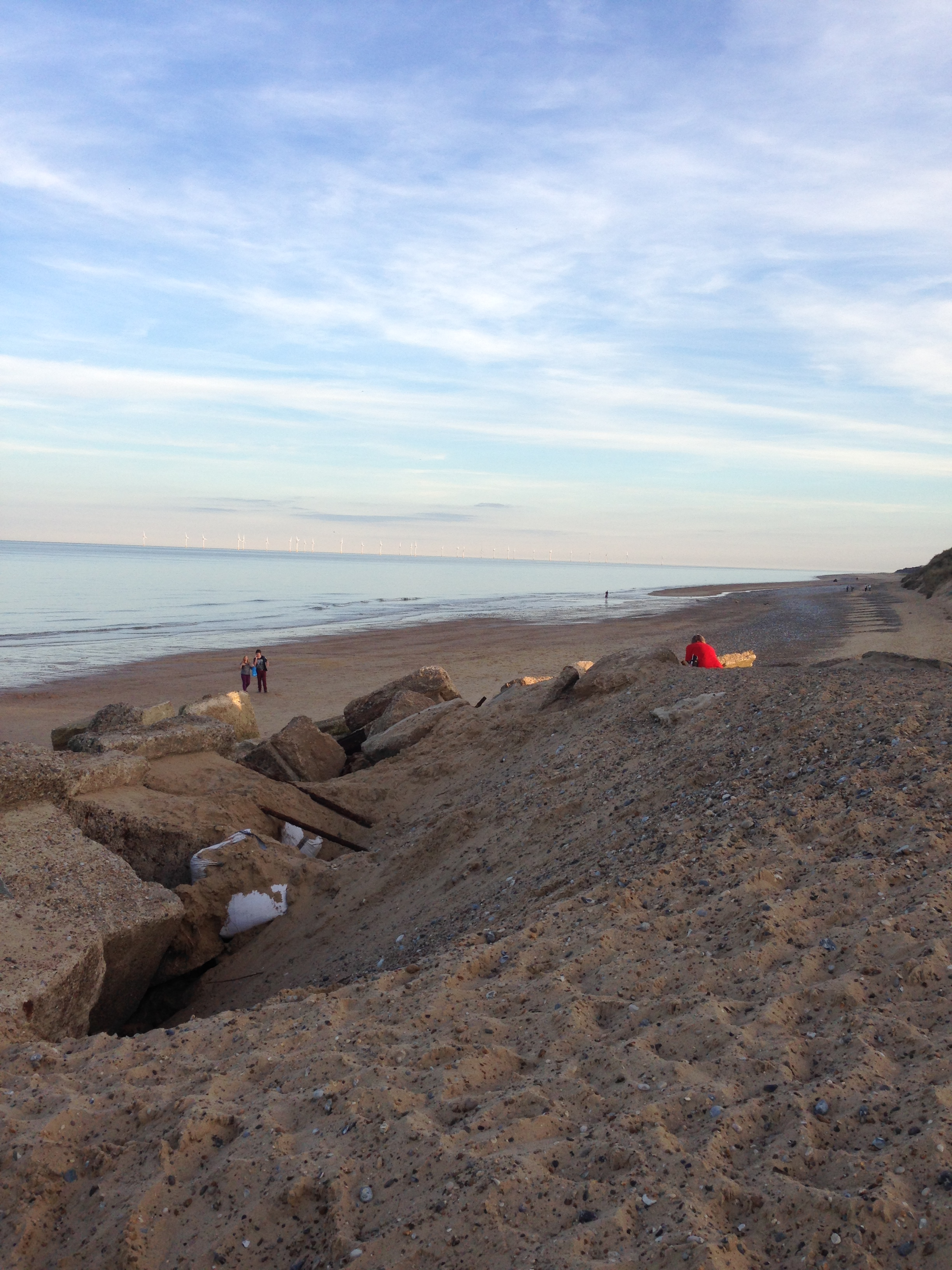
The beach at Hemsby

== Transport ==
Hemsby was once served by Hemsby railway station which was located on the Midland and Great Northern Joint Railway between Great Yarmouth (Beach) and Melton Constable. It was operational from 1878 to 1959. The LMS Ivatt Class 4 (2-6-0) steam locomotive was predominantly used on this route. Currently Hemsby is served by First Norfolk & Suffolk bus services, the 1, 1a and 1b. The 1b serves Hemsby Beach and the 1 and 1a serve the village; all stop at the Kingsway bus stop.

== Institutions ==
=== Charities ===
Hemsby is home to the Hemsby Inshore Rescue Service (better known as Hemsby Lifeboat), an independent and voluntary lifeboat service that operates within the nearby coastal areas and the broads. The institution is independent of the RNLI, relying entirely upon public donations in order to operate. Each year two fund-raising days are held, Hemsby Lifeboat Day and Hemsby Herring Festival, they are held on the beach, with a variety of stalls and booths to attract visitors. Save Hemsby Coastline is a registered charity, its sole purpose to raise awareness of the coastal erosion issues, and to gain protection for Hemsby Beach in the form of a rock berm. This is to be 1500 km, and planning permission has been granted, now we need the funds to secure Hemsby's future.

=== Churches ===
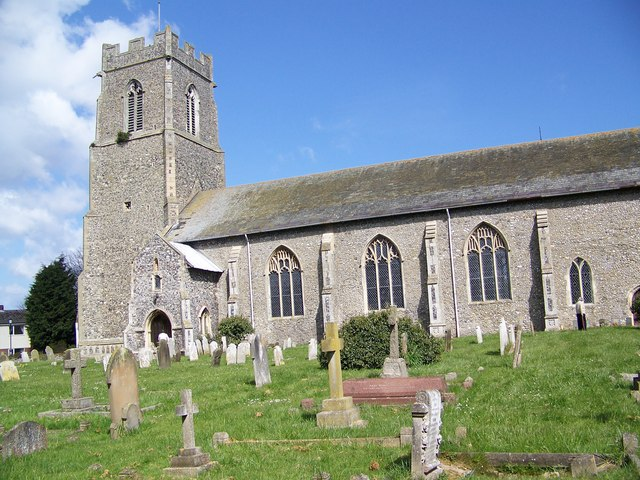
Church of St Mary the Virgin

The Grade II listed church of St Mary the Virgin dates from the early 14th century. The (Primitive) Methodist Church is located at 6 Waters Lane. It was built in 1879, and has a regular Sunday service at 11.00am. The Congregationalist Church was founded in 1862 and is located on Yarmouth Rd. It was quietly sold off, but the graveyard is still accessible to the public.

=== Schools ===
Hemsby's only school is Hemsby Primary School, a mixed-sex school for pupils aged 4 to 12. The school buildings date back to 1904. Due to the nature of Hemsby and the seasonal work that is offered, the turnover of pupils from the school is relatively high, as families move into or out of the area.

== War Memorial ==
Hemsby War Memorial is a rough-hewn wheel-headed cross with a large plinth and a surrounding wall made from flint. The memorial was erected in 1927 and lists the following names for the First World War:

| Rank | Name | Unit | Date of death | Burial/Commemoration |
|---|---|---|---|---|
| Capt. | Ralph Thurgar MC (Note: Captain Thurgar was awarded the Military Cross for gallantry during the Second Battle of Gaza after continuing to lead his men whilst wounded and then, when wounded again, continuing to direct his men from the ground.) | 4th Bn., Norfolk Regiment | 19 Apr. 1917 | Gaza War Cemetery |
| Lt. | Michael Scrimgeour | 8th Bn., Rifle Brigade | 30 Jul. 1915 | Menin Gate |
| SLt. | Robert E. Ferrier MiD | HMS Partridge | 12 Dec. 1917 | Portsmouth Naval Memorial |
| Sjt. | George W. Loades | 7th Bn., Norfolk Regiment | 13 Oct. 1915 | Loos Memorial |
| Cpl. | Arthur A. Thresher | Army Service Corps | 22 Apr. 1918 | Kirkee War Cemetery |
| Cpl. | Arthur V. King | 9th Bn., Norfolk Regt. | 26 Sep. 1915 | Loos Memorial |
| Cpl. | Albert S. King | 1st Bn., Wiltshire Regiment | 27 Nov. 1914 | Poperinge Old Cemetery |
| Gnr. | Maurice C. Myhill | 158th Bde., Royal Field Artillery | 28 Mar. 1918 | Pozières Memorial |
| Pte. | Malcolm Gibbs | 52nd Bn., Durham Light Infantry | 16 Jul. 1918 | Linthorpe Cemetery |
| Pte. | Norman R. Thurtle | 20th Bn., Middlesex Regiment | 22 Mar. 1918 | Arras Memorial |
| Pte. | Wilfred J. Long | 2nd Bn., Norfolk Regiment | 28 Apr. 1916 | Basra War Cemetery |
| Pte. | Alfred Edmonds | 7th Bn., Norfolk Regt. | 8 May 1917 | Duisans Cemetery |
| Pte. | Arthur C. Allen | 8th Bn., Norfolk Regt. | 3 Jul. 1916 | La Neuville Cemetery |
| Pte. | Walter Dyble | 9th Bn., Norfolk Regt. | 25 Jan. 1916 | Lijssenthoek Military Cemetery |
| Pte. | John W. Salter | 1st Bn., Queen's Own Regiment | 4 Oct. 1917 | Tyne Cot |
| Pte. | Frank Allen | 9th Queen's Royal Lancers | 22 Mar. 1918 | Pozières Memorial |
| Pte. | Thomas W. Turner | 10th Bn., Worcestershire Regt. | 10 Apr. 1918 | Tyne Cot |
| Smth | Sidney J. Knights | 114th Bde., Royal Field Artillery | 18 Mar. 1917 | Karasouli British Cemetery |

The following names were added after the Second World War:

| Rank | Name | Unit | Date of death | Burial/Commemoration |
|---|---|---|---|---|
| Lt. | John K. England MBE | 8th Bn., Royal Armoured Corps | 24 Mar. 1945 | Reichswald Forest Cemetery |
| FSgt. | Douglas J. Ives | No. 148 Squadron RAF | 12 Sep. 1944 | Milan War Cemetery |
| Sgt. | Derek C. Smith | Royal Air Force | 14 Mar. 1943 | Mautby Churchyard |
| LS | Charles E. Gibbs | H.M. Trawler Lord Selborne (Note: His Majesty's Trawler Lord Selborne was sunk after striking a mine in the River Humber.) | 31 Mar. 1941 | Lowestoft Memorial |
| AF | Trevor P. Smith | HMS Glorious | 8 Jun. 1940 | Lee-on-the-Solent Memorial |
| Dvr. | Stanley G.C. Armes | Royal Army Service Corps | 17 Nov. 1940 | St. Mary's Churchyard |
| Pte. | George Gibbs | 7th Bn., Gordon Highlanders | 26 Oct. 1944 | St. Peter's Churchyard |
| B1C | George W.B. Miatt | HMS Phoebe | 23 Oct. 1942 | Pointe-Noire European Cem. |
