= Sheringham and Beeston Regis Commons =

Site of Special Scientific Interest in Norfolk, England

Coordinates: 52.934°N 1.219°E

- Site of Special Scientific Interest
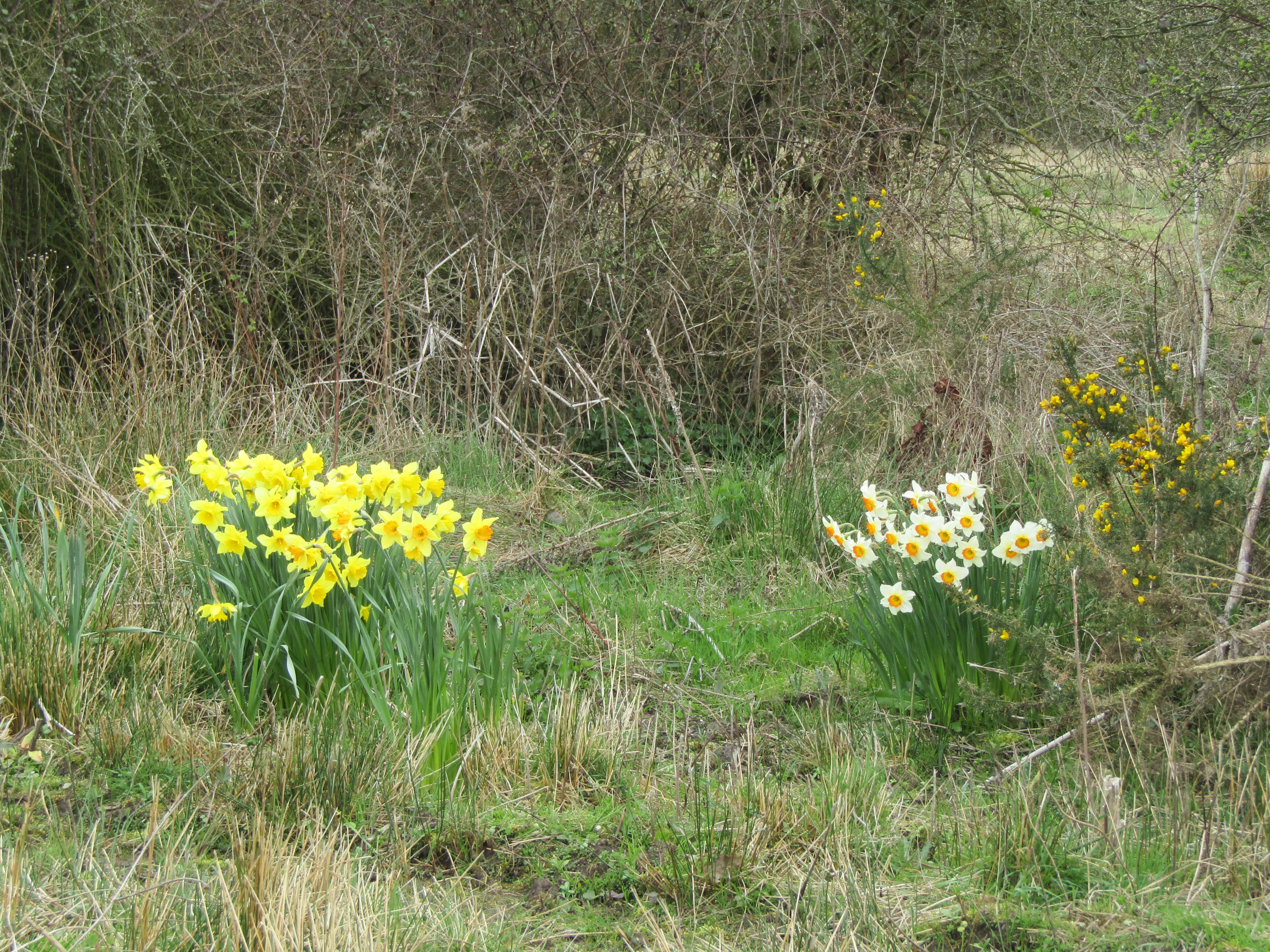
- Location of Sheringham and Beeston Regis Commons.
- Area of search: Norfolk
- Grid reference: TG 164 422
- Interest: Biological
- Area: 24.9 hectares (62 acres)
- Notification date: 1985
- Location map: Magic Map

Sheringham and Beeston Regis Commons is a 24.9-hectare (62-acre) biological Site of Special Scientific Interest in Sheringham in Norfolk, England. It is a Nature Conservation Review site and part of the Norfolk Valley Fens Special Area of Conservation and Norfolk Coast Area of Outstanding Natural Beauty.

These commons have areas of dry heathland which have several species of breeding birds and reptiles, and wet fen in low-lying areas where there are springs. Calcareous mires have uncommon plants such as butterwort and bog pimpernel.

The site is open to the public.
