= Horsey Beach =

Coastal area in Great Britain

Horsey Beach Horsey Gap
- Beach
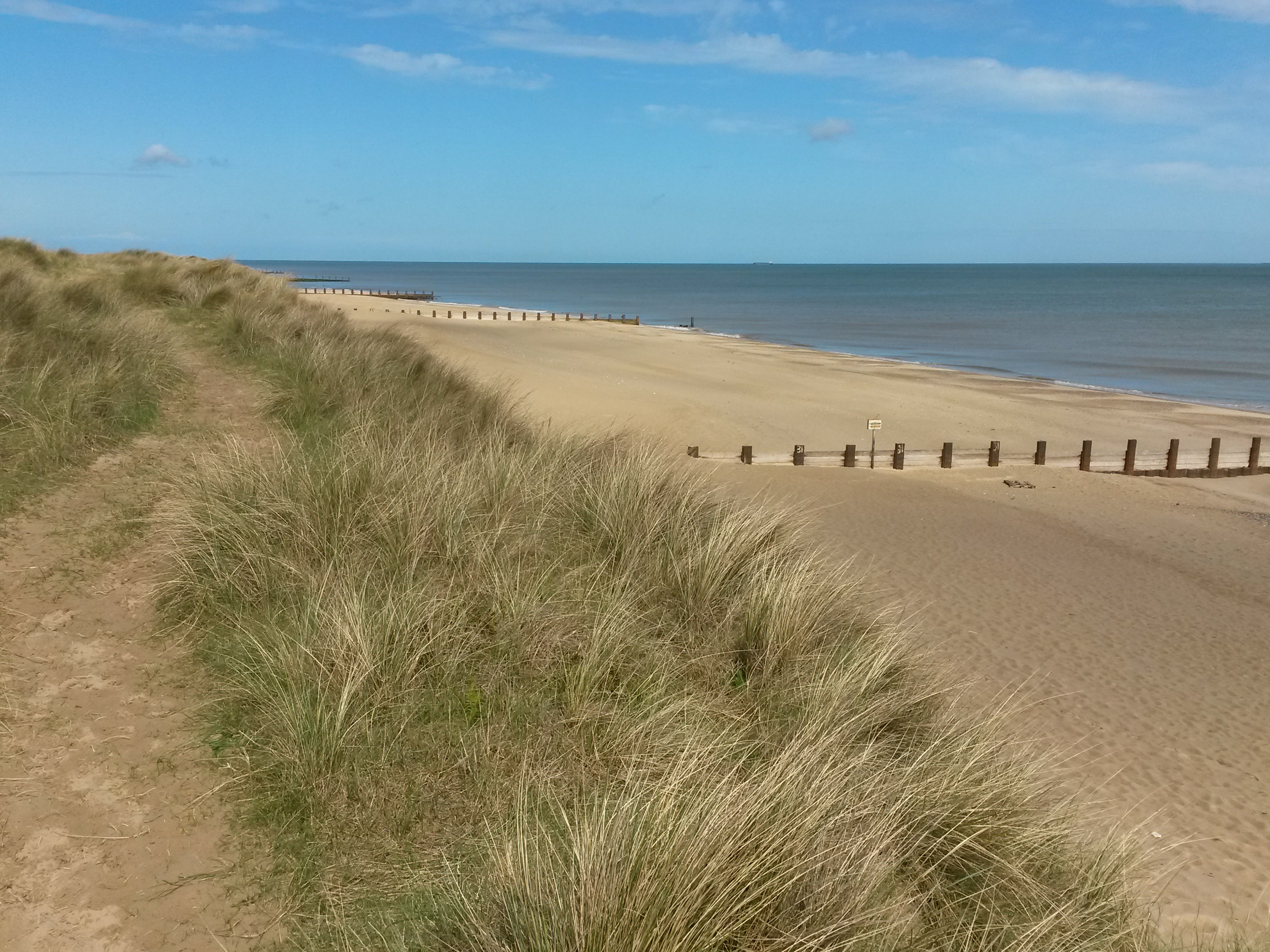

- Location within Norfolk
- Coordinates: 52.7561°N 1.6531°E
- Location: Horsey, Norfolk, England
- Website: www.horseygap.co.uk

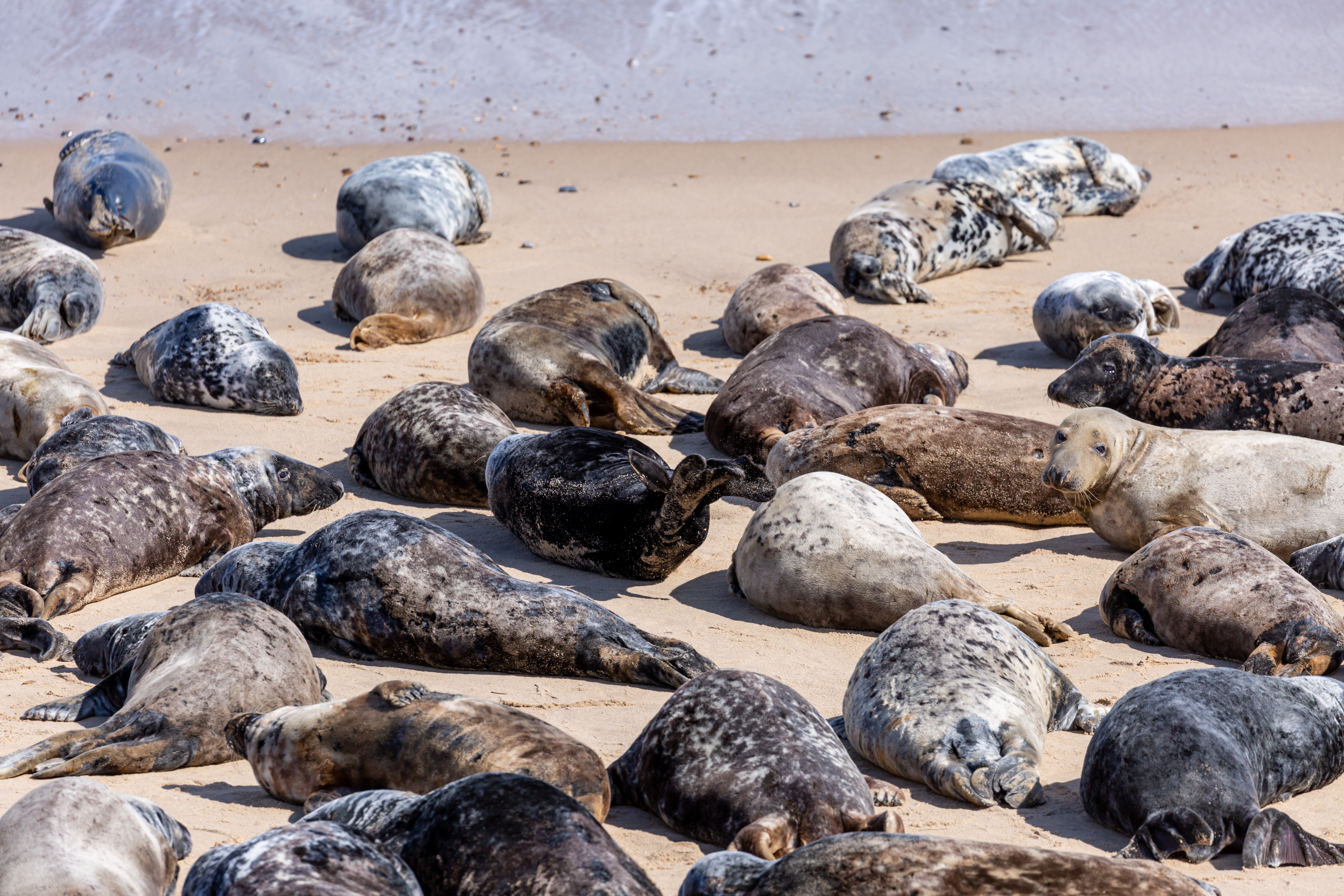
Seals at Horsey Dunes

Horsey Beach, also known as Horsey Gap or Horsey Dunes, is a beach on the east coast of Norfolk, England. It is owned by the National Trust and is within the Norfolk Coast AONB. It contains Horsey Dunes, one of the largest dune systems in Norfolk. To the south is the adjacent SSSI Winterton Dunes - it is possible to walk from one to the other.

The site is notable for a large colony of grey seals which breed there each winter.

The site, together with the adjoining Winterton Dunes, hosts the largest colonies of dark green fritillary and grayling butterflies in Norfolk. Other butterflies recorded from here in numbers include small copper and common blue.

The site has been subject to illegal raves in the past, which have significantly harmed the butterfly population.
