= Wells Chalk Pit =

Protected area in Norfolk, England

Coordinates: 52.949°N 0.870°E

- Site of Special Scientific Interest
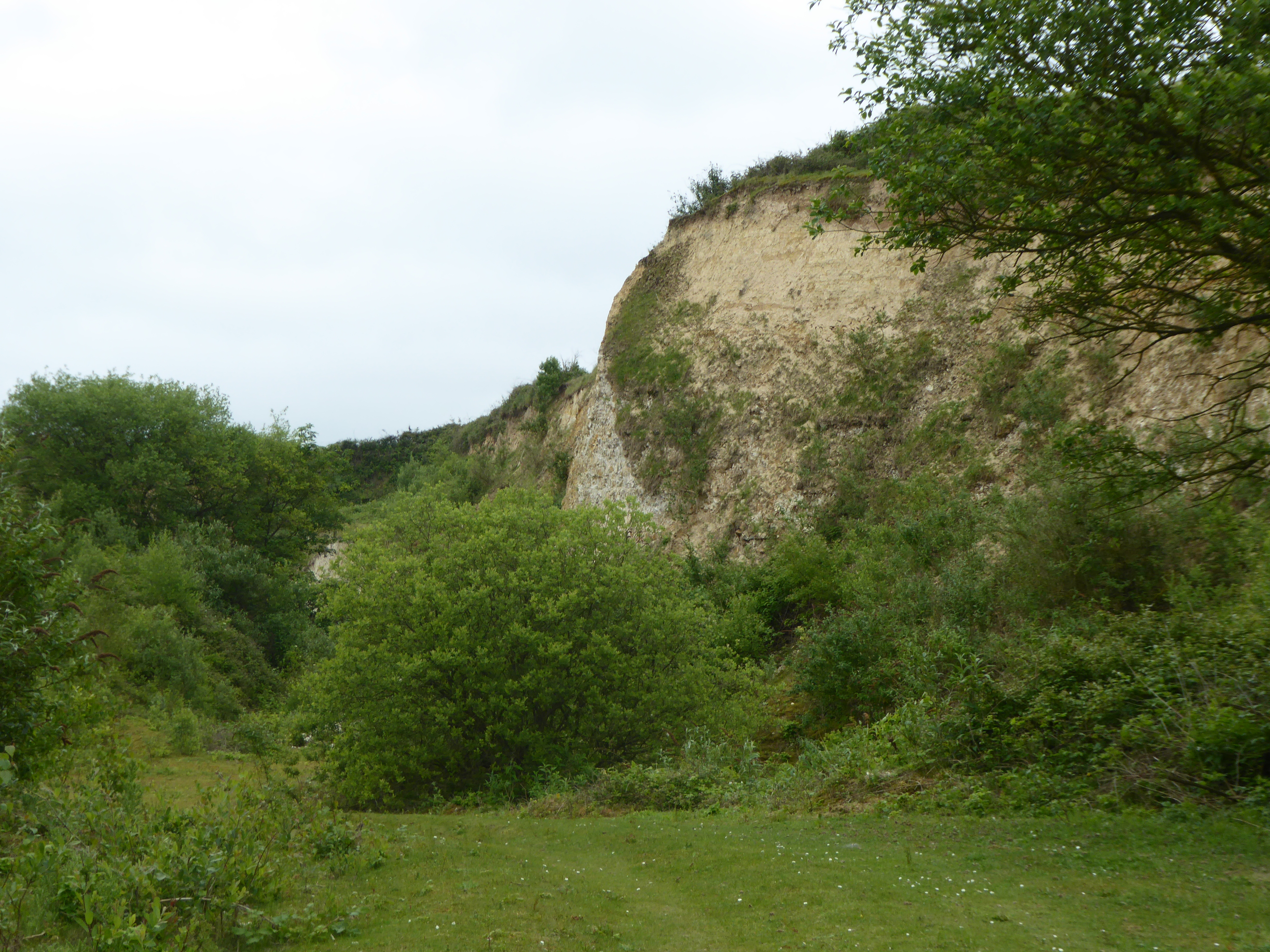
- Location of Wells Chalk Pit.
- Area of search: Norfolk, England
- Grid reference: TF 929 429
- Interest: Biological; Geological
- Area: 4.0 hectares (9.9 acres)
- Notification date: 1985
- Location map: Magic Map

Wells Chalk Pit is a 4-hectare (9.9-acre) biological and geological Site of Special Scientific Interest on the eastern outskirts of Wells-next-the-Sea in Norfolk, England. It is a Geological Conservation Review site, and it is in the Norfolk Coast Area of Outstanding Natural Beauty.

This quarry has chalk grassland with large populations of orchids in areas which have not been worked for many years. The site is also geologically important as it exposes the glacial deposits of the Marly Drift till, which was formerly believed to date to the Anglian glaciation, but may belong to the more recent Wolstonian ice age.

There is access to the site from Stiffkey Road.
