= Weybourne Town Pit =

UK Site of Special Scientific Interest

Coordinates: 52.946°N 1.173°E

- Site of Special Scientific Interest
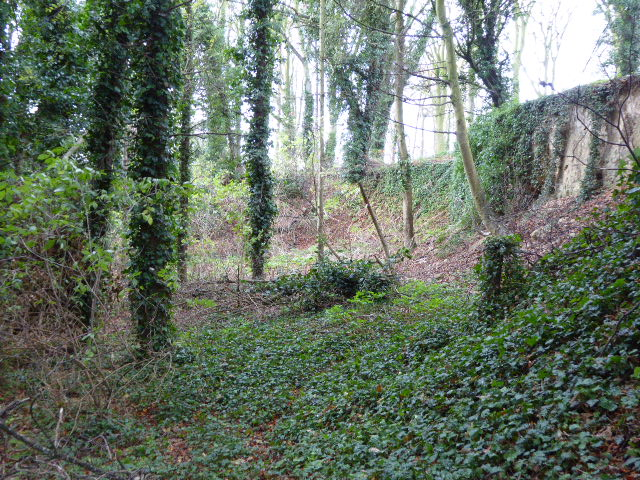
- Location of Weybourne Town Pit.
- Area of search: Norfolk, England
- Grid reference: TG 114 430
- Interest: Geological
- Area: 0.7 hectares (1.7 acres)
- Notification date: 1984
- Location map: Magic Map

Weybourne Town Pit is a 0.7-hectare (1.7-acre) geological Site of Special Scientific Interest west of Sheringham in Norfolk, England. It is a Geological Conservation Review site and it is in the Norfolk Coast Area of Outstanding Natural Beauty.

This is the type locality for the Pleistocene 'Marly Drift'. This is a chalk-rich glacial till thought to have been deposited during the Anglian stage around 450,000 years ago, but its relationship to other deposits in the area is disputed.

There is access to the site from Sheringham Road.
