= Glandford (Letheringsett Road) =

Geological site in Norfolk, England

Coordinates: 52.928°N 1.037°E

- Site of Special Scientific Interest
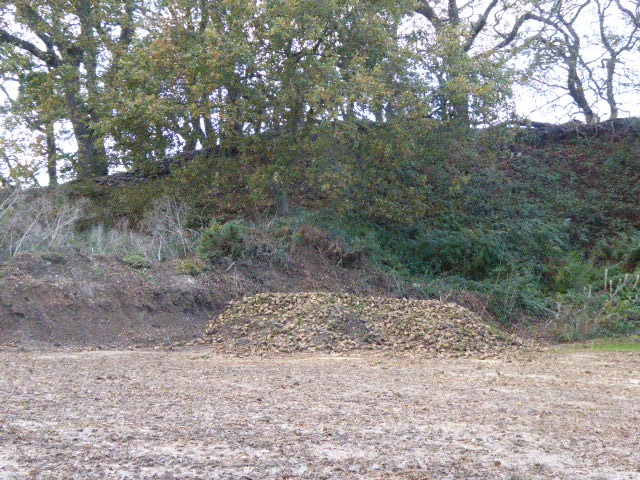
- Location of Glandford (Letheringsett Road).
- Area of search: Norfolk, England
- Grid reference: TG 042 410
- Interest: Geological
- Area: 1.1 hectares (2.7 acres)
- Notification date: 1992
- Location map: Magic Map

Glandford (Letheringsett Road) is a 1.1-hectare (2.7-acre) geological Site of Special Scientific Interest west of Sheringham in Norfolk, England. It is a Geological Conservation Review site and it is in the Norfolk Coast Area of Outstanding Natural Beauty.

This site is important because it has mounds of gravel and till which can help to show whether the North Norfolk till plain is the result of Pleistocene glacial deposition or is the residue of the erosion of a former more extensive area of gravel.

The site is private land with no public access.
