= Briton's Lane Gravel Pit =

Protected area in Norfolk, England

Coordinates: 52.926°N 1.225°E

- Site of Special Scientific Interest
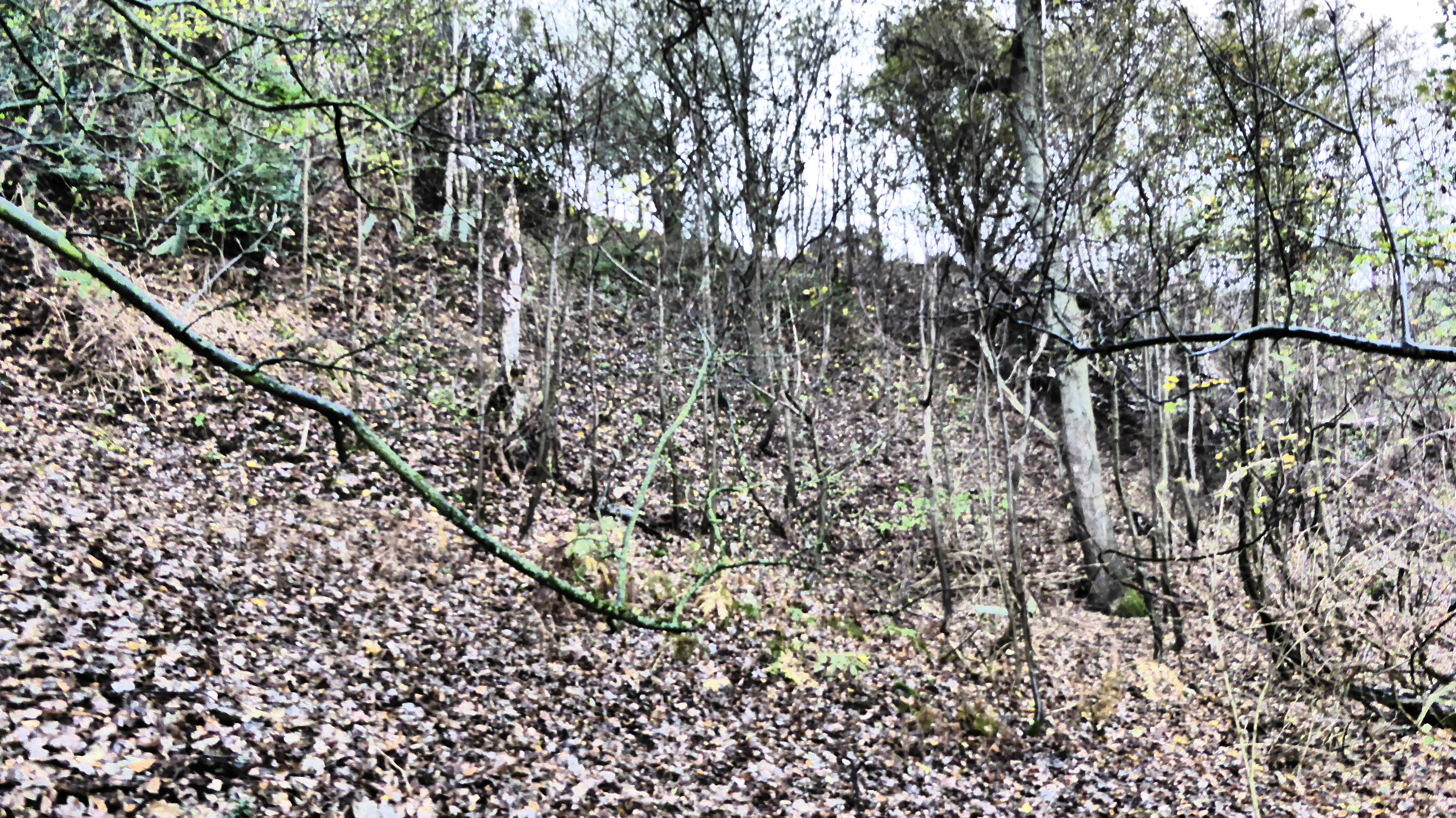
- Location of Briton's Lane Gravel Pit.
- Area of search: Norfolk, England
- Grid reference: TG 169 414
- Interest: Geological
- Area: 21.5 hectares (53 acres)
- Notification date: 1985
- Location map: Magic Map

Briton's Lane Gravel Pit is a 21.5-hectare (53-acre) geological Site of Special Scientific Interest east of Sheringham in Norfolk, England. It is a Geological Conservation Review site and it is in the Norfolk Coast Area of Outstanding Natural Beauty.

This working quarry exposes gravel and sand derived from melting ice at the end of the Anglian glaciation around 425,000 years ago.

The site is private land with no public access.
