= Blood Hill wind farm =

Wind farm in Norfolk, England

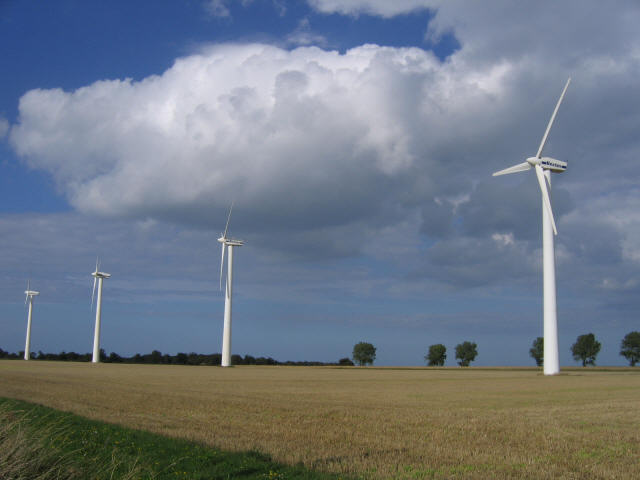
- Blood Hill Wind Turbines
- Country: England, United Kingdom
- Location: Near Hemsby in Norfolk
- Coordinates: 52°42′43″N 1°40′1″E
- Status: Operational
- Commission date: December 1992

Power generation
- Units operational: 10
- Make and model: Vestas: V27
- Nameplate capacity: 2.25 MW

External links
- Website: https://web.archive.org/web/20070402205350/http://www.eon-uk.com/451.aspx
- Commons: Related media on Commons

Blood Hill is a wind farm near Hemsby in Norfolk, England. It is the smallest windfarm owned by E.ON; taking up 3 hectares. It has a nameplate capacity of 2.25MW which is enough to power 1000 homes at peak. There were 10 Vestas V27-225 kW turbines which were 30 metres tall and stand on top of Blood Hill. They are visible from the villages of Hemsby and Winterton-on-Sea. Blood Hill began operating in December 1992 and was one of the first windfarms in the United Kingdom.

In 2000 a much larger 65m 1.5MW Ecotricity turbine was built adjacent to the site.

In 2015 a repowering of the site saw the original 10 turbines replaced with two Turbowind T400 wind turbines.

== See also ==
- Wind power in the United Kingdom
- Sheringham Shoal Offshore Wind Farm
- Scroby Sands wind farm
