= Horsey, Norfolk =

Village in Norfolk, England

Coordinates: 52.749°N 1.639°E

Horsey
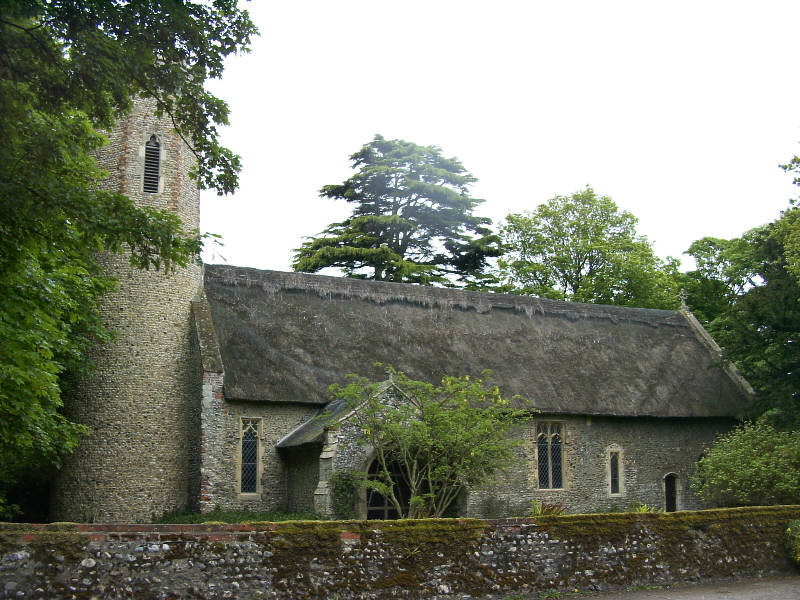
- All Saints' Church

- Location within Norfolk
- Area: 3.20 sq mi (8.3 km^{2})
- OS grid reference: TG4523
- Civil parish: Horsey
- District: North Norfolk
- Shire county: Norfolk
- Region: East
- Country: England
- Sovereign state: United Kingdom
- Post town: GREAT YARMOUTH
- Postcode district: NR29
- Dialling code: 01493
- UK Parliament: North Norfolk

Horsey is a village and civil parish in the English county of Norfolk, within The Broads National Park.

Horsey is located 9.9 miles (15.9 km) north of Great Yarmouth and 17 miles (27 km) north-east of Norwich.

== History ==
Horsey's name is of Anglo-Saxon origin and derives from the Old English for horse island.

In the Domesday Book, Horsey is listed as a settlement of 30 households in the hundred of Happing. In 1086, the village was divided between the East Anglian estates of Roger Bigod, William, Bishop of Thetford, Rolf and Almer, son of Godwin.

Horsey Hall was built in the village in 1845.

Horsey Windpump was a drainage pump built in 1912 by Dan England which was struck by lightning in 1943 which stopped it from working. 75 years later, the building was restored and reopened by the National Trust. The original pumping duties of the windpump are now the responsibility of the electric pumphouse built nearby.

During the Second World War, pillboxes, gun emplacements and minefields were dug in Horsey to defend against a possible German invasion.

== Geography ==
Due to its small size, population statistics for Horsey Civil Parish are included with nearby Sea Palling.

Horsey Mere is one of the Norfolk Broads which is a Site of Special Scientific Interest which is home to a rich variety of wildlife, particularly natterjack toads. Allegedly, the mere was used as a mass burial place for Roman children which supposedly reappear in ghostly form once a year.

Horsey Dunes are a set of sand dunes close to the coast which are cared for by the National Trust and are another Site of Special Scientific Interest. The area (particularly Horsey Beach) is popular with grey seals.

== All Saints' Church ==
Horsey's parish church is one of Norfolk's 124 round-tower churches, dating from the Thirteenth Century. All Saints' is located on All Saints' Lane and has been Grade II listed since 1955. The church holds Sunday service once a month.

All Saints' was restored in the Victorian era and features some stained-glass memorials.

== Governance ==
Horsey is part of the electoral ward of Hickling for local elections and is part of the district of North Norfolk.

The village's national constituency is North Norfolk, which has been represented by the Liberal Democrat Steff Aquarone MP since 2024.

== War Memorial ==
Horsey's war memorials are a set of plaques inside All Saints' Church which list the following names for the First World War:

| Rank | Name | Unit | Date of death | Burial/Commemoration |
|---|---|---|---|---|
| Pte. | Walter F. Self | 18th Bn., Lancashire Fusiliers | 1 Jun. 1918 | Pozières Memorial |
| Pte. | Christopher Thirtle | 1st Bn., Middlesex Regiment | 26 Sep. 1917 | Thiepval Memorial |
| Pte. | Edgar C. Chamberlain | 7th Bn., Norfolk Regiment | 12 Oct. 1916 | Thiepval Memorial |
| Pte. | William Hewitt | 8th Bn., Norfolk Regt. | 1 Jul. 1916 | Carnoy Military Cemetery |
| Dhd. | John F. Johnson | H.M. Trawler Nadine (Note: His Majesty's Trawler 'Nadine' was a Grimsby-built trawler which was requisitioned by the Admiralty and sunk by a naval mine laid by the German U-Boat UC-7.) | 1 Sep. 1915 | Chatham Naval Memorial |

The following name was added after the Second World War:

| Rank | Name | Unit | Date of death | Burial/Commemoration |
|---|---|---|---|---|
| Pte. | Robert Fuller | 2nd Bn., Royal Norfolk Regiment | 9 Jun. 1944 | Kohima War Cemetery |
