= Linthorpe Cemetery =

Cemetery in Middlesbrough, England

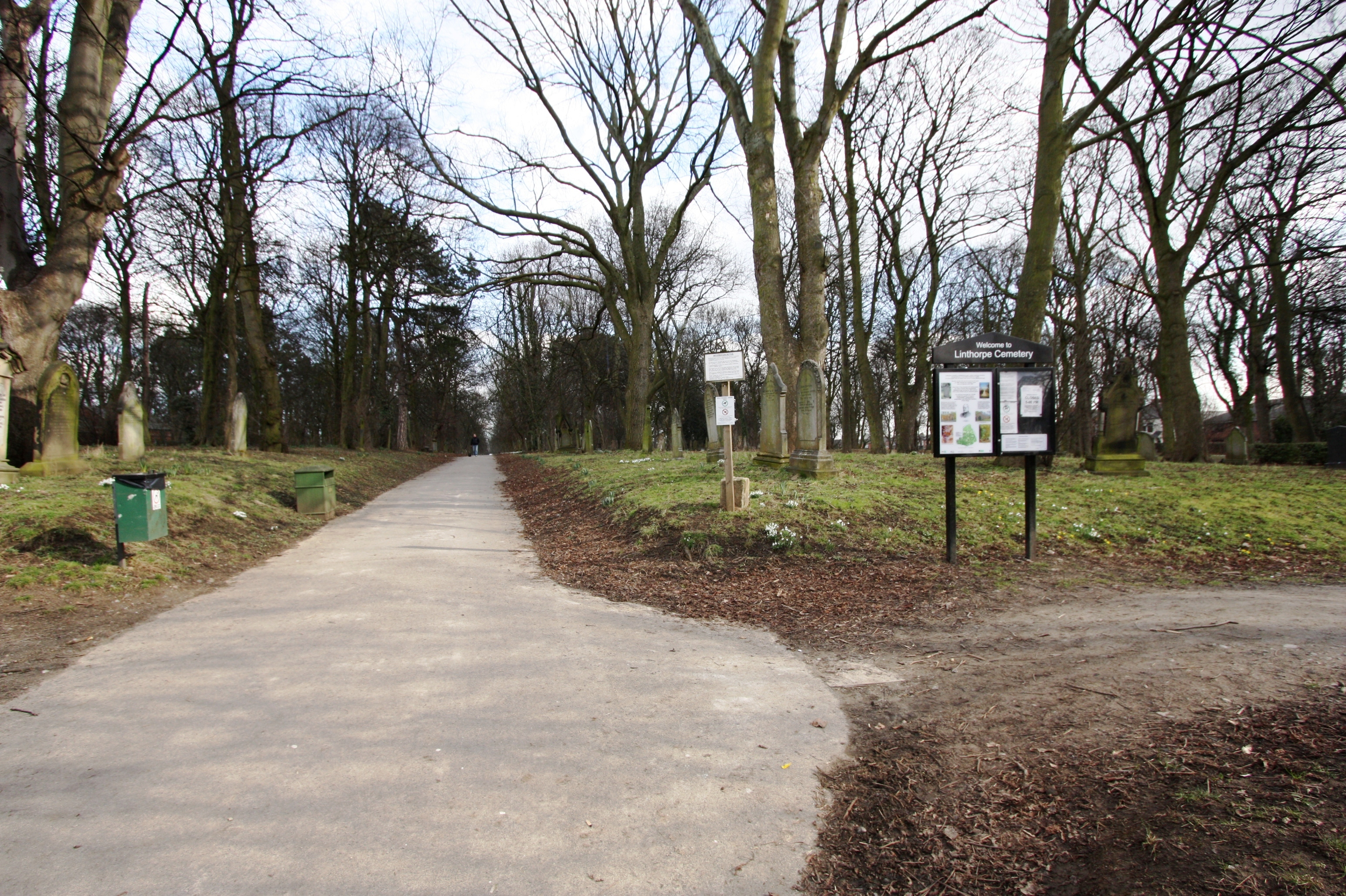
- Interactive map of Linthorpe Cemetery

Details
- Location: North Yorkshire, England
- Coordinates: 54.559°N 1.259°W grid reference NZ480185
- Find a Grave: Linthorpe Cemetery

Linthorpe Cemetery is the oldest working cemetery in Middlesbrough, North Yorkshire, England. The earliest burials in the main cemetery date back to 1869. This 52-acre (21 ha) site is the largest area of woodland in central Middlesbrough.

The cemetery contains war graves of 222 Commonwealth service personnel, nearly 160 from the First World War and nearly 60 from the Second World War.

Declared a Local Nature Reserve in 2003, it provides a semi-natural habitat that supports a range of wildlife, particularly birds, including Blackcaps, Siskin,tawny owl, great spotted woodpecker and treecreeper.

The cemetery encompasses a Quaker burial ground, situated just off Ayresome Green Lane, in which the burials date back to 1668.

From 2005 to 2007 the cemetery underwent a £1.7 million restoration programme, funded by Middlesbrough Council and the Heritage Lottery Fund, which included; restoring the Mortuary Chapel for use by the Friends of Linthorpe Cemetery as an exhibition space, converting of the Hebrew Prayer House into an educational and community space, improving the path network and cemetery boundaries, tree and hedgerow planting, and cast iron benches specially designed by local children depicting the theme of 'Flora and Fauna of Linthorpe Cemetery'.
