= Winterton (surname) =

Winterton is a surname. Notable people with the surname include:

- Ann Winterton (born 1941), UK politician
- George Winterton (1946–2008), Australian barrister
- Sir Nicholas Winterton (born 1938), UK politician
- Paul Winterton (1908-2001), UK journalist and novelist writing using noms-de-plume
- Rosie Winterton (born 1958), UK politician
- Ryan Winterton (born 2003), Canadian ice hockey player
