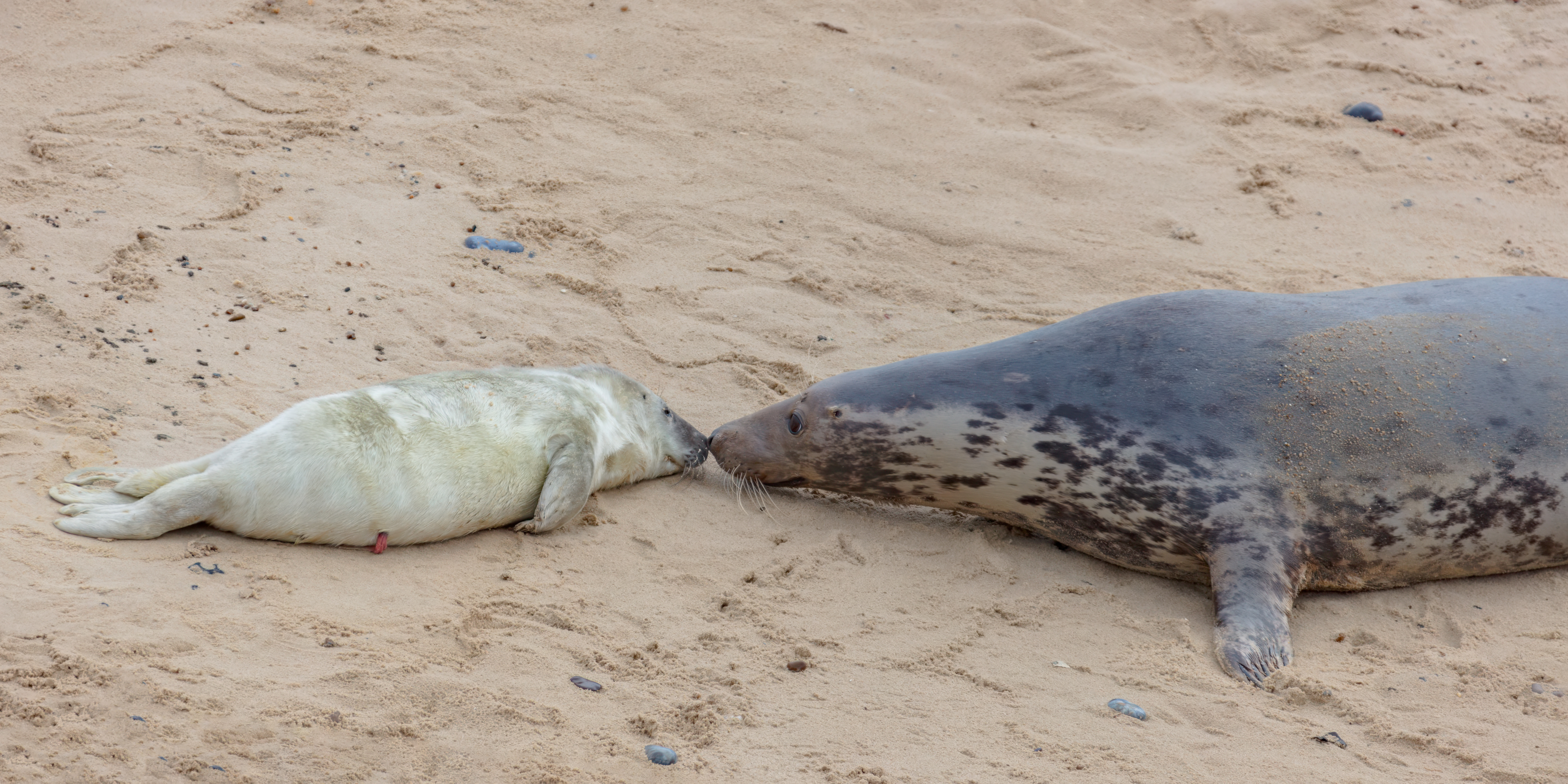
- Female with pup on Horsey Beach, England
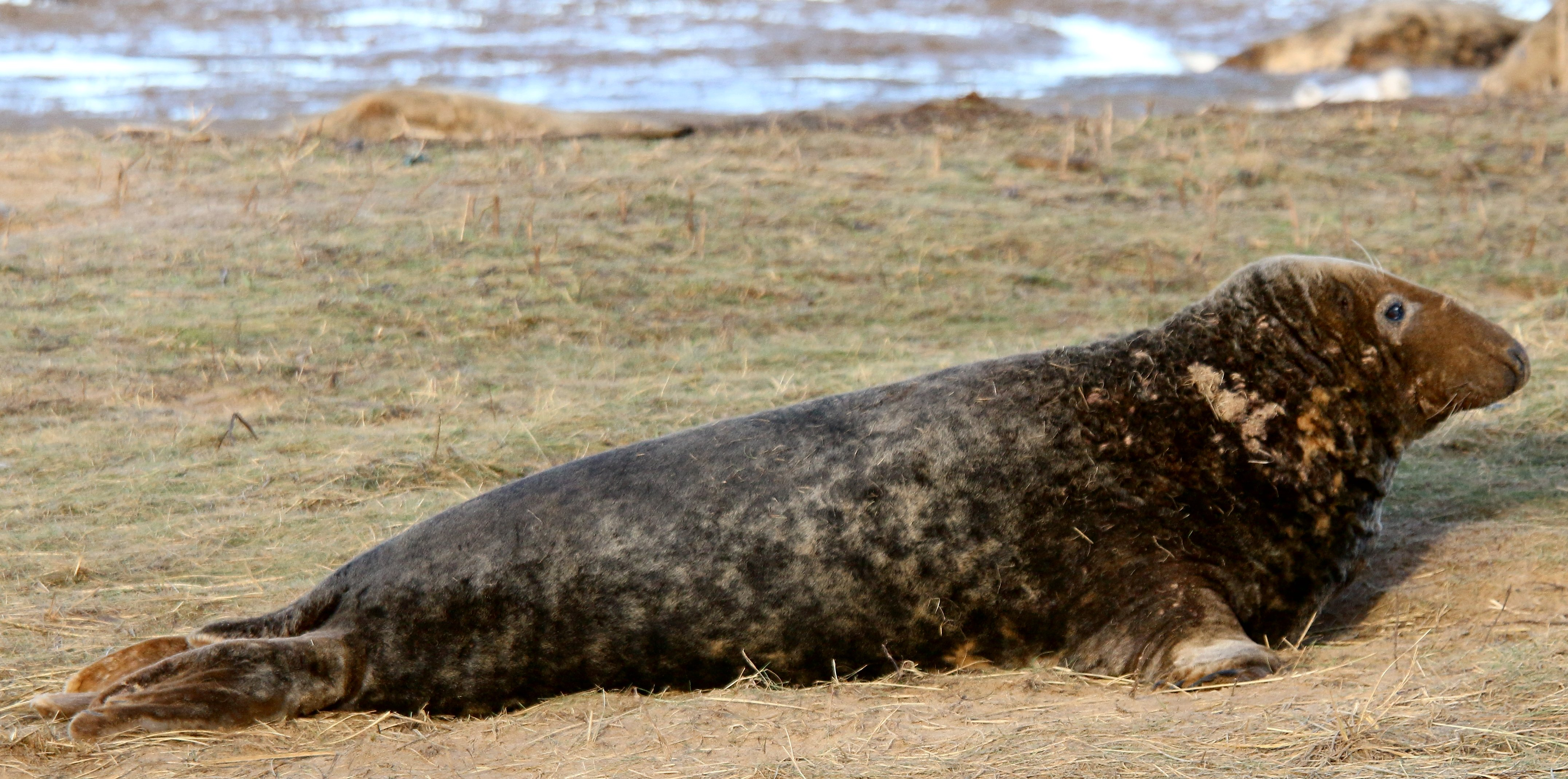
- Male in Donna Nook, England

Conservation status
- Least Concern (IUCN 3.1)

Scientific classification
- Kingdom: Animalia
- Phylum: Chordata
- Class: Mammalia
- Order: Carnivora
- Parvorder: Pinnipedia
- Family: Phocidae
- Subfamily: Phocinae
- Tribe: Phocini
- Genus: Halichoerus; Nilsson, 1820
- Species: H. grypus

Binomial name
- Halichoerus grypus (O. Fabricius, 1791)
- Grey seal range

= Grey seal =

Species of pinniped

The grey seal (Halichoerus grypus), or gray seal in the United States, is a large seal of the family Phocidae, which are commonly referred to as "true seals" or "earless seals". The only species classified in the genus Halichoerus, it is found on both shores of the North Atlantic Ocean. The name Halichoerus grypus is taken from Ancient Greek via Latin, and means "hook-nosed sea pig". It is also known as the horsehead seal, owing to its large head.

The grey seal is large and heavy, with individuals from the eastern Atlantic being 1.6–2.3 m (5 ft 3 in – 7 ft 7 in) long and weighing 100–310 kg (220–680 lb), while individuals from the western Atlantic are up to 2.7 m (8 ft 10 in) long, and can reach a weight of as much as 400 kg (880 lb). It is found widely across the northern Atlantic, ranging from the US to Russia, and occasionally as far south as Portugal. It can be divided into two subspecies: the Baltic grey seal (Halichoerus grypus grypus), found in the Baltic Sea, and the Atlantic grey seal (Halichoerus grypus atlantica), found everywhere else. The largest populations are in Canada and the UK.

Grey seals have a varied diet, feeding mostly on fish, and occasionally on invertebrates such as octopuses and lobsters. Their main predators are orcas, and they are also prey to sharks. The pups are preyed upon by eagles and gulls.

== Taxonomy ==
There are two recognized subspecies:

Image	Subspecies	Distribution
see caption.	Halichoerus grypus grypus Fabricius, 1791	Baltic Sea
see caption.	Halichoerus grypus atlantica Nehring, 1886	western North Atlantic stock (eastern Canada and the northeastern United States), the eastern North Atlantic stock (British Isles, Iceland, Norway, Denmark, the Faroe Islands, and Russia)

The type specimen of H. g. grypus (Zoological Museum of Copenhagen specimen ZMUC M11-1525, caught in 1788 off the island of Amager, Danish part of the Baltic Sea) was believed lost for many years, but was rediscovered in 2016, and a DNA test showed it belonged to a Baltic Sea specimen rather than from Greenland, as had previously been assumed (because it was first described in Otto Fabricius' book on the animals in Greenland: Fauna Groenlandica). The name H. g. grypus was therefore transferred to the Baltic subspecies (replacing H. g. macrorhynchus), and the name H. g. atlantica resurrected for the Atlantic subspecies.

Molecular studies have indicated that the eastern and western Atlantic populations have been genetically distinct for at least one million years, and could potentially be considered separate subspecies.

In 2022, overlap in the range of the two subspecies was recorded for the first time. This brings the possibility that hybridisation may occur. As of 2026, no hybrids have been reported.

== Description ==
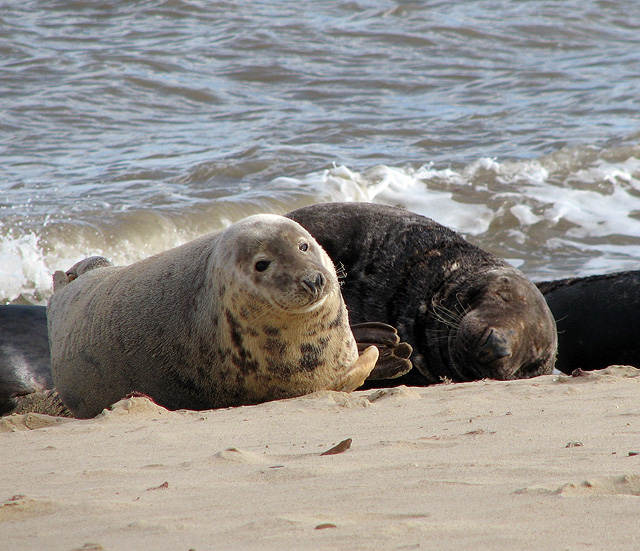
Female (left) and male (right), displaying difference in colour and snout shape, Horsey Beach, England

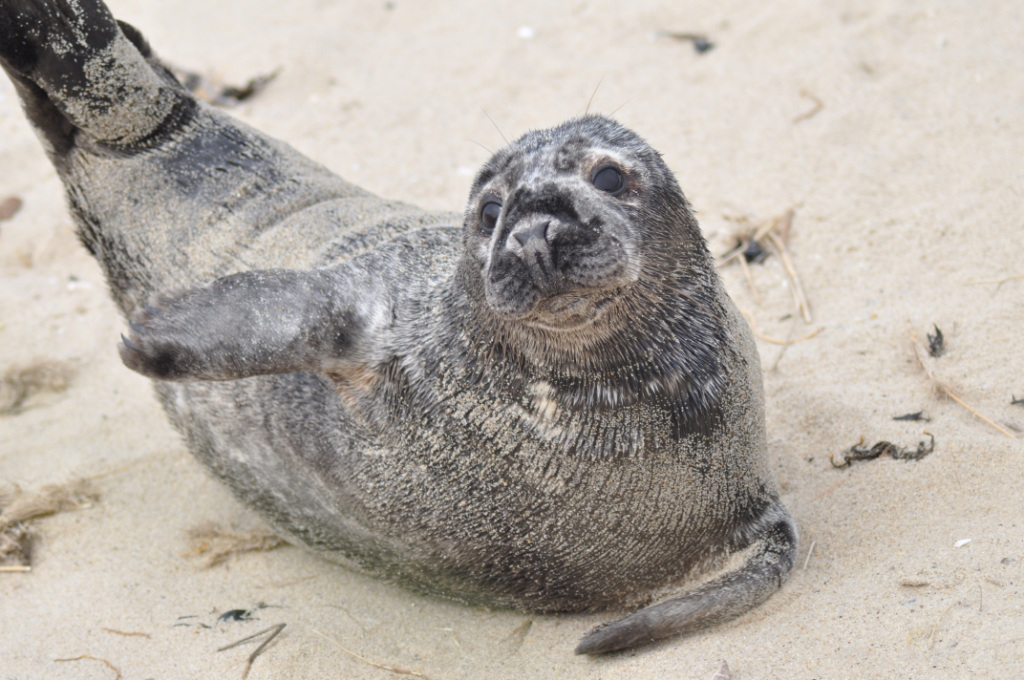
A yearling of ambiguous sex — juveniles are often a solid colour, and can be difficult or impossible to sex

The grey seal is large and heavy: In the eastern Atlantic, males are typically 1.95–2.3 m (6 ft 5 in – 7 ft 7 in) long and weigh 170–310 kg (370–680 lb); the females are much smaller, typically 1.6–1.95 m (5 ft 3 in – 6 ft 5 in) long and 100–190 kg (220–420 lb) in weight. Individuals from the western Atlantic are often much larger, with males averaging up to 2.7 m (8 ft 10 in) and reaching a weight of as much as 400 kg (880 lb) and females averaging up to 2.05 m (6 ft 9 in) and sometimes weighing up to 250 kg (550 lb). Record-sized bull grey seals can reach about 3.3 m (10 ft 10 in) in length. A common average weight in Great Britain was found to be about 233 kg (514 lb) for males and 154.6 kg (341 lb) for females whereas in Nova Scotia, Canada, adult males averaged 294.6 kg (649 lb) and adult females averaged 224.5 kg (495 lb).

Colours and patterns are highly variable. Males tend to have a light pattern on a dark background, while females tend to have the opposite — a dark pattern on a light background, often with a noticeably light belly. The neck and chest of males tend to be wrinkled and scarred, while females are smoother. Males have an especially wide muzzle. Males have a large, visible opening on the lower abdomen, while females have no obvious openings. Juveniles are often a solid colour, and can be difficult or impossible to sex. About 1 in 400 seal pups are melanistic, where they have a solid black coat.

=== Differences from other seals ===
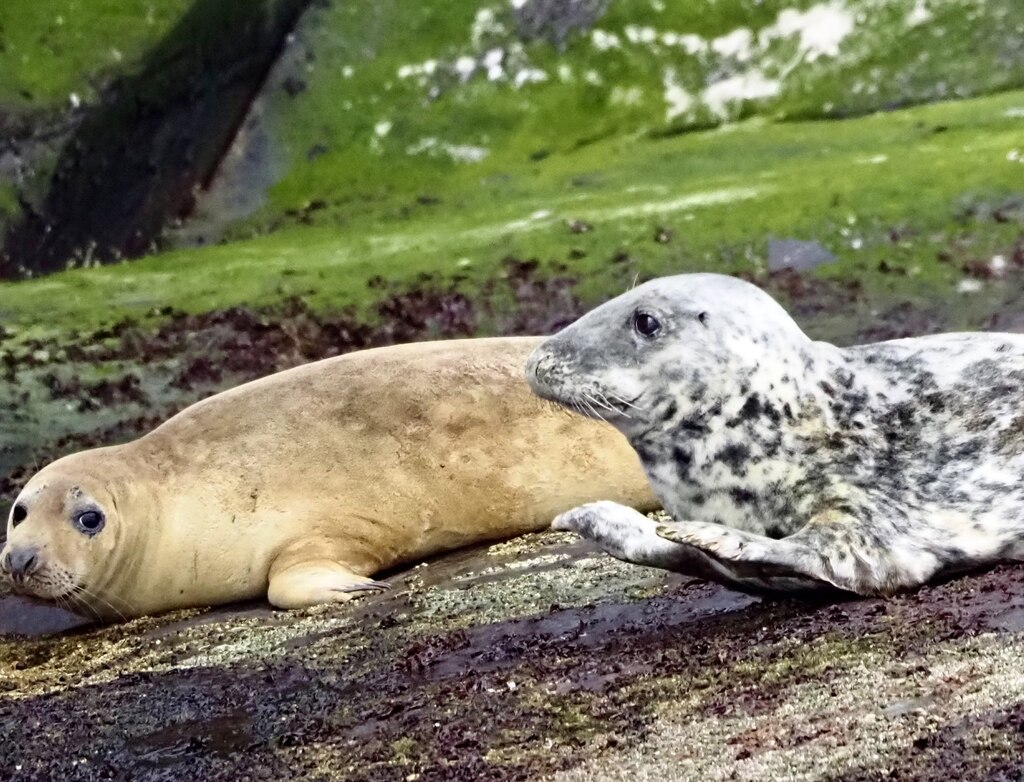
A harbour (or "common") seal (left), and a grey seal (right). Note the difference in snout length

Grey seals lack external ear flaps (as with their fellow earless seals), and characteristically have large snouts, often referred to as a "Roman nose".

The Harbour seal occurs across the entire range of the grey seal, and they can be difficult to tell apart. Compared to the harbour seal, the grey seal has a longer, more sloped snout, a flatter head, and eyes which are set farther apart. The nostrils of the harbour seal form a "V" shape, appearing to meet at the bottom, while the nostrils of the grey seal are more parallel. The grey seal has fewer, larger spots than the harbour seal. Grey seals are often larger than harbour seals, and are about 3 times heavier.

Wintering hooded seals can be confused with grey seals as they are about the same size and somewhat share a large-nosed look. They can be distinguished by the fact that the hooded seal has a paler base colour and usually evidences a stronger spotting.

== Distribution and habitat ==
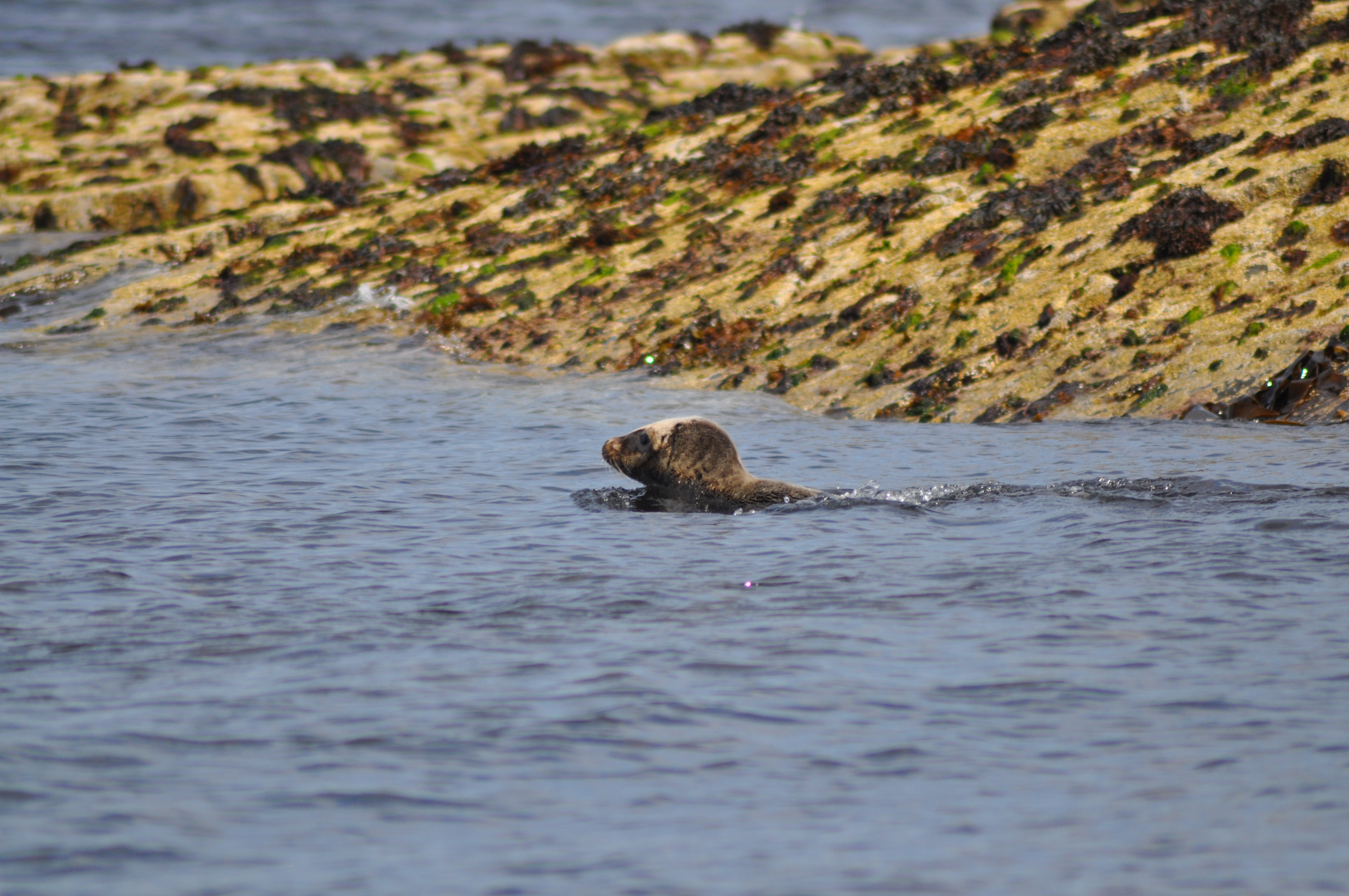
A juvenile swimming in the Farne Islands, UK

The grey seal is resident to 18 countries: Belgium, Canada, Denmark (including Faroe Islands), Estonia, Finland, France, Germany, Iceland, Ireland, Latvia, Lithuania, the Netherlands, Norway, Poland, Russia, Sweden, the United Kingdom, and the United States of America. It is also an occasional vagrant in Greenland and Portugal. The global population was estimated to be about 632,000 in 2016.

In the UK, the most ecologically significant breeding grounds, classified as Special Areas of Conservation (SACs) Grade A/B, are as follows (percentage of annual UK pup production in parentheses): Monach Islands, Outer Hebrides (20%); Faray and Holm of Faray, Orkney (9%); North Rona, Outer Hebrides (5%); Isle of May, Fife (4.5%); Treshnish Isles, Inner Hebrides (3%); Berwickshire and North Northumberland Coast (2.5%); and Pembrokeshire Marine (2%).

Some of the more touristically significant breeding grounds in the UK which aren't SACs include: Blakeney Point and Horsey Beach in Norfolk, various locations in Cornwall, and Donna Nook in Lincolnshire. Large numbers of grey seals have recently commenced a recolonisation of the tidal section of the River Thames in London; a survey conducted by the ZSL in 2024 found that around 3,000 grey seals were living in the area. In Ireland, the 5 largest colonies are in order: Inishkea Islands, County Mayo; various islands in Connemara, County Galway; various islands in County Donegal; Blasket Islands, County Kerry; and Saltee Islands, County Wexford.

In the German Bight, colonies exist off the islands Sylt, Amrum and on Heligoland.

In Iceland, the largest colony is in Breiðafjörður, with 62% of Iceland's pups being born there. Other large colonies can be found on Iceland's northwest coast, in Strandir and Skagafjörður, and the south coast, in Öræfi and Surtsey.

In Canada, the grey seal is typically found in large numbers in the coastal waters of the Maritime Provinces. It is typically seen in areas such as the Gulf of St. Lawrence, Newfoundland, Prince Edward Island, and Quebec. The largest colony in the world is on Sable Island, Nova Scotia, with an estimated 76,600 pups born in 2021.

In the US, it is found year-round off the coast of New England, in particular Maine and Massachusetts. There are colonies all along the northern Atlantic coast as far south as New Jersey, and occasional sightings have been reported as far as North Carolina. Archaeological evidence confirms grey seals in southern New England with remains found on Block Island, Martha's Vineyard, and near the mouth of the Quinnipiac River in New Haven, Connecticut, and there is a report by Farley Mowat of historic breeding colonies as far south as Cape Hatteras, North Carolina. Its range is expanding south, with a growing population in North Carolina.

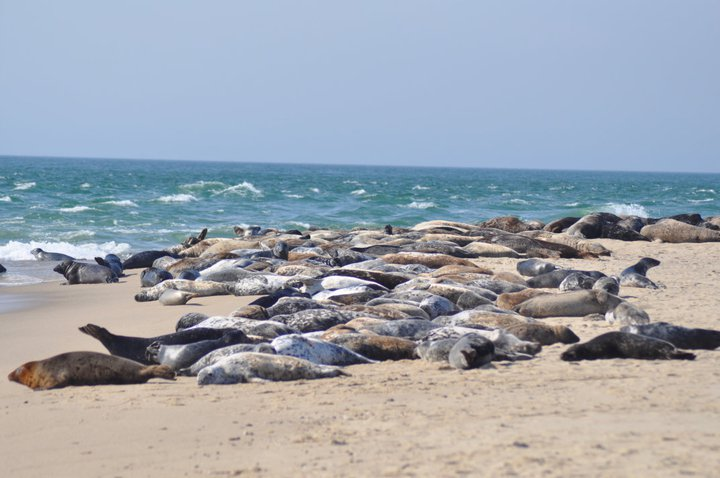
A large colony at Nantucket National Wildlife Refuge, Massachusetts, USA. Note the wide variety of colours

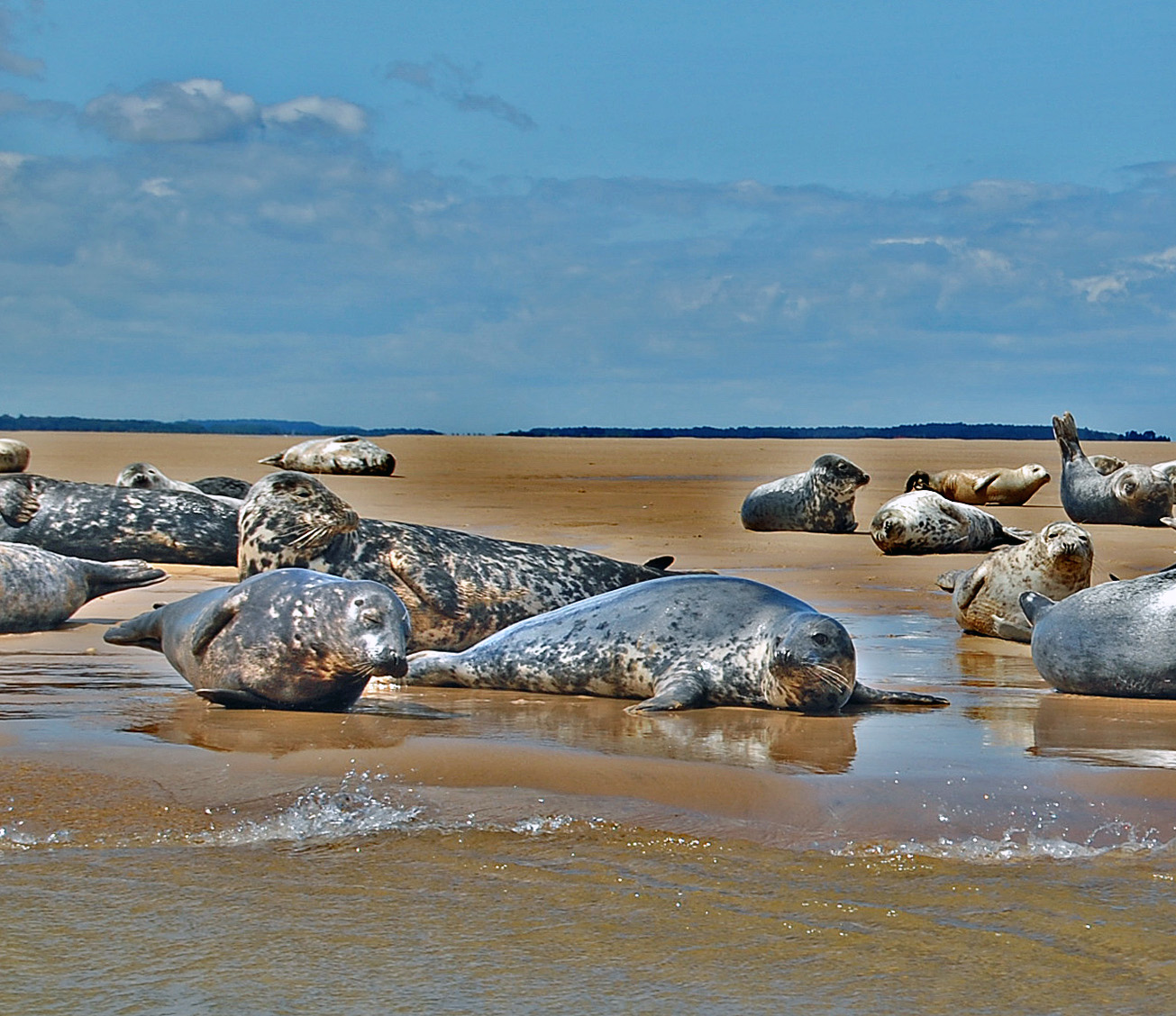
Group of grey seals on sands at Stiffkey, Norfolk

Local population numbers of grey seal
Region	Pups born annually	Year
Canada (total)	98,200	2021
Canada, Sable Island	76,600	2021
UK (total)	57,000	2012
UK, Scotland	50,000	2012
Canada, Gulf of St Lawrence	16,900	2021
Europe (total, excluding UK)	10,700	n/a
UK, Northeast England	4,900	2012
Baltic Sea	4,700	2007
United States	2,600	2008
Ireland	2,100	2012
Norway	1,300	2008
Iceland	1,550	2022
Russia	800	1994
Wadden Sea	600	2014
Total	168,850	n/a

== Behaviour ==
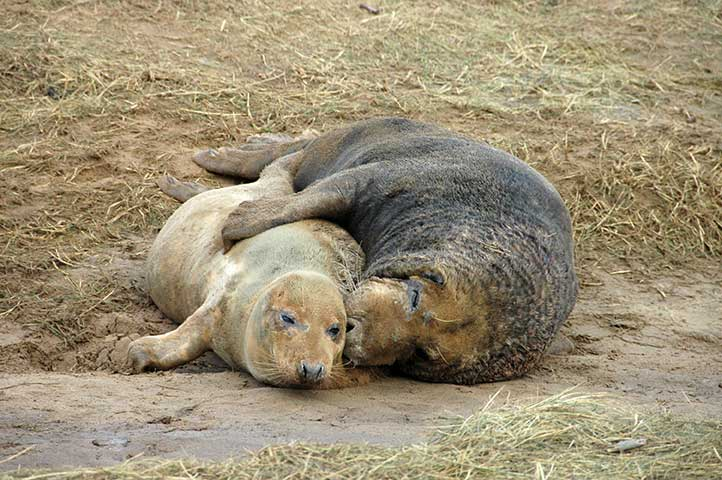
Female (left) and male (right) mating, Donna Nook, England

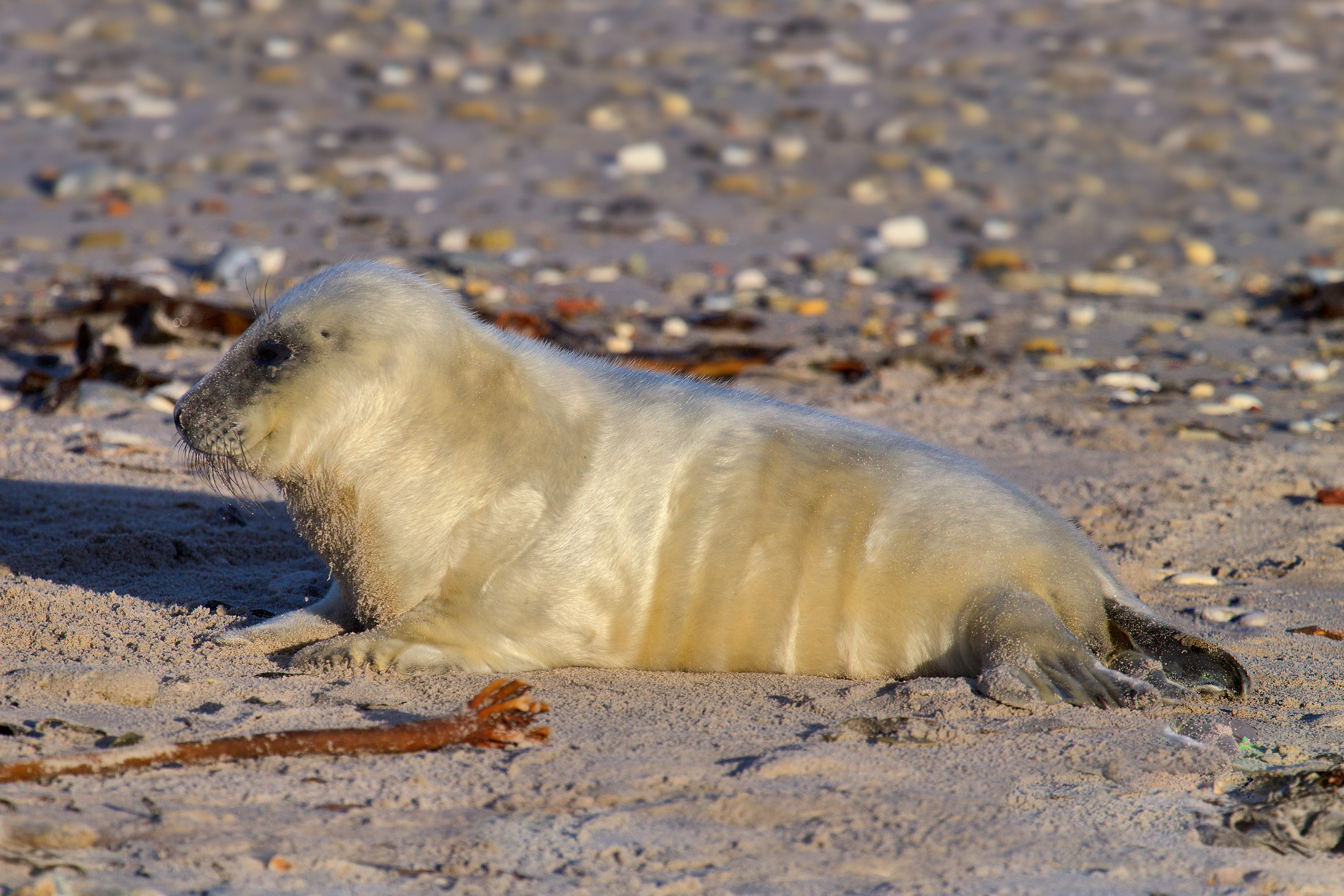
Seal pup a few days after birth, Heligoland, Germany

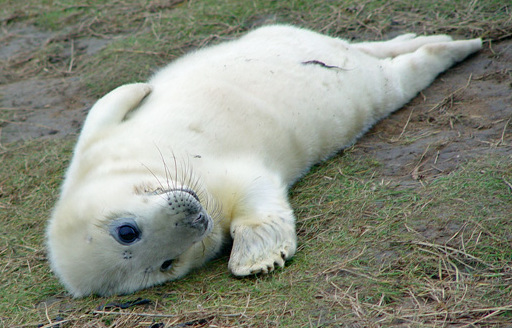
Pups are often a stark white at birth. They shed their entire coat after about 3 weeks, and their new coat is much darker

Grey seals spend most of their time at sea. They can be seen hauled out on rocks, islands, and shoals not far from shore, occasionally coming ashore to rest. The Baltic subspecies most frequently hauls out at night, beginning right after sunset. This may be related to the behaviour of its main prey species, Atlantic herring, which forms large schools during the day and disperses at night.

=== Reproduction ===
Breeding colonies are known as rookeries, and are generally on beaches and remote islands, although in the Baltic and the Gulf of St Lawrence grey seals have been known to occasionally breed on sea ice. Females generally return to the exact location where they were born to give birth, but they sometimes venture to different rookeries.

Females reach sexual maturity at 3–5 years old, while males reach maturity at 6 years. Males, known as bulls, form a territory on the beach, and can mate with more than 6 females, known as cows, a year. Mating can take place on land or in water. The females are pregnant for about 11 and a half months, and give birth to a single pup at the same time each year. Pups weigh 11–20 kg (24–44 lb) at birth, and have dense, soft, silky white fur.

The time of year that pups are born varies depending on the location, landing somewhere between September and March. The earliest pups are born in Ireland and Southwest UK in September. The time at which pups are born along the UK becomes progressively later in a counterclockwise manner; pups are born on the Isles of Scilly and Cornwall in September, in Scotland and the Farne Islands in December, and on the southeast coast in January. In Canada, pups are born in January, and in the Baltic, pupping is in February or March.

All parental care is provided by the female. Males do not provide parental care, but they defend females against other males for mating. During lactation, the pups rapidly fatten up on their mothers' extremely fat-rich milk, quadrupling their body weight in 18 days. The milk can consist of up to 60% fat. After lactation, at about 18–21 days old, they shed their pup fur and grow dense waterproof adult fur, and enter a post-weaning fast for 21 days. After their fast, they leave for the sea to learn to fish for themselves. The pups are precocial, with mothers returning to the sea to forage once pups are weaned. The mother doesn't eat at all while raising their pup, and can lose up to 40% of their weight each breeding season.

Seal pup first-year survival rates are estimated to vary from 80 to 85% to below 50% depending on location and conditions. Starvation due to difficulties in learning to feed appears to be the main cause of pup death.

Male grey seals engage in aggressive sexual behaviour, which can lead to severe injuries and even death for the female. Sometimes they will also target females from other seal species. In the North Sea, multiple cases were recorded of pregnant harbour seals dying as a result of forced copulation with male grey seals.

=== Communication ===
While it was once thought that marine mammals communicate vocally, research conducted by researchers at Monash University shows that grey seals can clap their flippers underwater as a form of communication. This may be used to deter a predator from attacking or to attract a mate. The head researcher, Dr. Burville, had been diving for 17 years in an attempt to capture this behaviour on camera. He stated: "The discovery of 'clapping seals' might not seem that surprising, after all, they're famous for clapping in zoos and aquaria, but where zoo animals are often trained to clap for our entertainment -- these grey seals are doing it in the wild of their own accord."

== Ecology ==
=== Diet ===
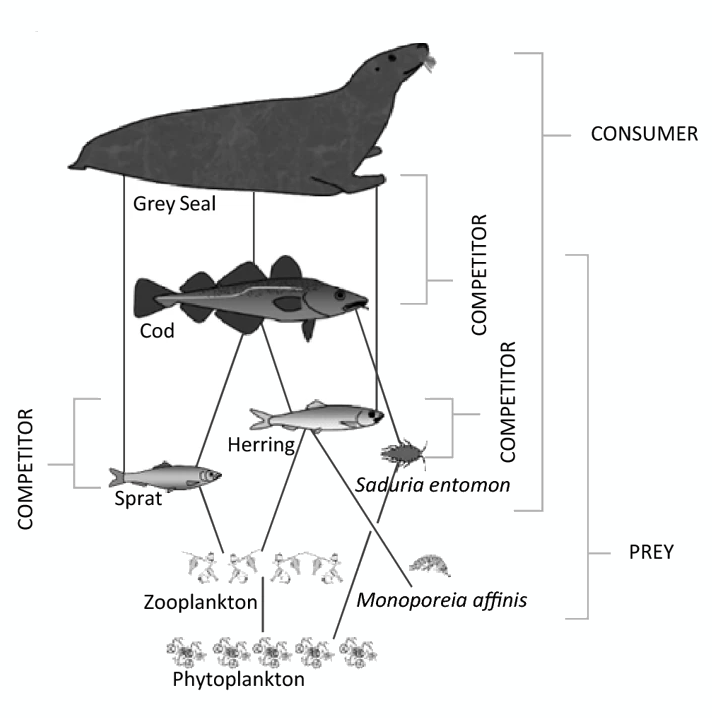
Grey seal food web in the Baltic Sea

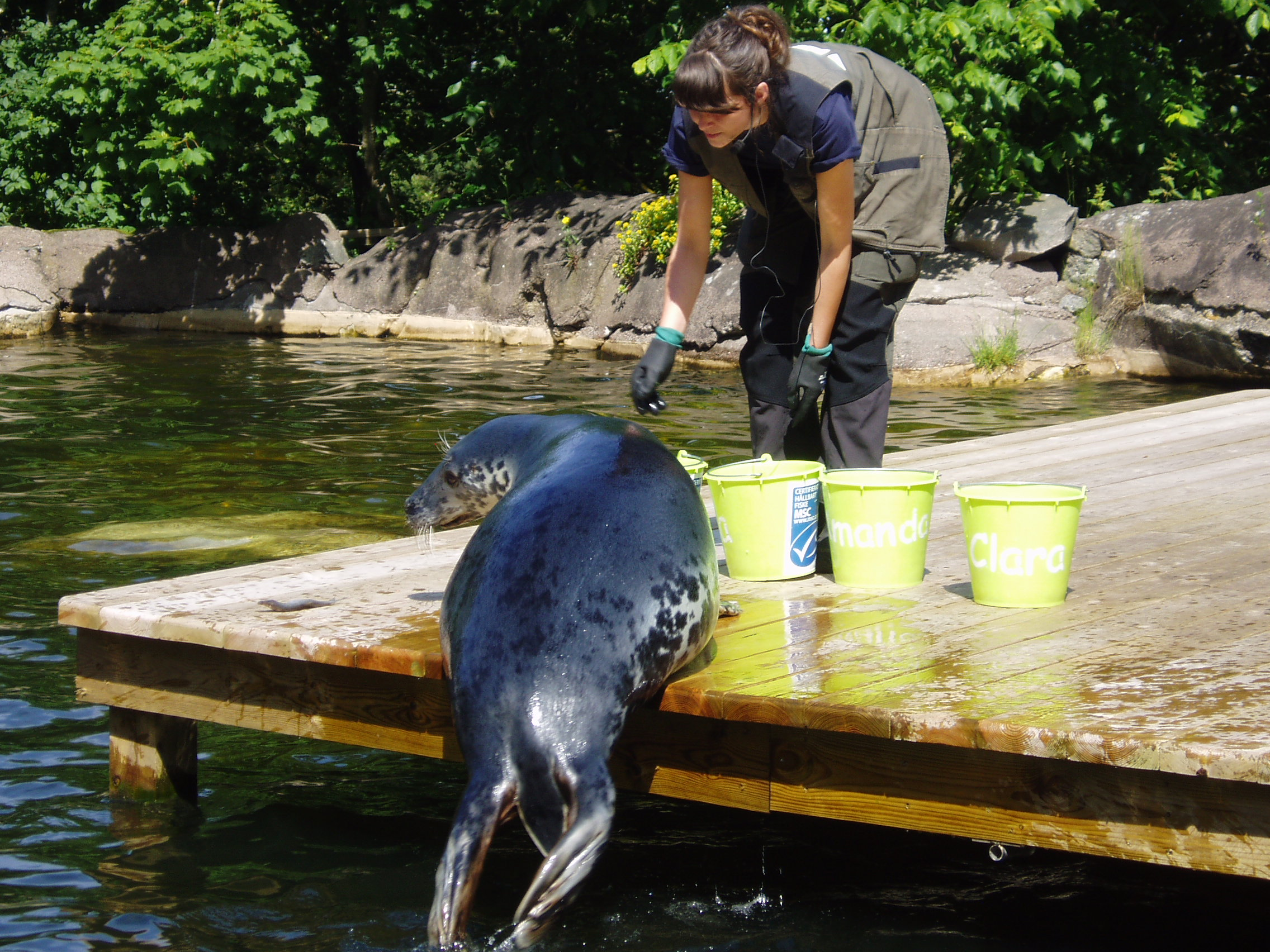
Captive grey seal being fed

The grey seal feeds on a wide variety of fish, mostly benthic or demersal species, taken at depths down to 70 m (230 ft) or more. Sand eels (Ammodytes spp) are important in its diet in many localities. Cod and other gadids, flatfish, herring, wrasse and skates are also important locally. However, it is clear that the grey seal will eat whatever is available, including octopus and lobsters. The average daily food requirement is estimated to be 5 kg (11 lb), though the seal does not feed every day and it fasts during the breeding season.

Observations and studies from Scotland, The Netherlands, and Germany show that grey seals will also prey and feed on large animals like harbour seals and harbour porpoises. In 2014, a male grey seal in the North Sea was documented and filmed killing and cannibalising 11 pups of his own species over the course of a week. Similar wounds on the carcasses of pups found elsewhere in the region suggest that cannibalism and infanticide may not be uncommon in grey seals. Male grey seals may engage in such behaviour potentially as a way of increasing reproductive success through access to easy prey without leaving prime territory.

In 2026, a number of instances of grey seals being recorded hunting, killing and partially eating common dolphins (Delphinus delphis) off the coasts of Devon and West Wales, as well as in the Irish Sea, were recorded. It is currently not known why the seals are hunting dolphins; however, it has been theorised that the attacks may be the work of a single population or family of seals operating between North Devon and the Welsh coastline. The seals may also be shifting from hunting harbour porpoises to common dolphins due to the latter species undergoing a significant population increase, becoming the most common species of cetacean in the area where the attacks are taking place.

=== Predators ===
Grey seals are vulnerable to the typical predators of seals; their primary predator is the orca. Certain large species of sharks are known to prey on grey seals in North American waters, particularly great white sharks and bull sharks. Some grey seal carcasses have washed ashore with visible "cookie cutter" bite marks, a telltale sign of attack by a Greenland shark. In the waters of Great Britain, grey seals are a common prey species for orcas. In the Baltic, grey seal pups are prey for white-tailed eagles and great black-backed gulls.

=== Pests and diseases ===
In a study of 38 adult grey seal bodies stranded on the coasts of England and Wales, the most common cause of death was bacterial pneumonia. The most common cause of pneumonia was Streptococcus spp.. Notably, most of the seals had incidental non-fatal parasitic diseases; 76% of the seals had nematodes in their stomachs, 66% had Acanthocephala infections, and 37% had mites in their nose.

== Relationship with humans ==
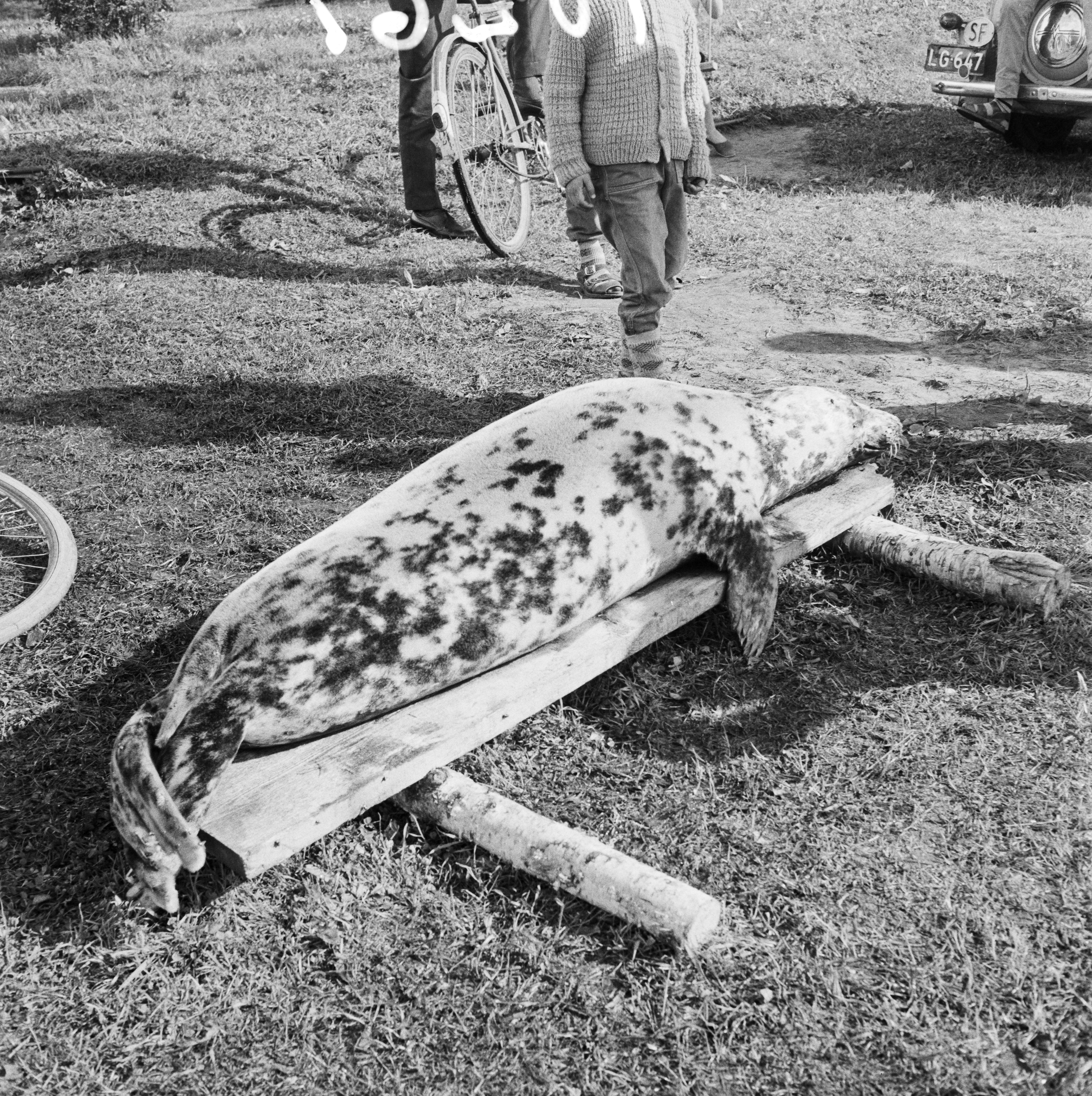
A hunted grey seal, 1961, Finland

=== Hunting and culling ===
Grey seals were nearly extirpated in the United States from hunting for oil, meat, and skins. Bounties were paid on all kinds of seals up until 1945 in Maine and 1962 in Massachusetts. In 2013, there were calls by fishermen in Cape Cod to cull the rising grey seal population, over concerns it was harming the local cod catch.

In 2012, there was a controversial suggestion to cull 70,000 grey seals in the Gulf of St. Lawrence. This was spurred by predictions that the local cod population would be extirpated, with the primary cause attributed to grey seals. However, as of 2026, no such cull has taken place.

In 2009, the EU banned the import and sale of seal-based products, including grey seal. As of 2026, grey seal hunting is legal in all countries on the Baltic Sea. As of 2024, about 1,500 Baltic grey seals are killed annually. Between 2019–2022, 3,774 grey seals were hunted in Sweden, making it the largest hunter of seals in the EU. In 2026, the quota for grey seals in Sweden was 1,350 — up from 1,000 the previous year.

In Norway, grey seal hunting is legal, and seals are hunted as game. In Iceland, grey seal hunting is banned, however, a license can be issued for personal, subsistence hunting. There is no tradition of grey seal hunting in the Faroe Islands, where there has been virtually no seal hunting since the 1960s.

Seal hunting is not a common practice in the UK, where it is illegal to kill seals. However, licenses can be granted for culling in specific circumstances. Culling regulations in the UK as a whole are governed by the Conservation of Seals Act 1970, however each individual region can decide its own laws. In England, Wales, and Scotland, licenses to cull seals can be granted to protect flora and fauna, to reduce population surplus, and to protect public safety. In 2021, the Marine (Scotland) Act was amended, which repealed the ability to grant licenses for prevention of damage to Scottish fish farms. In Scotland, 62 grey seals were legally shot under license in 2020.

In 2022, the Cornish Mackerel Fishermen group called for a cull in Cornwall, referring to grey seals as "rats of the sea". This was met with heavy backlash from marine conservation groups.

=== Conservation and recovery ===
A short video on monitoring and conservation of grey seals on Skomer Island, Wales

After near extirpation in the United States, sightings began to increase in the late 1980s. One year after Congress passed the 1972 Marine Mammal Protection Act preventing the harming or harassing of seals, a survey of the entire Maine coast found only 30 grey seals. At first grey seal populations increased slowly but then rebounded from islands off Maine to Monomoy Island and Nantucket Island off of southern Cape Cod. The southernmost breeding colony was established on Muskeget Island with five pups born in 1988 and over 2,000 counted in 2008. According to a genetics study, the United States population has formed as a result of recolonisation by Canadian seals. By 2009, thousands of grey seals had taken up residence on or near popular swimming beaches on outer Cape Cod, resulting in sightings of great white sharks drawn close to shore to hunt the seals. A count of 15,756 grey seals in southeastern Massachusetts coastal waters was made in 2011 by the National Marine Fisheries Service. In 1997, a grey seal was recorded for the first time in North Carolina. Grey seals are being seen increasingly in New York and New Jersey waters.

The Canadian population was estimated to be 366,400 in 2021, increasing at an average rate of 1.5% per year in 2016–2021. However, the rate of population increase has declined in recent years, and 2021 was the first time in 60 years that the amount of pups being born on Sable Island had decreased.

Grey seal populations have been expanding rapidly in the UK, likely owing to changes in food availability due to climate change. There are now an estimated 157,000 individuals in the wild.

The Icelandic population was estimated to be 6,697 in 2022; this is a 27% decrease from 1982. However, population numbers have remained relatively unchanged since 2005.

The population in the Baltic Sea increased about 8% per year between 1990 and the mid-2000s, with the numbers becoming stagnant since 2005. Some anthropogenic causes of death include drowning in fishing gear and hunting.

Seal rescue groups often take in malnourished pups abandoned by their mothers. Human noise pollution continues to affect marine-life communication but remains an understudied facet of marine conservation efforts. In more recent years, the potential negative effect of human noise has been highlighted with the discovery of seals using clapping as a form of communication. In Northern Ireland, it is illegal to intentionally or recklessly disturb a seal.

=== In captivity ===
Grey seals are adaptable to life in captivity, and are commonly found as zoo animals around their native range, particularly in Europe. Grey seals need a minimum of 30 m^{2} (320 sq ft) land area and 120 m^{2} (1,300 sq ft) pool area with a minimum depth of 2.3 m (7 ft 7 in). Caution needs to be taken when handling grey seals, as they are capable of delivering strong bites.

=== Seal watching ===
Seal watching is a popular activity, with strong economic and touristic benefits. 80,000 people are estimated to visit Horsey Beach for seal watching each year. Seals are the third biggest reason why people visit the Scottish coast for wildlife viewing. In 2003, researchers estimated the economic value of grey seal tourism in Southwest England to be £526,000 per year (equivalent to £962,000 in 2025).

Care must be taken that seal watching does not disturb the seals. The biggest cause of seal watching related disturbance is private watercraft. Dogs walked by seal-watchers can cause seals to stampede and suddenly enter water, where they can experience thermal shock. At Blakeney Point, which is cordoned off during pupping season, a webcam has been installed, to allow for seal watching without the possibility of disturbance.
