= Winterton Dunes =

Dune system in Norfolk, England

Coordinates: 52.7266°N 1.6873°E

Winterton Dunes is an extensive dune system on the east coast of Norfolk, England, which has been designated as a National Nature Reserve of 109 ha. Winterton Dunes is within the Norfolk Coast AONB.

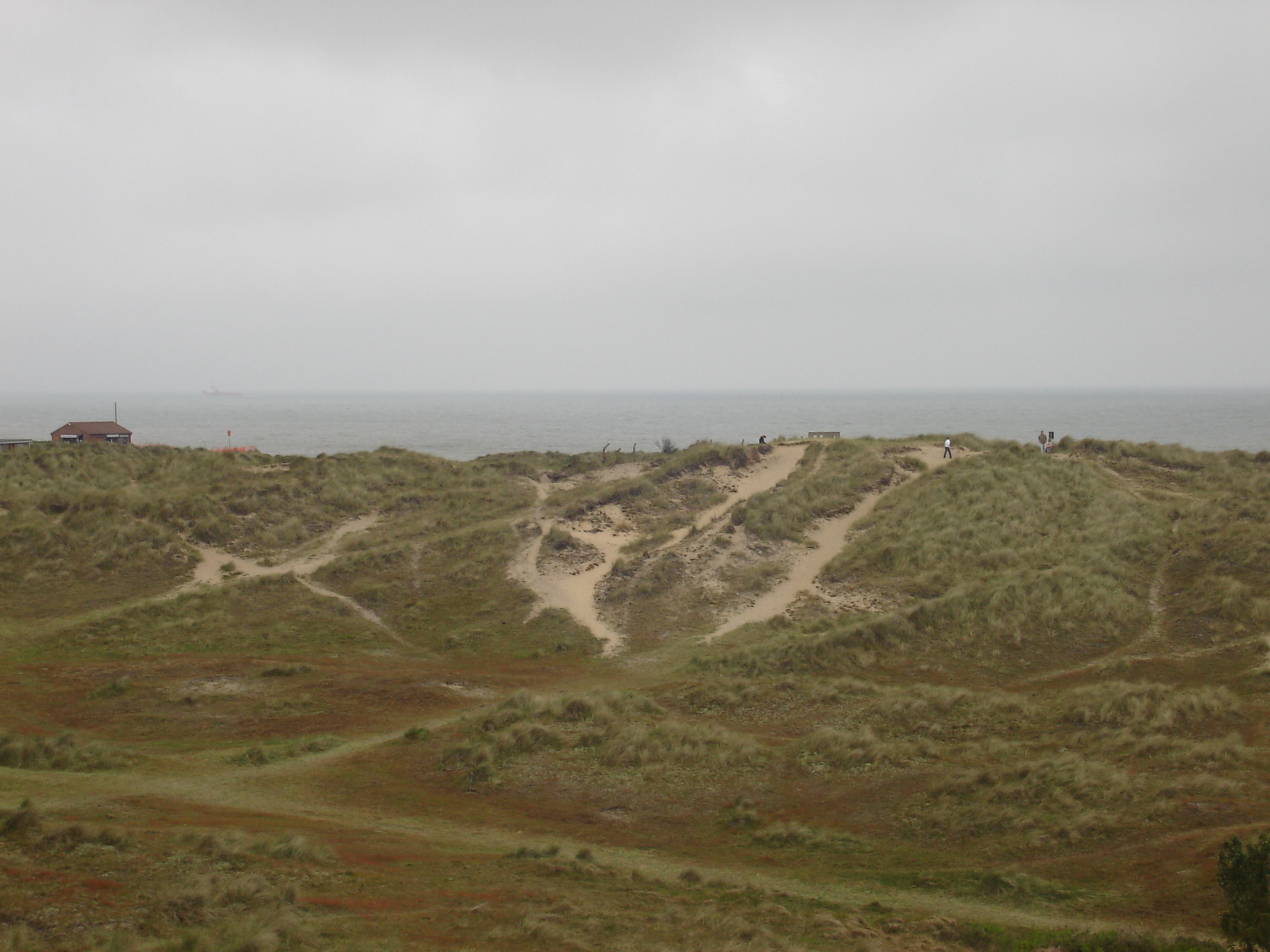
Winterton Dunes

The site is unusual in that it shows greater ecological similarities to the dune systems of the Baltic - which support acidic plant communities - rather than the dunes on the North Norfolk Coast - where the sand is calcareous.

The site supports well developed areas of dune heath, wet 'slacks' between dunes and dune grassland which grades into grazing marsh and birch woodland.

== Fauna ==
Natterjack toads breed in shallow pools within the site. The site, along with the adjoining Horsey Dunes, hosts the largest colonies of dark green fritillary and grayling butterflies in Norfolk. Other butterflies recorded from here in numbers include small copper and common blue.

The ponds among the dunes are home to many dragonflies including the common hawker - which is rare in Norfolk.

Winterton Dunes is also known as the first site in Britain where the southern emerald damselfly occurred (Nobes 2003).

After a count in 2014 by the RSPB they found that the dunes are the home to more than 300 pairs of the little tern making it the UK's largest colony.
