= Winterton Ness =

Headland in Norfolk, England

Coordinates: 52°44′10″N 01°40′50″E

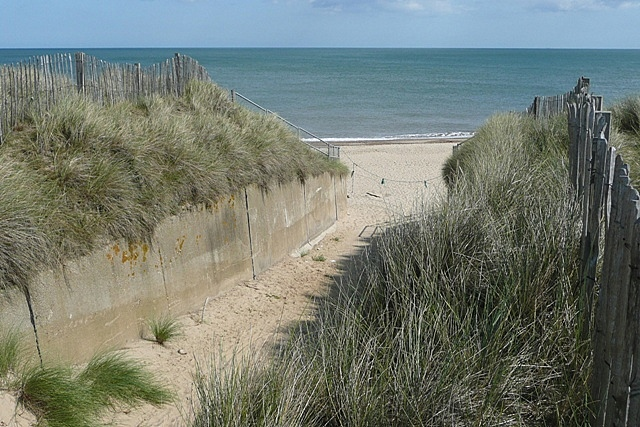
Beach access at Winterton Ness

Winterton Ness is an area of foreland on the North Norfolk coast of England.

Winterton Ness is located to the north of the village of Winterton-on-Sea between grid reference TG489216 in the north to TG506181 to its south. Technically it is a narrow cuspate foreland with a high obtuse angle between its two shorelines. A number of studies appear inconclusive as to the nature of erosion or, conversely, accretion of sediment in the area.

The area was described by Daniel Defoe during the first of his trips for his account A Tour thro' the Whole Island of Great Britain. It is also mentioned by Defoe in Robinson Crusoe.
