= Norfolk Coast National Landscape =

Protected area in Norfolk, England

Coordinates: 52.97°N 0.98°E

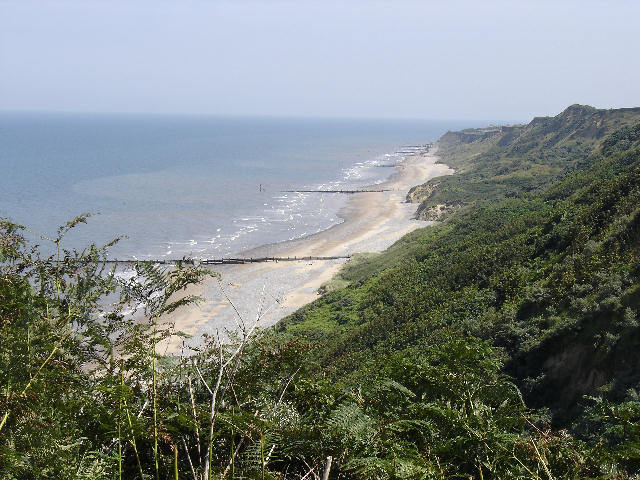
- The Norfolk Coast east of Cromer

- Location of the Norfolk Coast AONB in the UK
- Location: Norfolk, England
- Established: 1968
- Website: norfolkcoast.org

The Norfolk Coast National Landscape is a protected National Landscape in Norfolk, England. It covers over 450 km^{2} of coastal and agricultural land from The Wash in the west through coastal marshes and cliffs to the sand dunes at Winterton in the east. It was designated an Area of Outstanding Natural Beauty (AONB) in 1968, under the National Parks and Access to the Countryside Act 1949.

The area includes Hunstanton, Wells-next-the-Sea, Blakeney, Sheringham, Cromer and Mundesley. The AONB boundary on the seaward side is the mean low water mark, corresponding to the limit of the planning authority of its local authority partners. The terrain behind the coast is rolling chalk land and glacial moraine, including the almost 300-foot (90m) high Cromer Ridge.

Nature reserves in the area include two National Nature Reserves, Blakeney Point and the Winterton Dunes (one of the country's finest dune systems). The Heritage Coast stretch of the AONB is a Site of Special Scientific Interest, a candidate Special Area of Conservation (SAC) and a Special Protection Area. The Peddars Way and Norfolk Coast Path National Trail pass through the AONB.

Together with the Wash and North Norfolk Marine Protected Area Network and Norfolk Coast Path National Trail, the three are branded together as the Norfolk Coast Protected Area.

== Threats ==
East of Weybourne there is severe coastal erosion. Managed retreat is likely to be the long-term solution to rising sea levels along much of the rest of the North Norfolk coast,

== Hills ==
The NL is a low-lying area, with only three summits of more than 30 metres topographic prominence within its bounds.

Hill	Height	Prominence	Grid reference
Beacon Hill (Cromer)	105.1 m (345 ft)	79 m	TG183414
Beacon Hill (Trimingham)	69.8 m (229 ft)	30.3 m	TG288383
Knights Hill	51.3 m (168 ft)	31 m	TF667231
