= Number One =

Number One most commonly refers to:

- 1, the number, numeral, and glyph
- Number one (record charts), or variants thereof, the top/best-selling position on a record chart or any similar chart

Number One, No. 1, #1 or Numero Uno may also refer to:

== Arts and media ==
=== Music ===
==== Albums ====
- Number 1 (Big Bang album)
- No. 1 (BoA album)
- No.1 (EP), by CLC
- n.1 (David Carreira album)
- #1 (Fischerspooner album)
- Number One (Billie Godfrey album)
- #1 (Linda Király album)
- Number One (Pist.On album)
- Number One (M Trill album)
- Number One (My Chemical Romance EP)
- No1 (Nikolija album)
- Number 1 (O-Zone album), and the title song
- Number One (Racine album)
- Number One (Sanchez album)
- #1 (Stacy album)
- No. 1 (Teen Top album)
- The Beatles (No. 1), by the Beatles
- #1, by Felix

==== Songs ====
- "No.1" (BoA song)
- "No.1" (Uverworld song)
- "Numba 1" (Tide Is High), by Kardinal Offishall
- "Number 1" (Goldfrapp song)
- "Number 1" (Tinchy Stryder song)
- "Number One" (Alexia song)
- "Number One" (John Legend song)
- "Number One" (Pharrell Williams song)
- "Number One" (R. Kelly song)
- "Number One" (Skye Sweetnam song)
- "#1" (Nelly song)
- "#1", by Animal Collective
- "#1", by Dev
- "#1", by Imagine Dragons from Mercury – Act 1
- "#1", by Kelly Rowland from Talk a Good Game
- "No. 1", by Kana Nishino from Secret Collection: Green
- "No. 1", from the television series Tweenies
- "Number 1", by Big Bang from Number 1
- "Number One", by A from How Ace Are Buildings
- "Number One", by Al Lindsay from the Thrillville: Off the Rails in-game soundtrack
- "Number One", by Billie Godfrey from Number One
- "Number One", by Chaz Jankel from Looking at You
- "Number One", by E.Y.C. from Express Yourself Clearly
- "Number One", by Gentle Giant from Civilian
- "Number One", by Heavenly from Coming from the Sky
- "Number One", by Helloween from Pink Bubbles Go Ape
- "Number One", by Jamie Foxx from Intuition
- "Number One", by Lower Than Atlantis from the self-titled album
- "Number One", by Playgroup
- "Number One", by The Rutles
- "Number One", by Tadpole from The Buddhafinger
- "Number 1", by Tembalami
- "Number One", by Zzbra from Zzbra: Original Motion Picture Soundtrack, 2012
- "Numero Uno" (Starlight song), 1988, by Italian act Starlight

==== Other uses in music ====
- Number One (guitar), the main instrument used by Stevie Ray Vaughan

=== Film ===
- Number One (1969 film), starring Charlton Heston
- Number One (1973 film), an Italian language film
- Number One (1994 film), an Indian Telugu-language film
- No. 1, an Indian film series starring Govinda, directed by David Dhawan and produced by Vashu Bhagnani
  - Coolie No. 1 (1995 film)
  - Hero No. 1 (1997)
  - Aunty No. 1 (1998)
  - Anari No. 1 (1999)
  - Biwi No.1 (1999)
  - Beti No. 1 (2000)
  - Jodi No.1 (film) (2001)
  - Shaadi No. 1 (2005)
  - Coolie No. 1 (2020 film)
- Number One (2017 film), a French film
- Number 1 (2020 film), a Singaporean film
- Number One (2026 film), a South Korean film
- Number One films starring by Shakib Khan
  - Number One Shakib Khan (2010)
  - Number One Shakib Khan (initialism as NO1SK), widely referred as Shakib Khan after the film
  - Boss Number One (2011)
  - Tiger Number One (2011)
  - Don Number One (2012)
  - Premik Number One (2013)

=== Characters ===
- Number One (Artemis Fowl), a demon character in the Artemis Fowl novel series
- Number One (Babylon 5), a recurring character in the TV series Babylon 5
- Number One (Golgafrinchan), a character from The Hitchhiker's Guide to the Galaxy by Douglas Adams
- Number One (The Prisoner), a character in the television series The Prisoner
- Number One (Star Trek), the nickname of the Enterprise second-in-command character in the first pilot episode of Star Trek and its spin-offs Star Trek: Discovery and Star Trek: Strange New Worlds
- "Number One", Captain Picard's frequent way of addressing William Riker in Star Trek: The Next Generation
- Number One, Picard's pit bull in Star Trek: Picard
- John Cavil (Number One), a character in the reimagined version of Battlestar Galactica
- Ernst Stavro Blofeld (Number 1), chief of SPECTRE in James Bond novels and films
- Number One, a character in the novel series H.I.V.E. by Mark Walden
- Number One, the head of the Stonecutters in the Simpsons episode "Homer the Great"
- Numbuh 1, leader of Sector V, from Codename: Kids Next Door

=== Other arts and media ===
- Number One (video), 2005, by Greek singer Elena Paparizou
- "Number One", an episode of My Name Is Earl
- El Número Uno, a Spanish TV talent show
- Gangwon No.1 Broadcasting, a radio and television broadcaster in Gangwon Province, South Korea
- No 1 (Royal Red and Blue), a 1954 painting by Mark Rothko
- Number 1 (painting), by Jackson Pollock
- Number One (magazine), a UK music magazine
- Number 1, a book by Billy Martin and Peter Golenbock

== Other uses ==
- No. 1 (yacht), assisted by an electric motor that gets its electricity from hydrogen fuel cells
- Number One, Kentucky, a community in the US
- Number One (New Caledonian beer)
- Number 1, a euphemism for urination
- Rifle, Number 1, a British rifle
- Ruger No. 1, an American rifle
- 1 (New York City Subway service), a subway line in the New York City Subway

== See also ==
- Number 1s (disambiguation)
- One (disambiguation)
- Number Two (disambiguation)
- Music-specific further disambiguation:
  - Bachata Number 1's (disambiguation)
  - Cello Concerto No. 1 (disambiguation)
  - Cello Sonata No. 1 (disambiguation)
  - Clarinet Concerto No. 1 (disambiguation)
  - Mass No. 1 (disambiguation)
  - Piano Concerto No. 1 (disambiguation)
  - Piano Quintet No. 1 (disambiguation)
  - Piano Sonata No. 1 (disambiguation)
  - First Rhapsody (disambiguation)
  - String Quartet No. 1 (disambiguation)
  - Symphony No. 1 (disambiguation)
  - Untitled No. 1 (disambiguation)
  - Violin Concerto No. 1 (disambiguation)
  - Violin Sonata No. 1 (disambiguation)
  - Category:Number-one singles
- Other ambiguous things that might be referred to as "Number One":
  - Fire Station No. 1 (disambiguation)
  - No. 1 Middle School (disambiguation)
  - 1 Squadron (disambiguation)
  - Township No. 1 (disambiguation)
  - 1st Wing (disambiguation)
  - World number 1 (disambiguation)
  - List of highways numbered 1
  - List of public transport routes numbered 1
- Coolie No. 1 (disambiguation)
- Number One Fan (disambiguation)
- Jodi No.1 (disambiguation)
- Lesson No.1 (disambiguation)
- Looking Out for Number One (disambiguation)
- My Number One (disambiguation)
- Public Enemy No. 1 (disambiguation)
- To Be Number One (disambiguation)
