= Point Lookout =

Point Lookout may refer to:

== Places ==
- Point Lookout (Colorado), a mountain in Mesa Verde National Park
- Point Lookout (New South Wales), a mountain in New South Wales
- Point Lookout, Maryland
  - Point Lookout State Park, Maryland, site of an American Civil War prisoner of war camp
- Point Lookout, Missouri
- Point Lookout, New York
- Point Lookout, Virginia
- Point Lookout, Pleasants County, West Virginia
- Point Lookout, Queensland, the headland and village in Australia
- Point Lookout Archaeological Site, Gloucester County, Virginia
- Point Lookout Cemetery in the Louisiana State Penitentiary (also known as "Angola")
- Point Lookout Sandstone

== Lighthouses ==
- Point Lookout Light, Australia
- Point Lookout Light, Maryland, US

== See also ==
- Point Lookout, Australia (disambiguation)
- Point (disambiguation)
- Lookout (disambiguation)
