= Fire Station No. 1 =

Fire Station No. 1, and variations, may refer to:

in Australia

- No. 1 Fire Station (Perth, Western Australia), a historic fire station in Australia

in the United States

- Fayetteville Fire Department Fire Station 1, Fayetteville, Arkansas, listed on the National Register of Historic Places (NRHP)
- Fire Station No. 1 (Los Angeles, California), List of Los Angeles Historic-Cultural Monuments on the East and Northeast Sides
- Santa Ana Fire Station Headquarters No. 1, Santa Ana, California, NRHP-listed
- Engine Company 1 Fire Station, Hartford, Connecticut, NRHP-listed
- Fire Station No. 1 (Denver, Colorado), NRHP-listed
- Engine Company Number One (Augusta, Georgia), NRHP-listed
- Fire Station No. 1 (Muncie, Indiana), NRHP-listed
- Des Moines Fire Department Headquarters' Fire Station No. 1 and Shop Building, Des Moines, Iowa, NRHP-listed
- Fire House No. 1 (Duluth, Minnesota), NRHP-listed, also known as "Engine House No. 1"
- Pascagoula Central Fire Station No. 1, Pascagoula, Mississippi, NRHP-listed
- Engine Company No. 1 and No. 30, Pittsburgh, Pennsylvania
- Fire Museum of Memphis, in former Fire Engine House No. 1, Memphis, Tennessee
- Fire Hall No. 1 (Nashville, Tennessee), NRHP-listed, also known as the "George W. Swint Sr. Engine Company No. 1" and as ""Germantown Fire Hall"
- Fire Station No. 1 (Roanoke, Virginia), NRHP-listed
- Fire Station No. 1 (Tacoma, Washington), NRHP-listed

== See also ==
- List of fire stations
