= Point Lookout, Australia =

Point Lookout, Australia may refer to:

- Point Lookout, Queensland, a headland and coastal village
- Point Lookout Light, Australia, a lighthouse in Point Lookout, Queensland
- Point Lookout (New South Wales), a mountain

== See also ==
- Point Lookout (disambiguation)
