= Looking Out for Number One =

Look Out for Number One (#1) or Looking Out for Number One (#1) may refer to:

== Music ==
- "Lookin' Out for #1" (Bachman–Turner Overdrive song), 1976
- "Looking Out for Number One" (Travis Tritt song), 1993
- "Looking Out for Number One" (Laura Branigan song), 1981
- "Lookin' Out for Number One", a song by Cheap Trick on the 1982 album One on One
- "Lookin' Out for Number One", a song by Honeymoon Suite on the 1988 album Racing After Midnight
- "Looking Out For Number One", a song by Dwarves on the album The Dwarves Are Born Again
- "Looking Out For #1", a song by Bamboo on the 2008 album Tomorrow Becomes Yesterday
- "Looking Out for #1", a song by Guttermouth on the 2002 album Gusto
- "Looking Out for Number One", a 1980 single by Mariska Veres
- Look Out for #1, a 1976 album by Brothers Johnson
- "Look Out for Number One", a song by Tommy Faragher on the soundtrack for the 1983 film Staying Alive

== Film, television, and radio ==
- "Looking Out for Number One", an episode from the fourth season of Ellen
- "Look Out for Number One", an episode from the sixth season of Orange Is the New Black
- "Looking Out For #1", an episode of the radio series Under the Influence

== Literature ==
- Looking Out for #1, a 1978 book by Robert Ringer
- Looking Out for Number One, a 1989 autobiography by Dave Semenko

== See also ==
- "Looking After Number One", a 1997 television episode
- Number One (disambiguation)
- Lookout (disambiguation)
- Look Out (disambiguation)
