= Piano Sonata No. 1 =

Piano Sonata No. 1, the default title for a composer's first (or only) piano sonata, may refer to:

- Piano Sonata (Barber), Op. 26, by Samuel Barber
- Piano Sonata (Barraqué), by Jean Barraqué
- Piano Sonata (Bartók), Sz. 80, by Béla Bartók
- Piano Sonata No. 1 (Beethoven), Op. 2, No. 1, by Ludwig van Beethoven
- Piano Sonata (Berg), Op. 1, by Alban Berg
- Piano Sonata (Bernstein), by Leonard Bernstein
- Piano Sonata No. 1 (Boulez), 1946, by Pierre Boulez
- Piano Sonata No. 1 (Brahms), Op. 1, by Johannes Brahms
- Piano Sonata No. 1 (Chopin), Op. 4, by Frédéric Chopin
- Piano Sonata (Dukas), by Paul Dukas
- Piano Sonata (Dutilleux), by Henri Dutilleux
- Piano Sonata No. 1 (Enescu), Op. 24, by George Enescu
- Piano Sonata (Grieg), Op. 7, by Edvard Grieg
- Piano Sonata No. 1 (Hindemith), by Paul Hindemith
- Piano Sonata in B minor (Liszt), S. 178, by Franz Liszt
- Piano Sonata (Martinů), H. 350, by Bohuslav Martinů
- Piano Sonata No. 1 (Mozart), K. 279, by Wolfgang Amadeus Mozart
- Piano Sonata No. 1 (Prokofiev), Op. 1, by Sergei Prokofiev
- Piano Sonata No. 1 (Rachmaninoff), Op. 28, by Sergei Rachmaninoff
- Piano Sonata (Reubke), by Julius Reubke
- Piano Sonata No. 1 (Schumann), Op. 11, by Robert Schumann
- Piano Sonata No. 1 (Scriabin), Op. 6, by Alexander Scriabin
- Piano Sonata in F-sharp minor (Stravinsky), 1904, an early composition long thought to have been lost, by Igor Stravinsky
- Piano Sonata (Stravinsky), 1924, by Igor Stravinsky
- Piano Sonata No. 1 (Vine), 1990, by Carl Vine

or possibly

- 1. X. 1905 (also "Sonata"), by Leoš Janáček

== See also ==
- Cello Sonata No. 1 (disambiguation)
- Violin Sonata No. 1 (disambiguation)
