= Titchwell Marsh =

Nature reserve in the United Kingdom

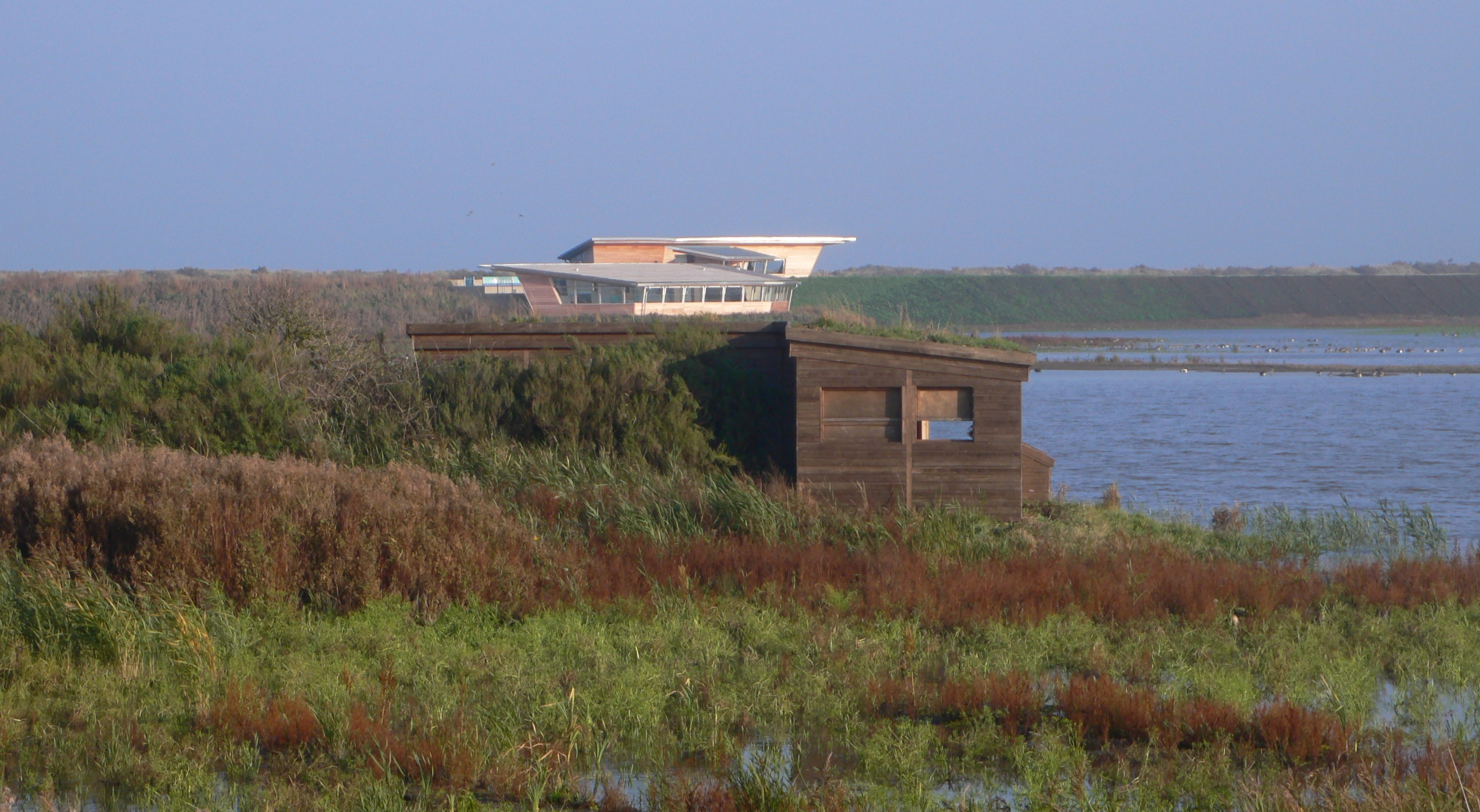
- Freshwater lagoon seen from west bank, with Island Hide in the foreground, and the Parrinder wall and hides further back

- Location within Norfolk
- Location: Norfolk, East of England, England
- Coordinates: 52.9628°N 0.603893°E
- Area: 171 hectares (420 acres)
- Website: www.rspb.org.uk/titchwell

Titchwell Marsh is an English nature reserve owned and managed by the Royal Society for the Protection of Birds (RSPB). Located on the north coast of the county of Norfolk, between the villages of Titchwell and Thornham, about 8 km (5.0 mi) east of the seaside resort of Hunstanton, its 171 hectares (420 acres) include reed beds, saltmarshes, a freshwater lagoon and sandy beach, with a small woodland area near the car park. This internationally important reserve is part of the North Norfolk Coast Site of Special Scientific Interest (SSSI) and the Norfolk Coast Area of Outstanding Natural Beauty (AONB), and is also protected through Natura 2000, Special Protection Area (SPA) and Ramsar listings.

The reserve is important for some scarce breeding birds, such as pied avocets on the islands, and western marsh harriers, Eurasian bitterns and bearded reedlings in the reeds. To encourage bitterns to breed, the reed beds have been improved to make them wetter, and the lagoon has been stocked with the common rudd. Typical wetland birds such as the water rail, reed warbler and sedge warbler also appear, and little egrets are common. The reserve has regularly attracted rarities, as its location is important for migrating birds. Ducks and geese winter at Titchwell in considerable numbers, and the reserve shelters the endangered European water vole.

Facilities include three bird hides, a seawatching platform, two nature trails, and a visitor centre. Because of concerns about climate change, a major project in 2010 and 2011 brought improvements to the banks around the freshwater lagoon and the conversion of the brackish lagoon to tidal saltmarsh, a more effective barrier to encroachment by the sea.

Titchwell Marsh is archaeologically significant, with artefacts dating back to the Upper Paleolithic, and has remains of military constructions from both world wars. These include brickwork from a First World War military hospital and 1940s artillery targets for armoured fighting vehicles and warplanes in the Second World War.

== History ==
=== Before 1972 ===
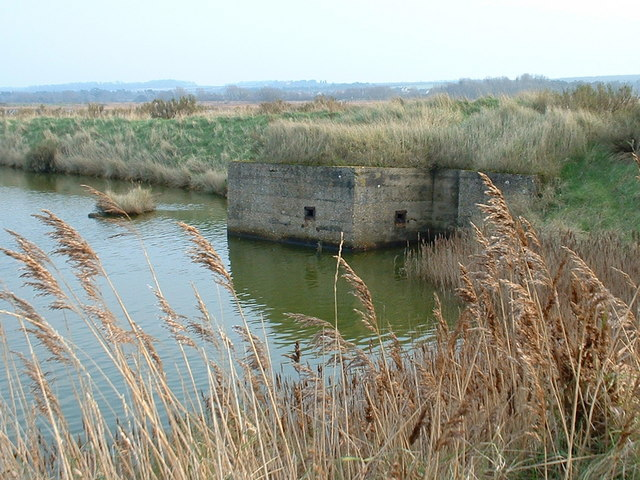
Remains of Second World War coastal defences

Titchwell has a long history of human occupation. Populations of both Modern and Neanderthal people were present in Norfolk before the last glaciation between 100,000 and 10,000 years ago, and returned as the ice retreated north. The archaeological record is poor until about 20,000 years ago, partly due to the prevailing conditions, but also because the coastline was much further north than at present, so that many sites are now under the sea. Early Mesolithic flint tools with characteristic blades up to 15 cm (5.9 in) long found on the present-day coast at Titchwell date from a time when it was 60–70 km (37–43 mi) from the sea. Other flint tools have been found dating from the Upper Paleolithic to the Neolithic. As the ice retreated during the Mesolithic, the sea level rose, filling what is now the North Sea, and bringing the Norfolk coastline much closer to its present line; the remains of submerged forests can still be detected at low tide. By 11,000 BC, the makers of the long blades had gone, and peat marshes had formed behind an offshore barrier island or spit. A layer of peat formed between 1920 and 1680 BC and another between 1020 and 830 BC, indicating marshy conditions; polished Neolithic axes found in those layers were blackened by exposure to the peat.

Two possible timber platforms were identified within the peat at Titchwell, and may be prehistoric. Similar Bronze Age structures are rare, and they may be significant in providing information about early timber construction methods. Medieval and later pottery has been found at Titchwell, and the peat and silts which overlay the sediments deposited by the retreating glaciers have signs of post-medieval ploughing.

The draining of Norfolk's coastal marshes commenced in the late 17th and 18th centuries, and sea defences including the "Old Lord's Bank" at Titchwell were shown in maps from 1786 and 1797. For the next 170 years or so, the reclaimed marsh was arable, producing crops and beef cattle. A huge influx of Pallas's sandgrouse into Britain in 1853 led to several arrivals at Titchwell, including mated pairs. The last bird seen was on the saltmarsh, and the rest were on the dunes or in marram grass; many were shot.

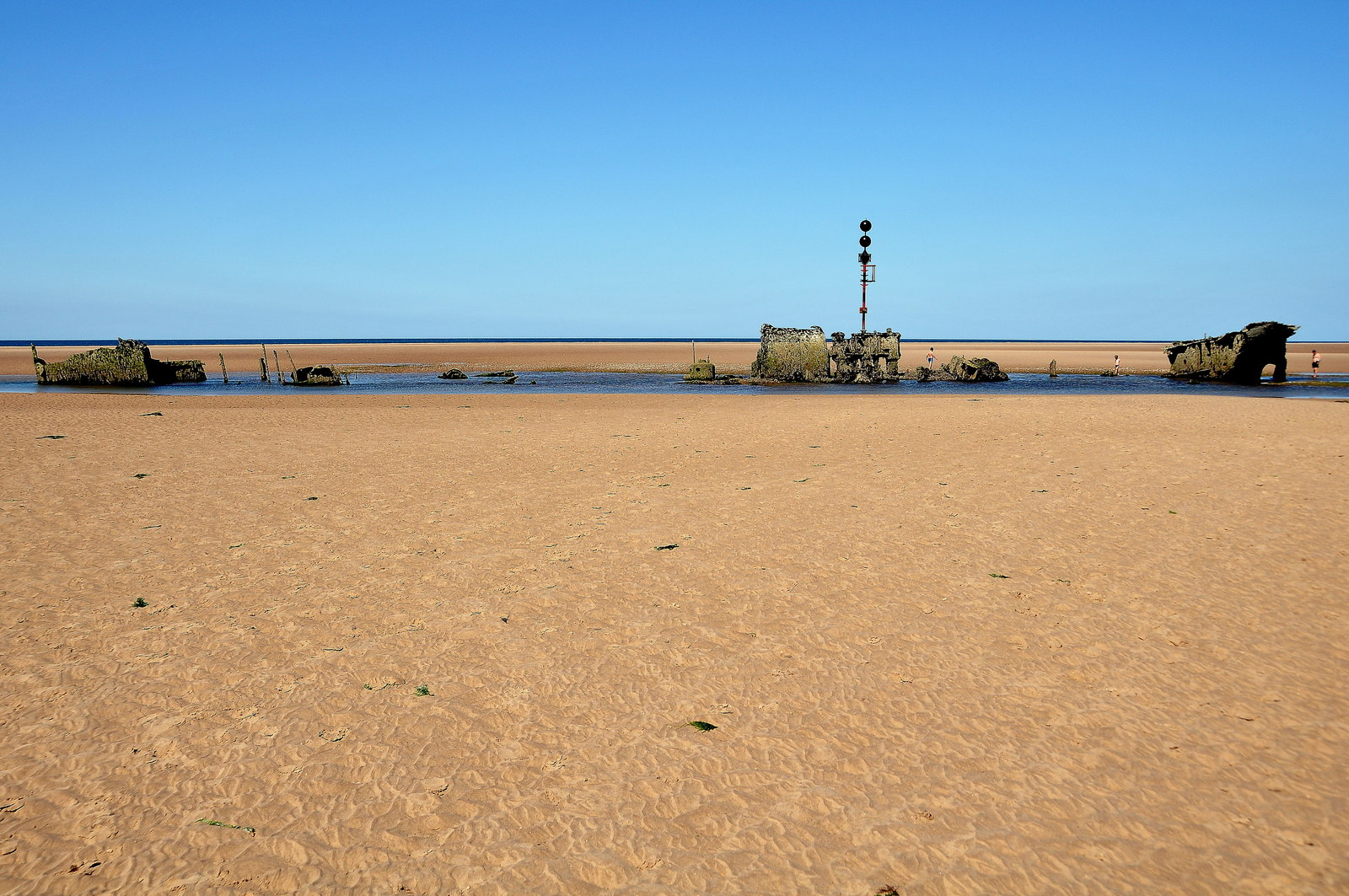
The wreck of the SS Vina, seen in 2010.

Thornham Marsh, immediately west of Titchwell, was used between 1914 and 1918 by the Royal Flying Corps as a bombing range. Some brickwork on Titchwell Marsh is all that remains of a military hospital dating from that period. A First World War concrete building along the west bank was let as holiday accommodation until the British Army returned in 1942.

During the Second World War, military defences were constructed at Titchwell. The drainage of farmland behind the banks was stopped, reflooding the former marshland; zigzag ditches were dug, and pillboxes built into Old Lord's Bank. Between 1942 and 1945, the marsh was used by the Royal Tank Regiment; an armoured fighting vehicle gunnery range was established and new banks were constructed for firing practice, with targets set at 900 m (980 yd) intervals. Some of the still extant islands were built to hold "pop-up" targets, operated by cables from winches in a building whose foundations lie below Island Hide. Remains of the triangular concrete track used by the tanks also survive. Military activities continued after the war, with the Royal Air Force returning to Thornham Marsh between 1950 and 1959. Bombing practice was supervised from a control tower, which was demolished in 1962, leaving only a concrete structure opposite the end of Titchwell's west bank. The remains of two Second World War Covenanter tanks, probably used as targets, are sometimes exposed at low tide.

The wreck of the SS Vina, a cargo steamer built in 1894, can be seen at low tide. In 1944, she was anchored offshore for use as an RAF target when a gale dragged her to her present location and sank her. After the war, some of the wreck was salvaged as scrap. The remains of the Vina are accessible at low tide, but visiting them is potentially hazardous as the wreck is quickly cut off and submerged by the incoming tide. A warning sign on the wreck advises anyone reaching it to return to the beach immediately.

Behind the sea wall, the marshes were drained after the war, and reverted to farmland, but the bank was breached in the North Sea flood of 1953, returning the whole area to tidal saltmarsh dominated by sea aster. The construction of a new sea wall across the reserve created a shallow freshwater lagoon, with a reed bed on its northern side and a vegetation-free brackish marsh.

=== RSPB era ===
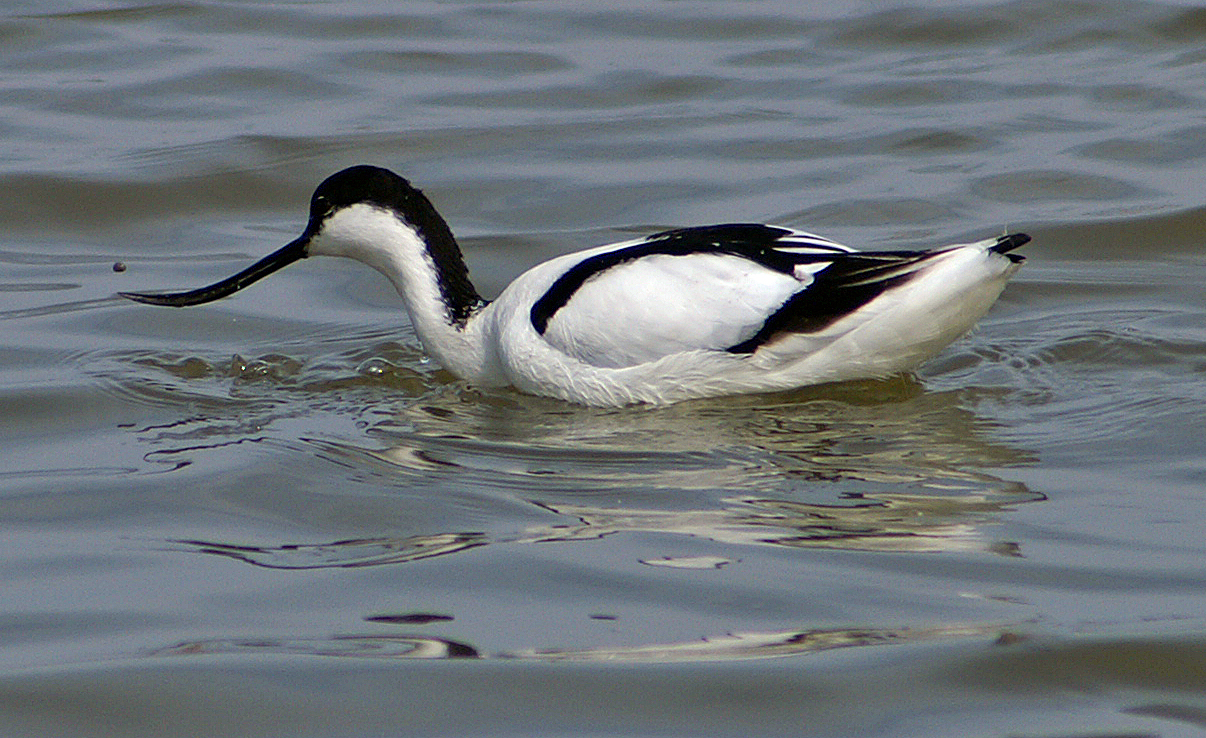
The avocet features on the RSPB's logo.

Between 1970 and 1972, a pair of Montagu's harriers, Britain's rarest breeding birds of prey, nested in the reed bed. The RSPB bought the reserve in 1973 for £53,000 (£576,000 in 2026). The Montagu's harriers did not return, but marsh harriers did, and the RSPB commenced improving the habitat and facilities, including embanking the lagoons and building a car park and visitor centre. Avocets, then still very rare in the UK, first bred here in 1984. The visitor centre facilities were improved between 1987 and 1989 to cope with the numbers of visitors.

In 1991, the sea broke through the dunes at the eastern end of the beach near the former Tern Hide, and the dunes started to erode. The remains of the Second World War tanks first appeared around this time. In the following year the boardwalk at the beach end of the west bank was constructed to protect the dunes, and the seawatching platform was added at its northern end. 12 hectares (30 acres) of land to the east of the reserve was bought in 1993; much of this was formerly part of the firing range, and large amounts of barbed wire caused problems when the area was being converted to reed bed and wet grazing meadow. Over the winter, an old hide on the West Bank was demolished and replaced with the current Island Hide. Storms in February 1996 removed most of the dunes east of the boardwalk, and eroded those to the west. The Tern Hide, now cut off at high tide, was dismantled. Developments at the end of the 20th century included the 1997 extension of the visitor centre, which included building a cafe, and the erection of Fen Hide in 1999, together with a boardwalk path to the hide, and a dragonfly pond.

The reserve covers 171 hectares (420 acres), and is of international importance for its breeding and wintering birds. It was designated as a Site of Special Scientific Interest (SSSI) in 1973, and in 1986 it was subsumed into the 7,700 hectares (19,000 acres) North Norfolk Coast SSSI. The larger area is now additionally protected through Natura 2000, Special Protection Area (SPA) and Ramsar listings, and is part of the Norfolk Coast Area of Outstanding Natural Beauty (AONB). This is the RSPB's most visited reserve, with about 92,000 visitors annually.

== Access and facilities ==
Titchwell Marsh is next to the A149 road and buses stop outside the reserve. The main track to the beach is a public right-of-way, and the only part of the reserve where dogs are permitted. The reserve is open all year, and access is free, although non-members are charged for using the car park. The main part of the reserve is accessed from the visitor centre using the 1 km (1,050 yd) West Bank footpath. After leaving the woodland around the visitor centre, there are two short paths running from the main path; the 200 m (220 yd) Fen Trail to a hide overlooking the reed bed, and the 100 m (110 yd) Meadow Trail boardwalk loop through wet marsh and past the dragonfly pond. The main footpath continues north past the reedbed to the freshwater lagoon and the Island Hide, then reaches a bank running across the reserve. The new Parrinder hides are placed along this wall. The footpath continues past a tidal lagoon, and over another bank to a saltmarsh, formerly ending at a raised wooden seawatching platform on the dunes by the beach.

The visitor centre and shop are open daily except Christmas Day and Boxing Day. Most of the reserve and its facilities are wheelchair accessible, but the last part of the path to the beach is rough, and accessed via a steep bank.

== Fauna and flora ==
=== Birds ===
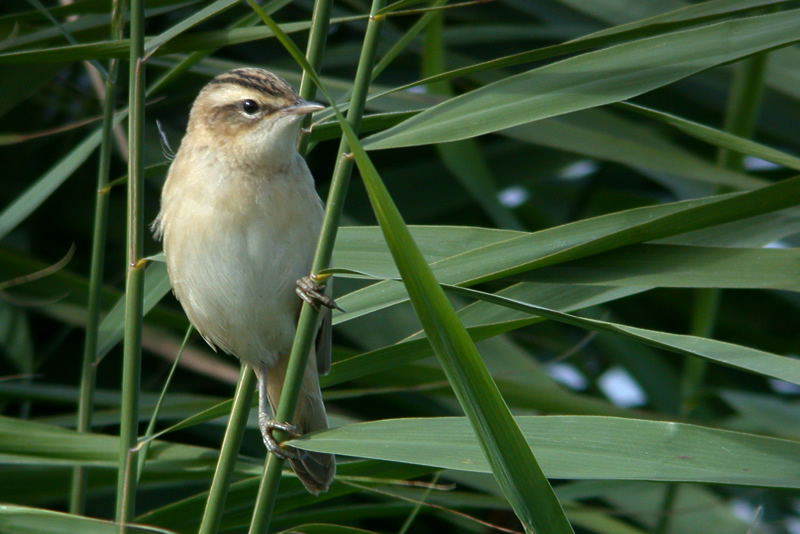
Sedge warblers breed in the marsh.

The key breeding species are reed bed specialists such as the marsh harrier, Eurasian bittern and bearded reedling, together with the avocet, the RSPB's symbolic bird. Bitterns stopped breeding on the reserve in 1989 due to inadequate habitat and a lack of sufficient large food fish; although European eels, a favoured food, are present, the numbers are too low. These problems were addressed by managing water levels and excavating some of the reed bed to create open, reed-fringed pools, and stocking the lagoon with the common rudd; breeding recommenced in 2004. In 2011, there were 80 avocet nests, two pairs of Eurasian bitterns, and four pairs of marsh harriers, the latter successfully fledging seven young.

Other breeding birds include ringed plovers and Eurasian oystercatchers in the sand dunes, and water rails in the reed bed. Sedge, reed and Cetti's warblers all nest in the wetland, and little egrets are now common on the reserve. In early summer, scarcer migrants like the little gull, black tern, Eurasian spoonbills and garganey may pass through on their way to breed elsewhere.

In the autumn, species arrive from the north, some, such as black-tailed godwits, curlew sandpipers and little stints just passing through, pausing for a few days to refuel, others staying for the winter. This is also a good time to see bearded reedlings. Offshore, great and Arctic skuas, northern gannets and black-legged kittiwakes may pass close by in favourable winds.

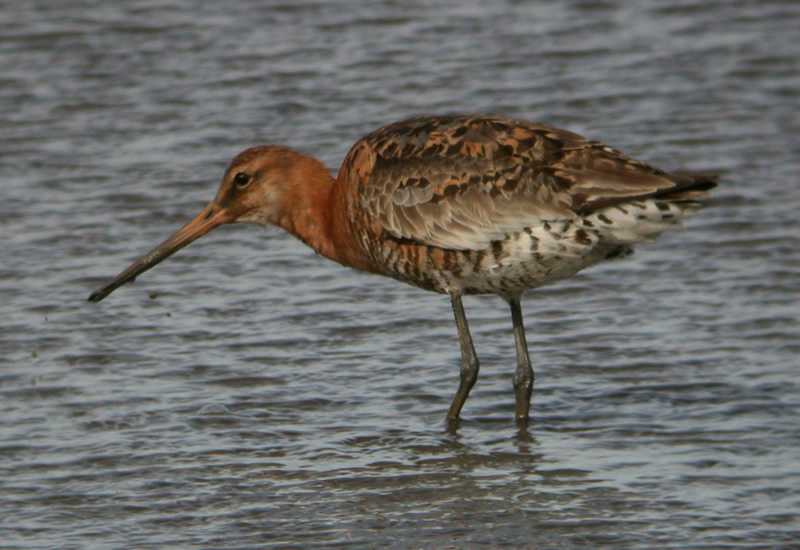
Black-tailed godwits of the Icelandic subspecies pass through on migration.

Large numbers of ducks winter on the reserve, including many Eurasian wigeons, Eurasian teals, mallards and gadwalls, and smaller counts of goldeneyes and northern pintails. Offshore, there may be large "rafts" of common scoters, and smaller numbers of common eiders, long-tailed ducks, velvet scoters and red-throated divers. Brent geese feed on sea lettuce and other green algae, and hundreds of European golden plovers may roost on the reserve at high tide. In the evenings, large flocks of pink-footed geese fly over Titchwell on their way to roost, and barn owls and hen harriers quarter the marshes. This is the season for flocks of lesser redpolls, sometimes accompanied by a rarer common redpoll, and snow buntings are to be found on the beach.

The reserve's location means that migrants may be found, sometimes in huge numbers when the weather conditions are right, sometimes including vagrant rarities. Major rarities in recent years include a Pacific golden plover and a great knot in 2016, and a slender-billed gull and a penduline tit in 2014.

=== Other animals and plants ===
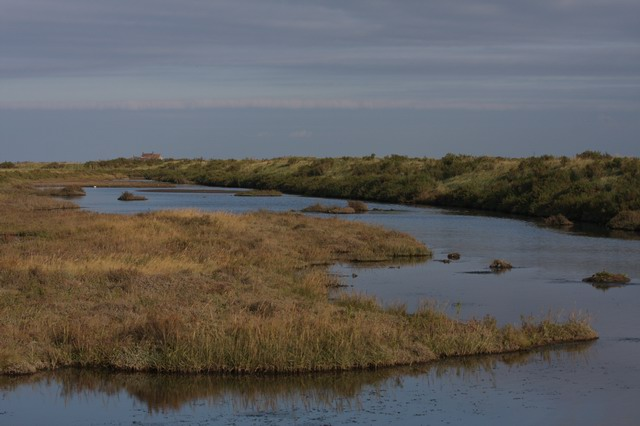
Saltmarsh behind the beach

Water voles are an endangered species in the UK, with a huge decline in numbers, mainly due to predation by the introduced American mink. They are still common at Titchwell, which is one of a number of East Anglian sites now of national importance for this species. Both common and grey seals can be seen off the beach. Other vertebrates include European eels, common toads and three-spined sticklebacks.

In summer, the dragonfly pond can hold up to ten species of dragonflies and damselflies. The nationally scarce moth flame wainscot has bred at Titchwell since 1996; other Lepidoptera may include migrants such as the painted lady, the diamondback moth, and especially the silver Y, which can occur in huge numbers; 90,000 were recorded on the reserve in July 2010, feeding on sea lavender.

The saltmarsh contains glassworts and common cord grass in the most exposed regions, with a succession of plants following on as the marsh becomes more established: first sea aster, then mainly sea lavender, with sea purslane in the creeks and smaller areas of sea plantain and other common marsh plants. The drier areas contain maritime grasses such as sea couch grass and sea poa grass. The reedbeds are dominated by common reed with saltmarsh rush, brackish water crowfoot, sea clubrush and common bulrush also common in the various wetland habitats.

== Recreation ==
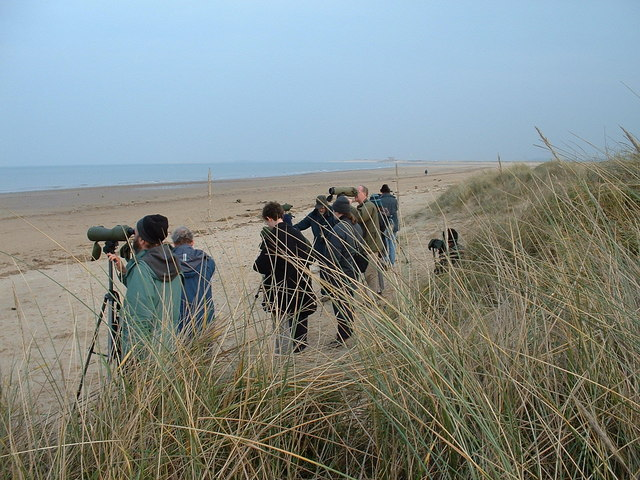
Birdwatching visitors help to support the local economy.

As the RSPB's busiest reserve, Titchwell Marsh has a significant economic impact on its locality. A 2002 survey reported that an estimated 137,700 visitors spent £1.8 million locally in 1998. The tiny village of Titchwell has two three-star hotels and a shop selling telescopes and binoculars, although it does not have a general store or a public house.

A 2005 survey at Titchwell and five other North Norfolk coastal sites found that 39 per cent of visitors gave birdwatching as the main purpose of their visit. The 7.7 million day visitors and 5.5 million who made overnight stays in the area in 1999 are estimated to have spent £122 million, and created the equivalent of 2,325 full-time jobs.

== Threats ==
The soft rocks of the North Norfolk coast have been attacked by the sea for centuries; at Titchwell Marsh, the beach and sand dunes protecting the northern edge of the reserve have been eroded, and climate change has increased the likelihood of damage to the freshwater areas of the reserve. The predicted increasingly stormy weather could damage the dune system and expose the soft earth banks to wave damage, or the sea could just over-top the defences, as it did in the 1953 floods. Either way, the conservation value of the reserve would be adversely affected, especially through the potential loss of the bitterns. Rather than reinforce the outer bank, it was decided to undertake a managed realignment. Between 2010 and 2011, the banks on the east and west of the reserve were reinforced, and the sea wall to the north of the fresh marsh was rebuilt on the line of the old Parrinder bank. The old Parrinder Hide was replaced by a pair of modern hides, retaining the original name. Designed by HaysomWardMiller, these hides won an award from RIBA for their architectural style. The former brackish marsh north of the new wall has been modified by creating a breach in the east bank. This will allow tidal flooding and the eventual establishment of saltmarsh on what is now named Volunteer Marsh. The new saltmarsh will protect the rebuilt Parrinder wall, slowing erosion. Nevertheless, it is estimated that by 2060 the beach may have advanced halfway across the new tidal area. Other improvements were made to the reed beds and islands in the freshwater lagoon, and a new sluice was installed. New reedbeds were created east of Fen Hide, which can be accessed by trails opened in 2012. The first part of the trail is open all year, but the "autumn trail", running up from the woodland in the southeastern corner of the reserve, is accessible only from August to October.

== Cited texts ==
- Elkins, Norman (1988). Weather and Bird Behaviour. Waterhouses, Staffordshire: Poyser. ISBN 0-85661-051-8.
- Hammomd, Nicholas, ed. (1984). RSPB Nature Reserves. Sandy, Beds: RSPB. ISBN 0-903138-12-3.
- Harrup, Simon; Redman, Nigel (2010). Where to watch birds in Britain. London: Christopher Helm. ISBN 978-1-4081-1059-1.
- Liley, D (2008). Development and the north Norfolk coast. Scoping document on the issues relating to access (PDF). Wareham, Dorset: Footprint Ecology. Archived from the original (PDF) on 31 August 2012.
- Murphy, Peter (2009). The English Coast: a history and a prospect. London: Continuum International Publishing. ISBN 978-1-84725-143-5.
- Newton, Ian (2010). Bird Migration: Collins New Naturalist Library (113). London: Collins. ISBN 978-0-00-730732-6.
- Robertson, David; Crawley, Peter; Barker, Adam; Whitmore, Sandrine (2005). Norfolk Archaeological Unit Report No. 1045: Norfolk Rapid Coastal Zone Archaeological Survey (PDF). Norwich: Norfolk Archaeological Unit.
- Robinson, Bruce (1986). The Peddars Way and Norfolk Coast Path: Issue 13 of Long distance route guide. London: Her Majesty's Stationery Office. ISBN 0-11-701191-6.
- Shiel, Anna; Rayment, Matthew; Burton, Graham (2002). RSPB Reserves and Local Economies (PDF). Sandy, Beds: RSPB.
- Taylor, Marianne; Holden, Peter (2009). RSPB where to discover nature in Britain and Northern Ireland. London: Christopher Helm. ISBN 978-1-4081-0864-2.
