= String Quartet No. 1 =

String Quartet No. 1 may refer to:

- String Quartet No. 1 (Barber) by Samuel Barber
- String Quartet No. 1 (Bartók) by Béla Bartók
- String Quartet No. 1 (Beethoven) by Ludwig van Beethoven
- String Quartet No. 1 (Bois) by Rob du Bois
- String Quartet No. 1 (Borodin) by Alexander Borodin
- String Quartet No. 1 (Brahms) by Johannes Brahms
- String Quartet No. 1 (Bridge) by Frank Bridge
- String Quartet No. 1 (Britten) by Benjamin Britten
- String Quartet No. 1 (Carter) by Elliott Carter
- String Quartet No. 1 (Debussy) by Claude Debussy
- String Quartet No. 1 (Diamond) by David Diamond
- String Quartet No. 1 (Dvořák) by Antonín Dvořák
- String Quartet No. 1 (Enescu) by George Enescu
- String Quartet No. 1 (Ferneyhough) by Brian Ferneyhough
- String Quartet No. 1 (Grieg) by Edvard Grieg
- String Quartet No. 1 (Haas) by Pavel Haas
- String Quartet No. 1 (Halffter) by Cristóbal Halffter
- String Quartet No. 1 (Hill) by Alfred Hill
- String Quartet No. 1 (Ives) by Charles Ives
- String Quartet No. 1 (Janáček), Kreutzer Sonata by Leoš Janáček
- String Quartet No. 1 (Kirchner) by Leon Kirchner
- String Quartet No. 1 (Ligeti), Métamorphoses nocturnes by György Ligeti
- String Quartet No. 1 (McCabe) by John McCabe
- String Quartet No. 1 (Maconchy) by Elizabeth Maconchy
- String Quartet No. 1 (Marco), Aura by Tomás Marco
- String Quartet No. 1 (Martinů), French Quartet by Bohuslav Martinů
- String Quartet No. 1 (Mendelssohn) by Felix Mendelssohn
- String Quartet No. 1 (Milhaud), Op. 5, by Darius Milhaud
- String Quartet No. 1 (Mozart) by Wolfgang Amadeus Mozart
- String Quartet No. 1 (Nielsen) by Carl Nielsen
- String Quartet No. 1 (Persichetti), Op. 7, by Vincent Persichetti
- String Quartet No. 1 (Piston) by Walter Piston
- String Quartet No. 1 (Porter) by Quincy Porter
- String Quartet No. 1 (Prokofiev) by Sergei Prokofiev
- String Quartet No. 1 (Ravel) by Maurice Ravel
- String Quartet No. 1 (Revueltas) by Silvestre Revueltas
- String Quartet No. 1 (Rihm) by Wolfgang Rihm
- String Quartet No. 1 (Rouse) by Christopher Rouse
- String Quartet No. 1 (Schoenberg) by Arnold Schoenberg
- String Quartet No. 1 (Schubert) by Franz Schubert
- String Quartet No. 1 (Schumann) by Robert Schumann
- String Quartet No. 1 (Shostakovich) by Dmitri Shostakovich
- String Quartet No. 1 (Smetana), From My Life by Bedřich Smetana
- String Quartet No. 1 (Szymanowski) by Karol Szymanowski
- String Quartet No. 1 (Tchaikovsky) by Pyotr Ilyich Tchaikovsky
- String Quartet No. 1 (Tippett) by Michael Tippett
- String Quartet no. 1 (Van Wyk) by Arnold van Wyk
- String Quartet No. 1 (Villa-Lobos) by Heitor Villa-Lobos
