= Number One Fan =

Number One Fan may refer to:

- Number One Fan (band), a rock band based in Appleton, Wisconsin
- Number One Fan (film), a 2014 French comedy-drama film
- Number One Fan (TV series), a 2026 British TV series
- "Number One Fan", song by Muna from the album Saves the World
- "#1 Fan", song by LL Cool J from the album Todd Smith

== See also ==
- Fan (person)
- Superfan (disambiguation)
