= Lookout (disambiguation) =

A lookout or look-out is a person on a ship in charge of the observation of the sea for hazards, other ships, land, etc..

Lookout may also refer to:

== Observers and observation ==
- Fire lookout, a person assigned the duty to look for fire from a high place, which might also be termed a lookout. See also:
  - Fire lookout tower
  - Lookout tree
- Scenic viewpoint, an observation spot also known as a lookout

== Places ==
=== Geographic features ===
- Lookout Summit, a mountain in Washington, U.S.
- The Lookout (Springfield Township), a summit in Pennsylvania, U.S.
- Cape Lookout (disambiguation)
- Lookout Mountain (disambiguation)
- Point Lookout (disambiguation)

=== United States municipalities ===
- Lookout, California
- Lookout, Indiana
- Lookout, Kentucky
- Lookout, Pennsylvania
- Lookout, West Virginia
- Lookout, Wisconsin
- Fort Lookout (Kansas)
- Fort Lookout (Arkansas)

== Arts, entertainment, and media ==
=== Films ===
- The Lookout (1990 film), 1990 Israeli comedy film
- The Lookout (2007 film), 2007 American crime film
- The Lookout (2012 film), 2012 French crime film, directed by Michele Placido and starring Daniel Auteuil

=== Music ===
- The Lookout (album), a 2018 album by Laura Veirs
- "Lookout", 2017 song by Ryan Adams from the album Prisoner: End of the World Edition
- Lookout!#99, an unreleased album by Downfall

=== Other arts, entertainment, and media ===
- Lookout! Records, American punk rock record label which existed 1987-2012
- The Lookout, the Lansing Community College student newspaper

== Ships ==
- Lookout (clipper), 1853 clipper ship in the San Francisco and West Coast lumber trades
- HMS Lookout, two British Royal Navy ships
- USS Lookout, U.S. Navy radar picket ship

== Sports ==
- Lookout (horse), an American Thoroughbred racehorse
- Chattanooga Lookouts, a minor league baseball team

== Other uses ==
- Lookout (architecture), a structural element used in roof framing
- Lookout Air Raids, the minor but unique bombing air raid against US mainland during World War II

== See also ==
- Look Out (disambiguation)
- Lookouts (disambiguation)
