= Lookouts (disambiguation) =

Lookouts is the plural of lookout, and may also refer to:

- The Chattanooga Lookouts, a baseball team
- The Lookouts, a punk band

== See also ==
- Lookout (disambiguation)
