= Number 1s =

Number 1s, #1s or Number Ones may refer to:

- A type of greatest hits album in which all or most of the songs were number-one chart hits. Among them are:
  - Number Ones (ABBA album), 2006
  - Number Ones (Bee Gees album), 2004
  - #1's (Destiny's Child album), 2005
  - Number Ones (Janet Jackson album), 2009
  - #1's (Mariah Carey album), 1998
  - Number Ones (Michael Jackson album), 2003
    - Number Ones (video), the related DVD by Michael Jackson
  - Reba #1's, an album by Reba McEntire
- Number 1's (Prince Royce album)
- #1s... and Then Some, an album by Brooks & Dunn
- Number Ones (TV series), a Canadian music-video program
- The Number Ones, an album by the Beatles

== See also ==
- Category:Compilation albums of number-one songs
- Category:Number-one singles
- Number One (disambiguation)
- One (disambiguation)
- Ones (disambiguation)
