= World number 1 =

World number 1 or world no. 1 refers to the highest world ranking in several competitive sports:

- List of FIDE chess world number ones, in chess
- List of PSA women's number 1 ranked players, women's squash
- List of world number one male golfers, in men's golf
- List of World Number One female golfers, in women's golf
- List of world number one snooker players, in snooker
- World number 1 ranked tennis players, in tennis
