= My Number One (disambiguation) =

"My Number One" is a song by Helena Paparizou that won the Eurovision Song Contest.

My Number One may also refer to:

- My Number One (album), an alternative title for Protereotita, an album by Helena Paparizou containing the song "My Number One"
- "My Number One" (Luv' song), 1980

== See also ==
- "He's My Number One", a 1980 song by Christie Allen
- "My Number One Doctor", an episode of the TV series Scrubs
- "You're My Number One", a 1999 song by S Club 7
- Number One (disambiguation)
