= List of seawatching locations by country =

The following is a list of notable seawatching locations, by country:

== Australia ==
=== New South Wales ===
- Magic Point

=== Queensland ===
- Point Lookout

=== Victoria ===
- Cape Schanck
- Point Addis
- Point Lonsdale

=== Western Australia ===
- North Mole, Fremantle
- Point Peron, Rockingham
- Woodman Point, Cockburn
- Hillarys Boat Harbour, Hillarys
- West end of Rottnest Island, Rottnest Island
- Halls Head, Mandurah
- Cape Naturaliste (near Dunsborough)
- Cape Leeuwin (near Augusta)
- Bunker Bay, Dunsborough
- Red Bluff, Kalbarri
- Red Bluff, Carnarvon

== Britain ==
=== Cornwall ===
- Gwennap Head, Porthgwarra
- Pendeen Watch
- St Ives Island

=== Devon ===
- Prawle Point

=== Dorset ===
- Portland Bill

=== County Durham ===
- Hartlepool Headland

=== Kent ===
- Dungeness

=== Merseyside ===
- Hilbre Island

=== Sussex ===
- Selsey Bill

=== Tyne and Wear ===
- Whitburn

=== Yorkshire ===
- Flamborough Head

== Wales ==
- Strumble Head
- Bardsey Island

== Ireland ==
- Bridges of Ross, County Clare
- Loop Head, County Clare
- Kilcummin, County Mayo
- Downpatrick Head, County Mayo
- Mulloughmore Head, County Sligo
- St. Johns Point, County Donegal
- Galley Head, County Cork
- Cape Clear Island, County Cork
- Mizen Head, County Cork
- Dunowen, County Cork
- Brandon Head, County Kerry
- Helvic Head, County Waterford
- St. John's Point, County Down
- Clogher Head, County Louth
- Ramore Head, County Antrim

== The Netherlands ==
- Den Helder
- IJmuiden
- Katwijk
- Lauwersoog
- West Frisian Islands
- Westkapelle

== New Zealand ==
- Kaikōura

== Portugal ==
- Madeira

== United States ==
=== California ===
- Cordell Bank
- Gulf of the Farallones
- Monterey Bay

=== New Jersey ===
- Avalon

=== North Carolina ===
- Cape Hatteras

=== Texas ===
- Hans and Pat Suter Wildlife Refuge, Corpus Christi, Texas
