= Point Lookout Foreshore =

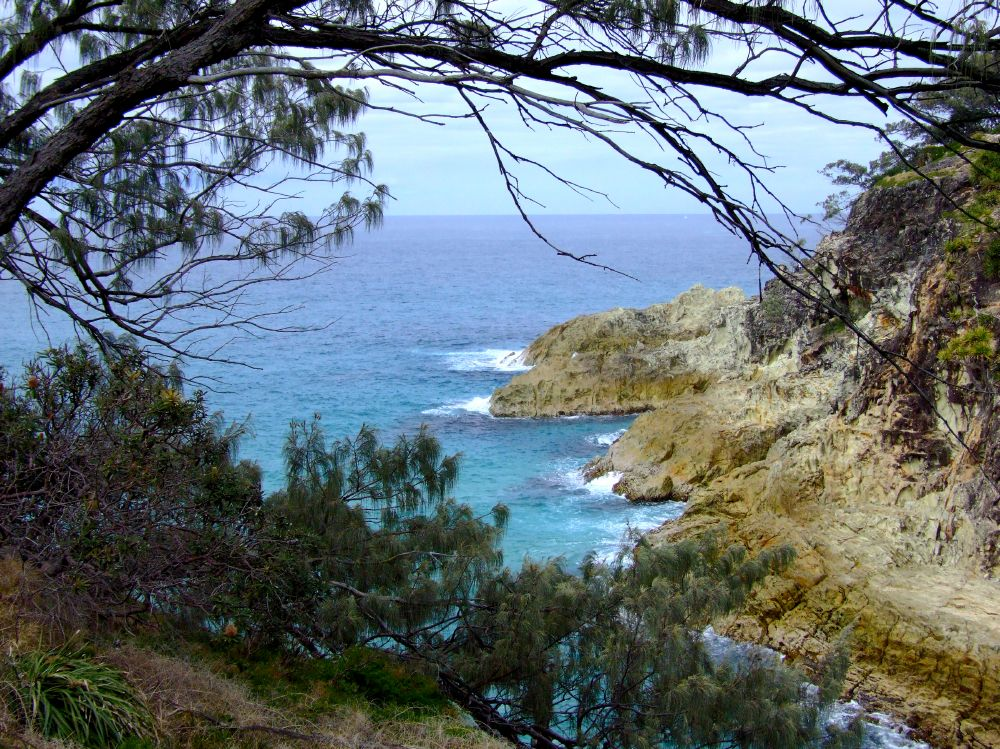
- View of the gorge, Point Lookout Foreshore, 2008

- Location within Queensland Location within Australia
- 27.4306°S 153.5376°E
- Location: East Coast Road, Point Lookout, City of Redland, Queensland, Australia

Queensland Heritage Register
- Official name: Point Lookout Foreshore, Mooloomba
- Type: state heritage (landscape)
- Designated: 27 August 2004
- Reference no.: 602261
- Significant period: 1770, 1803, 1902, 1932 (historical)

Point Lookout Foreshore is a heritage-listed headland at East Coast Road, Point Lookout, City of Redland, Queensland, Australia. It is also known as Mooloomba. It was added to the Queensland Heritage Register on 27 August 2004.

== History ==
Captain James Cook named the rocky headland on the north-eastern tip Stradbroke Island Point Lookout in 1770, as a warning to shipping. Although the area had been used and occupied for tens of thousands of years by Indigenous people, the first recorded European presence at Point Lookout was in 1803 when Matthew Flinders, returning to Sydney from an ill-fated exploration trip further north, sent men ashore at an area that is now known as Cylinder Beach to collect water from a spring.

Point Lookout remained isolated and, although close to Brisbane, was rarely visited. The first European settlements on Stradbroke Island were on more accessible parts of the island, where there was safe anchorage. A pilot station was set up at Amity Point in 1825, and a depot for stores for the penal settlement at Moreton Bay was established at Dunwich in 1827, though this was abandoned shortly afterward.

Warner carried out a survey of the coast from Point Lookout to New South Wales in 1846. This was only a beach transverse, but a survey of the Moreton Bay area by Dixon included an area at Point Lookout as one of a number of government reserves located in various parts of the bay earmarked for possible future use. However, development continued to be in the more accessible parts of Stradbroke Island and in 1850 a quarantine station was set up at Dunwich to be succeeded by the large government Dunwich Benevolent Asylum in 1864.

In 1895 Bill North was granted an occupational licence for one year to run cattle around Point Lookout, and he built a hut at the Point and a cattle dip behind Adder Rock. He continued to use the land for a number of years, supplying the asylum at Dunwich with meat.

In 1902 North cared for five surviving crew members of the brigantine Prosperity, which was wrecked at night half a mile south east of Point Lockout. Two of the crew died and were buried behind the dunes on what has continued to be named Deadman's Beach.

Because the government used Stradbroke Island, like other Moreton Bay islands, for institutional purposes, the population of Brisbane did not consider these places as holiday destinations, despite their proximity and natural attributes. Amity Point developed as a small holiday resort, but it was quite separate from Dunwich. The only connection between the two places was by walking along the beach at low tide or along the route of the telegraph line.

The first settlement of Point Lookout occurred in 1932 when a substantial concrete lighthouse was built. A lighthouse and signal station was proposed in 1825 but did not eventuate and in 1848 the pilot station was moved from Amity Point to Cape Moreton because the South Passage was considered too dangerous. A hut was built to store acetylene cylinders at Cylinder Beach, which derived its name from this usage. Shortly after the construction of the lighthouse Bertie Clayton established a guesthouse above Main Beach. Guests arrived at Amity Point by launch and were collected by him by car and taken back to the guesthouse either along the beach, or at high tide, along a track beside the swamp adjacent to the beach. Clayton's guests were accommodated in tents with timber floors that later evolved into tent-like huts with concrete walls and fibrous cement roofs.

Land was surveyed and offered for sale by the Department of Lands. Most of the blocks sold were situated between the guesthouse and the lighthouse reserve with another small area on the hill behind Cylinder Beach. The land offered for sale was well away from the foreshores and wilderness areas, which were protected from development and made into a Reserve for Camping and Recreation.

In 1935 Hayles Cruises started a regular launch service from Brisbane to Amity Point. This allowed campers and others to visit the Point and encouraged some permanent and weekend settlement. Growth was modest and was halted by World War II when the area was occupied by American and Australian forces and placed out of bounds to civilians.

After the war, which had little long-term impact on the area, the Point returned to being a holiday place. It was still difficult to access, requiring a three-hour launch trip from Brisbane and a bus trip over Clayton's rough track from Amity. Building at Point Lookout was difficult as all materials had to be transported from Brisbane by the same route. Some small permanent houses or huts were built mainly for holiday accommodation. A census taken in 1948 showed that the population consisted of 40 permanent residents, 20 holidaymakers in houses and 30 guests at the Samarinda Guest house, the name given by new owners to Clayton's Guest House. A new Clayton's Guest House was constructed behind Cylinder Beach.

The Benevolent Institution at Dunwich closed in 1947 and the area opened for settlement. In 1955 Stradbroke Island was made part of the Redland Shire and shortly thereafter a rough road was constructed linking Dunwich, Amity Point and Point Lookout. In 1957 a barge service was commenced from Redland Bay to Dunwich that allowed regular vehicular access to the island.

Point Lookout experienced an increase in growth and easier access brought it to the attention of the popular press, with numerous articles appearing in newspapers. Increased interest and demand for holiday housing led to the release of more sites for sale by the Department of Lands in the 1970s and 1980s. Growth since has been steady, but development has been small scale and mainly domestic. The Reserve has remained largely intact, although some land was resumed for subdivision in the 1970s and some development is now visible from the beaches.

Point Lookout headland has become a whale watching lookout and a point for observation of passing sea birds. It is a popular place to observe fish, turtles, porpoises, sharks and other marine life. A special vantage point is the headland overlooking Frenchman's Beach that affords good views of the water below.

== Description ==
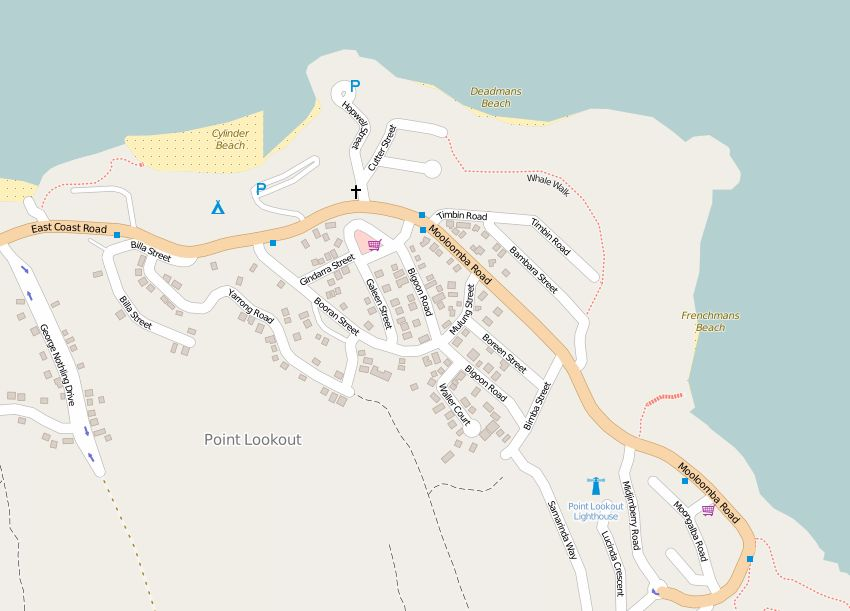
Open Street Map of Point Lookout, showing the three beaches, 2015

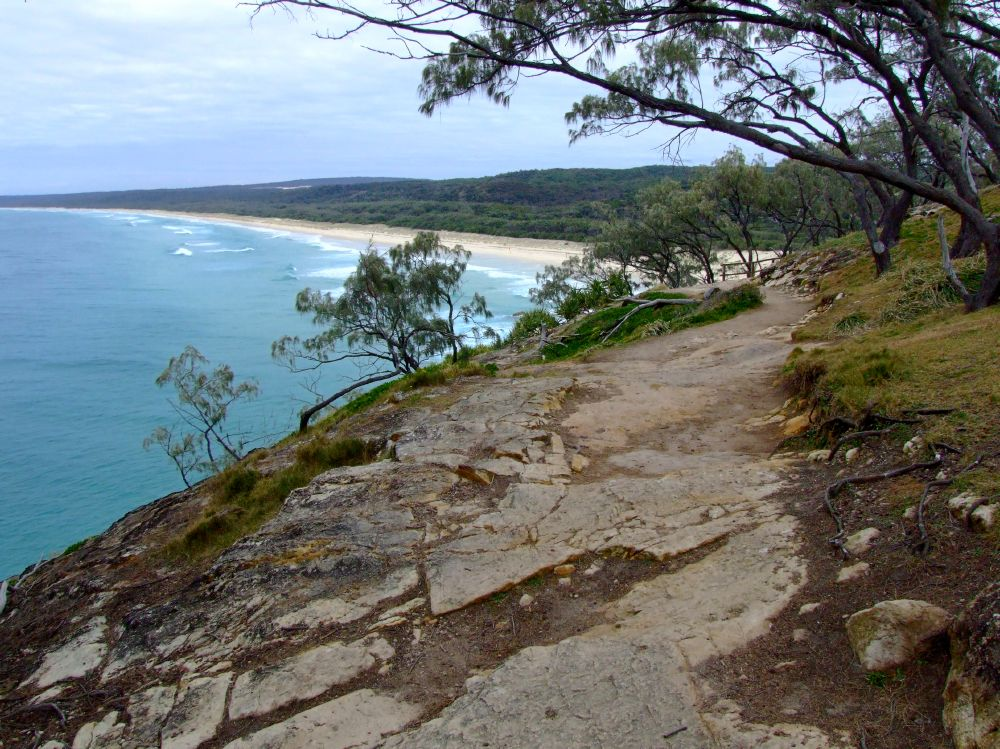
View from the foreshore along the coast, 2008

This area comprises the whole of the Scenic, Recreational and Camping Reserve at Point Lookout, reserves for Life Savers at Cylinder Beach and Main Beach, the Reserve for Camping near Kennedy Drive.

Point Lookout reserve is a large area of natural bush between the main East Coast Road and the ocean and consists of the rocky headland known as the Point and three small beaches enclosed by rocky headlands and steep vegetated hillsides. All three beaches, Frenchman's, Deadman's and Cylinder Beach, have outstanding scenic coastal landscapes, both as seen from vantage points above and from within the beach landscape.

Frenchman's Beach is particularly notable for its scenic value, its scale and intactness and minimal development visible from the beach. A timber staircase leads from the main road to the beach and provides vistas of the beach and the coastal vegetation behind it. This vegetation is extensive and reaches up the high dunes to the road. At the bottom of the high dunes there is a large area of smaller sparsely vegetated dunes that contain depositions of volcanic ash.

Cylinder Beach lies crescent shaped between rocky headlands, backed by natural vegetation behind the beach and on the headlands. Some of the vegetation behind the beach itself has been removed in past years to provide car parking and camping facilities, although sufficient remains to screen the development on the hills behind the beach. The vegetation on the southernmost headland, Cylinder Headland, is particularly dense and screens a church and other development along Hopewell Street.

Cylinder Beach faces north and is the most popular swimming beach at Point Lookout. The beach often has a lagoon, which is a popular place for children to swim. Cylinder Headland is used as a vantage point to watch the surfers and the swimmers on the beach and to view Shag Rocks and Moreton Island, which can be seen in the distance. Deadman's Beach lis between Frenchman's and Cylinder Beaches and is also contained by rocky headlands. Some housing development can be seen from the beach above the rocky cliffs and trees at the northern edge of the beach. The remainder of the beach has a dense backdrop of natural vegetation. The southern end of the beach consists of a series of rocky outcrops that contain numerous rock pools. The area behind this part of the beach consists of high dunes and a rocky cliff. The cliff known as Camel Rock is composed of rhyolitic volcanic rock that is heavily fractured and contorted. Where the cliffs join Frenchman's Beach they have eroded in part to form a cave of reasonable size. The high dunes are mostly vegetated, but in one area a large dune is denuded and consists of a large sand drift that is a popular play area for children.

South of these beaches is a large headland which is the main topographic feature of Point Lookout. It is composed of high rhyolitic cliffs that jut into the ocean. They form a landscape of steep sided narrow gorges, with rock shelves and rocky inlets. The two main inlets are North and South Gorge.

The headland presents vistas from a walking track that follows the top of the cliffs from the site of the old camping and recreation area above South Gorge. The immediate view is of the Gorge and its swimming beach, and of Main Beach and Eighteen Mile Swamp to the south. Further to the east, the track provides panoramic views of the ocean and of Whale Rock with its blowhole. The track winds around North Gorge where there are views of waves breaking on rocks and of the narrow sand inlet at the base of the Gorge. The path then climbs to the headland overlooking Frenchman's Beach and back to the main East Coast Road. The whole walk is about one kilometre long.

The indigenous Casuarina and Pandanus trees dominate the headland vegetation and Banksia and brush box the hillsides and more protected parts of the Reserve headland area. While much of the original understorey species have been replaced over time with intrusive garden plants, on the Point Lookout headland most of the grass cover and some of the native shrubs remain.

== Heritage listing ==
Point Lookout Foreshore was listed on the Queensland Heritage Register on 27 August 2004 having satisfied the following criteria.

The place is important in demonstrating the evolution or pattern of Queensland's history.

The Point Lookout foreshore is significant for the rarity and importance of the cliffs to the understanding and appreciation of geology in Queensland.

The foreshore is important for its outstanding natural beauty, offering a wide variety of land and seascape elements and views. The foreshore with its outlooks to the north and south consists of a series of beaches, rocky headlands, gorges and rocks, areas of diverse vegetation and rugged water edges of rock ledges, blowholes, tunnels and reefs. It is an area of great diversity and aesthetic complexity and offers panoramic views of the ocean.

The Point Lookout foreshore is valued by the indigenous community of North Stradbroke Island for social, cultural and spiritual reasons and has social significance as a holiday place of long standing both with inhabitants of Stradbroke Island and with those who have been regular visitors.

The place demonstrates rare, uncommon or endangered aspects of Queensland's cultural heritage.

The Point Lookout foreshore is significant for the rarity and importance of the cliffs and sea caves in the Triassic rhyolites at Point Lookout to the understanding and appreciation of geology in Queensland.

The place is important because of its aesthetic significance.

The foreshore is important for its outstanding natural beauty, offering a wide variety of land and seascape elements and views. The foreshore with its outlooks to the north and south consists of a series of beaches, rocky headlands, gorges and rocks, areas of diverse vegetation and rugged water edges of rock ledges, blowholes, tunnels and reefs. It is an area of great diversity and aesthetic complexity and offers panoramic views of the ocean.

The place has a strong or special association with a particular community or cultural group for social, cultural or spiritual reasons.

The Point Lookout foreshore is valued by the indigenous community of North Stradbroke Island for social, cultural and spiritual reasons and has social significance as a holiday place of long standing both with inhabitants of Stradbroke Island and with those who have been regular visitors.
