= Ones =

Ones may refer to:

- Ones (album), by Selena, 2002
- The Ones, New York electronica group
- "The Ones" (30 Rock), an episode of 30 Rock
- Baris Önes (born 1985), German politician
- In music, single bars of alternating solos (as in "trading ones"); see Rhythm section#Musical roles

== See also ==
- One (disambiguation)
- Number 1's (disambiguation)
- Onesie (disambiguation)
