= Cape Lookout =

Cape Lookout can refer to:

- Cape Lookout (North Carolina), in the United States
- Cape Lookout (Oregon), in the United States
- Cape Lookout (South Shetland Islands)
