= Fire Station No. 1 (Muncie, Indiana) =

- U.S. National Register of Historic Places
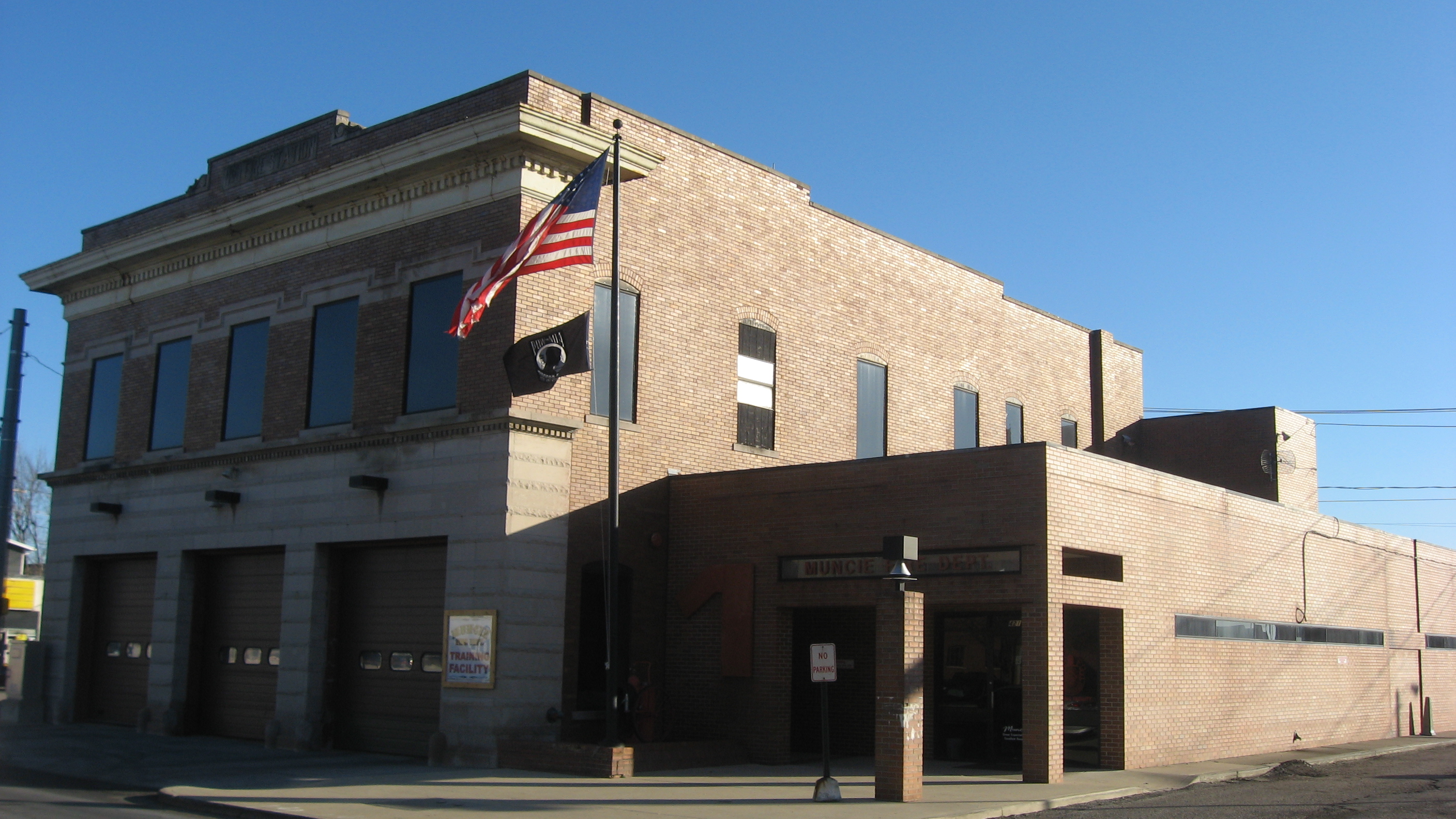
- Fire Station No. 1, January 2012

- Location within Indiana Location within the United States
- Location: 421 E. Jackson St., Muncie, Indiana
- Coordinates: 40°11′33″N 85°22′54″W
- Area: less than one acre
- Built: 1913
- Built by: Colvin, Leslie
- Architect: Kibele, Cuno
- Architectural style: Classical Revival, Neo-Classical
- MPS: Downtown Muncie MRA
- NRHP reference No.: 88002126
- Added to NRHP: February 17, 1989

Fire Station No. 1 is a historic fire station located at Muncie, Indiana. It was built in 1913, and is a two-story, flat roofed building with restrained Classical Revival style detailing. It is faced with buff brick, has alternating rusticated and dressed limestone banding, and a brick parapet. The first floor has three garage bays.

It was added to the National Register of Historic Places in 1989.

On 1 October 2017, it was announced that approximately $100,000 would be invested in floor repairs to enable a firetruck to return to service from the location.
