= Violin Concerto No. 1 =

Violin Concerto No. 1 may refer to any composer's first violin concerto, or to a composer's only violin concerto:

- Violin Concerto in A minor (Bach)
- Violin Concerto (Barber)
- Violin Concerto No. 1 (Bartók)
- Violin Concerto (Beethoven) in D major
- Violin Concerto (Berg)
- Violin Concerto (Brahms) in D major
- Violin Concerto No. 1 (Bruch) in G minor
- Violin Concerto No. 1 (Davies)
- Violin Concerto (Dvořák) in A minor
- Violin Concerto (Elgar) in B minor
- Violin Concerto No. 1 (Glass)
- Violin Concerto No. 1 (Goldmark) in A minor
- Violin Concerto No. 1 (Haydn) in C major
- Violin Concerto No. 1 (Lindberg)
- Violin Concerto (Mendelssohn) in E minor
- Violin Concerto No. 1 (Mozart) in B♭ major
- Violin Concerto No. 1 (Paganini) in D major
- Violin Concerto No. 1 (Piston)
- Violin Concerto No. 1 (Prokofiev) in D major
- Violin Concerto No. 1 (Saint-Saëns) in A major by Camille Saint-Saëns
- Violin Concerto (Schoenberg)
- Violin Concerto (Schumann) in D minor
- Violin Concerto No. 1 (Shostakovich) in A minor
- Violin Concerto (Sibelius) in D minor
- Violin Concerto No. 1 (Szymanowski) (atonal)
- Violin Concerto (Tchaikovsky) in D major
- Violin Concerto No. 1 (Vieuxtemps) in E major by Henri Vieuxtemps
- Violin Concerto No. 1 (Wieniawski) in F♯ minor

== See also ==
- Violin concerto
- List of compositions for violin and orchestra
