= Township 1 =

Township No. 1 or Township 1 may refer to:

- Tyringham, Massachusetts
- Monterey, Massachusetts
- Raleigh Township, Wake County, North Carolina
- Township 1, Benton County, Arkansas
- Township 1, Harper County, Kansas
- Township 1, Rooks County, Kansas
- Township 1, Washington County, Nebraska
