= Superfan =

Superfan or Super Fan may refer to:

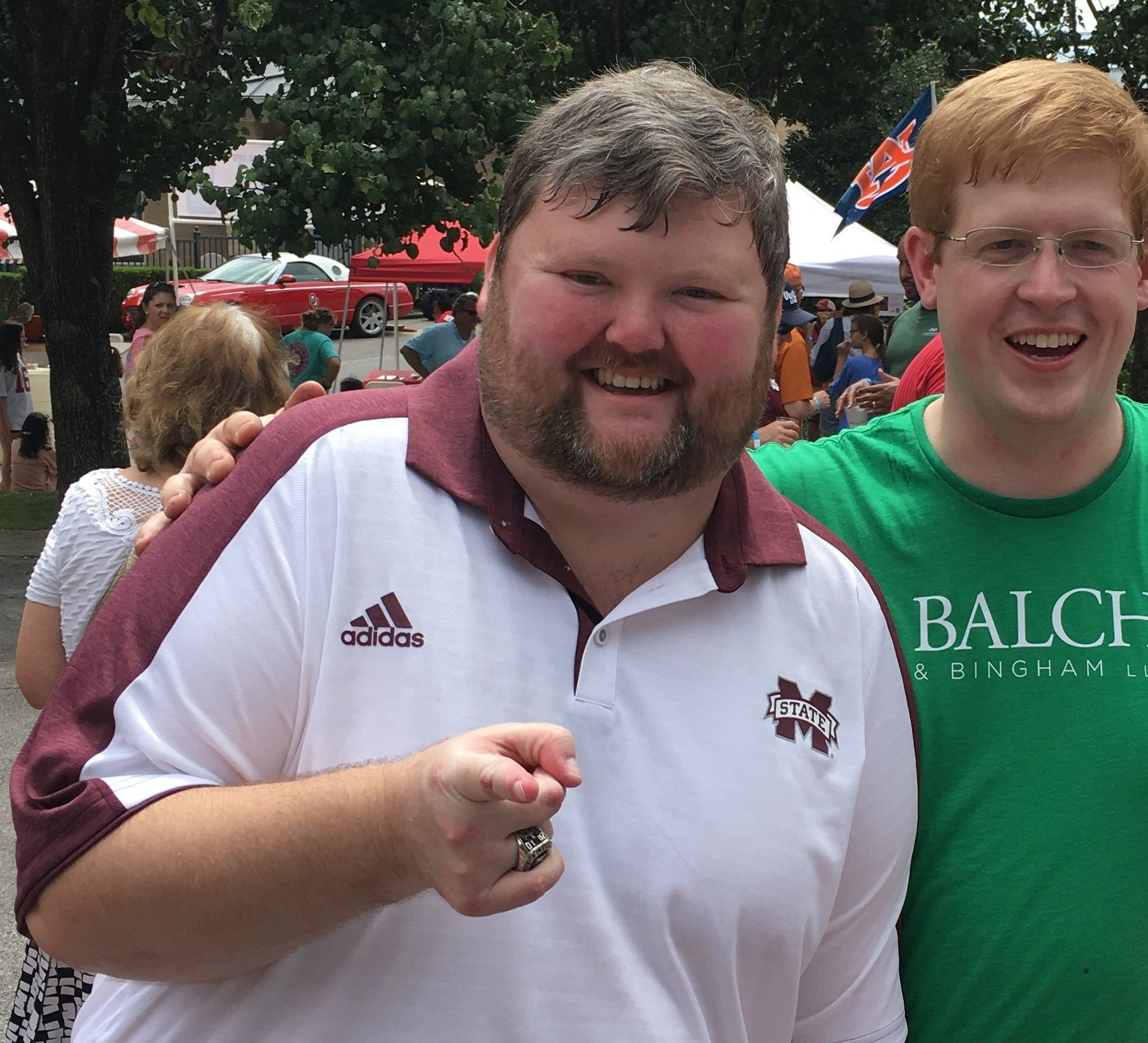
Steven "Stingray" Ray, a noted superfan of Mississippi State sports

- An extremely enthusiastic fan (person) of a sports team or entertainer(s)
- Giles Pellerin (1906–1998), nicknamed Superfan, notable fan of the USC Trojans
- "Bill Swerski's Superfans", a recurring sketch on Saturday Night Live
- Superfan, a 1970s comic strip by Nick Meglin and Jack Davis
- IAE SuperFan, an aircraft engine design study
- Super Fan (game show), a 2020 Indian TV game show
- Superfan (American game show), a 2023 American TV game show

== See also ==
- James Goldstein (born 1940), American businessman who attends a large number of NBA games
