= Mass No. 1 =

Mass No. 1 may refer to:

- Mass No. 1 (Bruckner), in D minor, by Anton Bruckner
- Mass No. 1 (Mozart), in G minor, by Wolfgang Amadeus Mozart
- Mass No. 1 (Schubert), in F major, by Franz Schubert
