= First Rhapsody =

First Rhapsody or Rhapsody No. 1 may refer to the following musical works (arranged alphabetically by surname of composer):

- Hugo Alfvén: Swedish Rhapsody No. 1 for orchestra (1903)
- Béla Bartók: Rhapsody No. 1 (Bartók) for piano and orchestra (1928)
- Johannes Brahms: The first of the two Rhapsodies, Op. 79 (Brahms) for piano solo (1879)
- Claude Debussy: First Rhapsody for clarinet and accompaniment, French title Première rhapsodie (1909–10)
- George Enescu: The first of the two Romanian Rhapsodies (Enescu) for orchestra (1901)
- John Ireland: First Rhapsody (John Ireland) for piano solo (1906)
- Franz Liszt: Hungarian Rhapsody No. 1 for piano solo (c.1851)
