= Point Lookout, Queensland =

Point Lookout
- Town
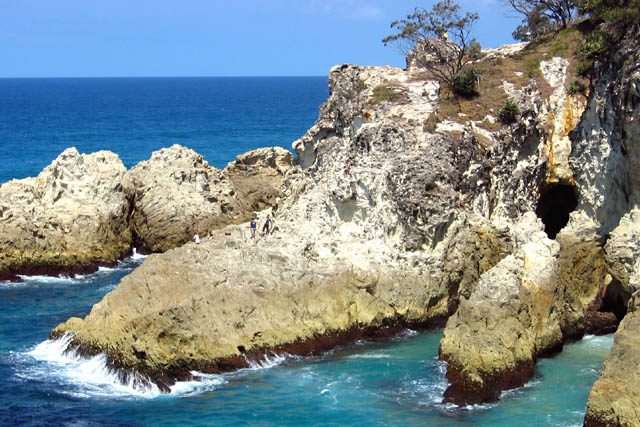
- Eastern wall of the North Gorge, as seen from the Gorge Walk at Point Lookout

- Interactive map of Point Lookout
- Coordinates: 27.4297°S 153.54°E
- Country: Australia
- State: Queensland
- City: North Stradbroke Island
- LGA: Redland City
- Location: 14.1 km (8.8 mi) ENE of Amity; 18.5 km (11.5 mi) NE of Dunwich

Government
  - State electorate: Oodgeroo
  - Federal division: Bowman

Area
  - Total: 4.4 km^{2} (1.7 sq mi)

Population
  - Total: 785 (2021 census)
  - Density: 178.4/km^{2} (462/sq mi)
- Time zone: UTC+10:00 (AEST)
- Postcode: 4183
Localities around Point Lookout
North Stradbroke Island	Coral Sea	Coral Sea
North Stradbroke Island	Point Lookout	Coral Sea
North Stradbroke Island	North Stradbroke Island	Coral Sea

Point Lookout is a headland, small coastal town and locality on the eastern coast of North Stradbroke Island (Minjerribah), Redland City, Queensland, Australia.

In the 2021 census, the locality of Point Lookout had a population of 785 people.

== Geography ==
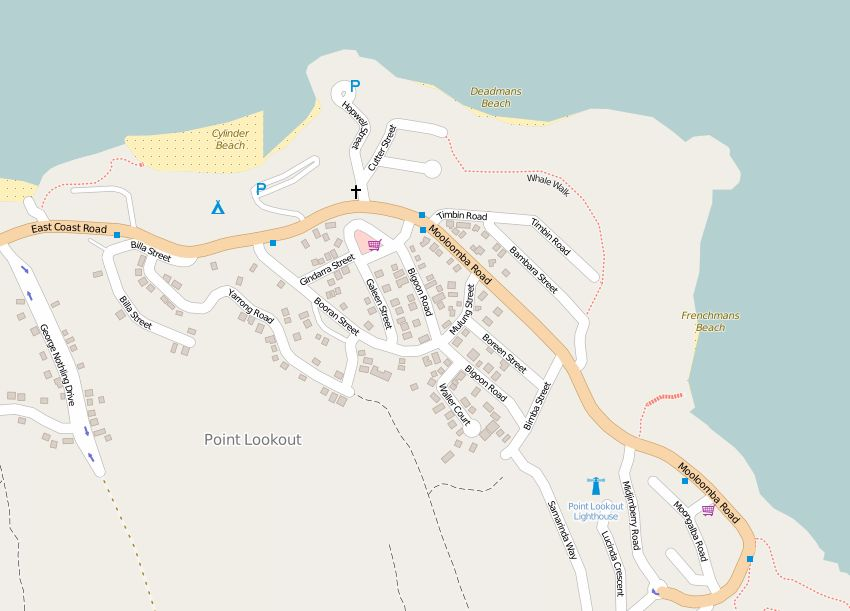
Map of Point Lookout, 2015

Point Lookout is Queensland's most easterly point. To the north lies Cape Moreton and to the south the next major headland is Point Danger on the New South Wales/Queensland border. The other towns on the island are Dunwich and Amity Point.

In the west near the caravan park is Rocky Point and Adder Rock. Cylinder Beach extends eastwards towards Cylinder Headland. Frenchmans Beach fronts Frenchmans Bay. At the eastern extremity is North Gorge and Whale Rock. Offshore are several rocky outcrops above sea level. The headland is an ideal location for land-based seawatching in Australia. Humpback whales can also be seen from here as they migrate along the east coast of Australia. The area is mostly residential houses and tourist apartments built close to the beach and atop nearby ridges to take advantage of sweeping Pacific Ocean views. There are a few shops and a caravan park at Point Lookout.

There is no railway on the island, the nearest station being in Cleveland 19 miles (31 km) to the west. Dunwich airport is 9 miles (14 km) southwest.

=== Climate ===
Point Lookout has a warm humid subtropical climate (Köppen: Cfa) with hot, wet summers and very mild, relatively dry winters. Precipitation is abundant, averaging 1,482.8 millimetres (58.38 in) annually, with an autumn maximum due to its exposed location.

Climate data for Point Lookout (27º26'24"S, 153º33'00"E, 41 m AMSL) (1997–2024 normals and extremes)
Month	Jan	Feb	Mar	Apr	May	Jun	Jul	Aug	Sep	Oct	Nov	Dec	Year
Record high °C (°F)	39.8 (103.6)	35.2 (95.4)	33.3 (91.9)	31.0 (87.8)	28.5 (83.3)	27.5 (81.5)	27.9 (82.2)	31.0 (87.8)	33.9 (93.0)	35.6 (96.1)	32.5 (90.5)	36.5 (97.7)	39.8 (103.6)
Mean daily maximum °C (°F)	29.5 (85.1)	29.3 (84.7)	28.6 (83.5)	26.4 (79.5)	23.8 (74.8)	21.7 (71.1)	21.1 (70.0)	22.1 (71.8)	24.0 (75.2)	25.2 (77.4)	26.6 (79.9)	28.2 (82.8)	25.5 (78.0)
Mean daily minimum °C (°F)	22.7 (72.9)	22.6 (72.7)	22.0 (71.6)	19.7 (67.5)	16.9 (62.4)	14.6 (58.3)	13.8 (56.8)	14.3 (57.7)	16.6 (61.9)	18.5 (65.3)	19.9 (67.8)	21.5 (70.7)	18.6 (65.5)
Record low °C (°F)	14.1 (57.4)	16.6 (61.9)	16.2 (61.2)	11.3 (52.3)	7.1 (44.8)	7.3 (45.1)	6.5 (43.7)	7.0 (44.6)	8.5 (47.3)	7.9 (46.2)	12.7 (54.9)	15.7 (60.3)	6.5 (43.7)
Average precipitation mm (inches)	143.4 (5.65)	153.3 (6.04)	173.4 (6.83)	165.8 (6.53)	147.3 (5.80)	144.5 (5.69)	102.7 (4.04)	55.1 (2.17)	54.4 (2.14)	93.5 (3.68)	115.0 (4.53)	124.5 (4.90)	1,482.8 (58.38)
Average precipitation days (≥ 1.0 mm)	9.8	10.5	12.7	12.4	10.7	9.6	9.1	6.1	5.8	7.4	8.3	9.6	112
Average afternoon relative humidity (%)	71	70	69	68	64	65	62	62	66	68	69	70	67
Average dew point °C (°F)	20.9 (69.6)	21.0 (69.8)	19.8 (67.6)	17.7 (63.9)	14.6 (58.3)	12.8 (55.0)	11.4 (52.5)	12.0 (53.6)	14.7 (58.5)	16.4 (61.5)	17.7 (63.9)	19.7 (67.5)	16.6 (61.8)
Source: Bureau of Meteorology (1997–2024 normals and extremes)

== History ==
The point was sighted and named by James Cook on HMS Endeavour during his exploration of the east coast of Australia on 17 May 1770.

In 1803 Matthew Flinders in the cutter Hope came ashore at Cylinder Beach (Hopewell) to find water as he was returning to Port Jackson (Sydney) after he was wrecked in HMS Porpoise on the Wreck Reefs off Gladstone. It is first recorded contact between the British and the Noonuccal people in this area. The Aboriginal people assisted Flinders in finding fresh water to fill his barrels.

The Point Lookout Lighthouse was constructed in 1932, which is still in use today.

On 14 May 1943, the single greatest loss of life resulting from a submarine attack in Australian waters occurred 23 nautical miles (43 km; 26 mi) ENE off Point Lookout when the hospital ship AHS Centaur was sunk by a Japanese submarine. On 15 May 1994 Minister for Veterans Affairs, Con Sciacca, officially unveiled a memorial to the sinking of the Centaur on Cylinder Beach Headland.

The Point Lookout Library opened in 2011.

== Demographics ==
In the 2016 census, the locality of Point Lookout had a population of 713 people, 47.1% female and 52.9% male. The median age of the Point Lookout population was 53 years, 15 years above the national median of 38. 72.1% of people living in Point Lookout were born in Australia. The other top responses for country of birth were England 4.7%, New Zealand 2.1%, South Africa 1.4%, United States of America 1% and Philippines 0.7%. 85.2% of people spoke only English at home; the next most common languages were French 0.6%, Croatian 0.4% and Japanese 0.4%.

In the 2021 census, the locality of Point Lookout had a population of 785 people, 47.6% female and 52.2% male. The median age of the Point Lookout population was 55 years. 71.5% of people living in Point Lookout were born in Australia. The other top responses for country of birth were England 5%, New Zealand 2%, United States of America 1.8%, South Africa 1%, and Thailand 0.9%. 83.2% of people spoke only English at home; the next most common languages were Italian 0.9%, Thai 0.8% and German 0.5%.

== Heritage listings ==
Point Lookout has one heritage site, Point Lookout Foreshore along East Coast Road (27.4306°S 153.5376°E).

== Education ==
There are no schools in Point Lookout. The nearest government primary school is Dunwich State School in Dunwich to the south-west. The nearest government secondary school is Cleveland District State High School in Cleveland on the mainland.

== Amenities ==
The Redland City Council operates a public library at the Point Lookout Community Hall (27.4260°S 153.5210°E) at 74–84 Dickson Way (also known as East Coast Road).

== Attractions ==
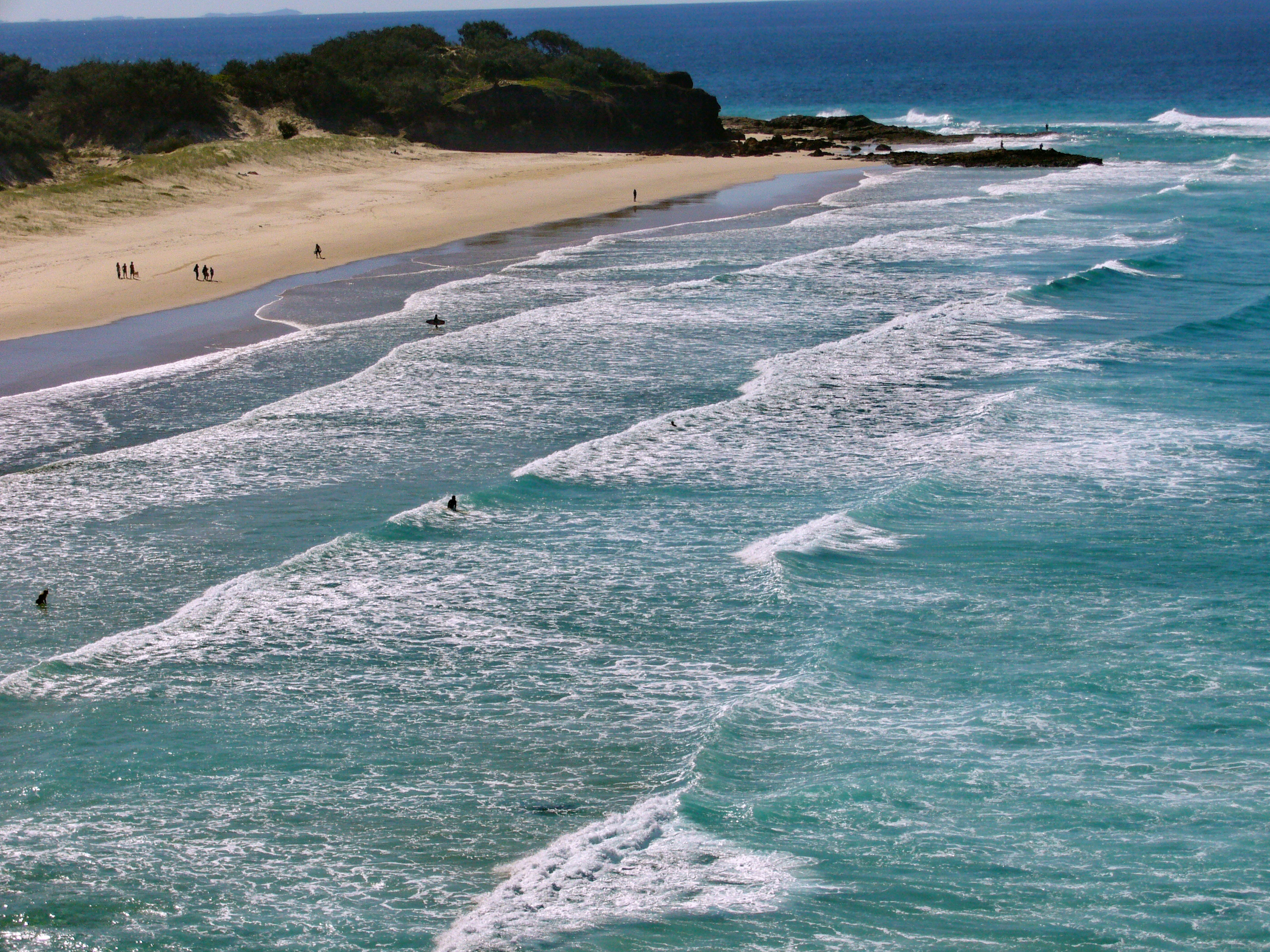
Frenchman's beach, 2010

There is a monument commemorating the naming of Point Lookout by James Cook in 1770. It is opposite 19 Mooloomba Road, near the Gorge Walk (27.4330°S 153.5440°E).

There is a monument commemorating the assistance the Aboriginal people gave to Matthew Flinders in 1803. It is at Hopewell Street on the Cylinder Beach Headland (27.4244°S 153.5350°E).

There is a monument commemorating the Stradbroke Island Radar Site, which was part of Australia's air defence network during World War II. It is on the Gorge Walk off Headland Park Access Road (27.4353°S 153.5441°E).

There is a monument commemorating the sinking of the AHS Centaur in Hopewell Street on Cylinder Beach Headland (27.4247°S 153.5353°E).

== See also ==
- List of seawatching locations by country
