= Number One (Billie Godfrey album) =

Studio album by Billie Godfrey
- Released: 5 September 2001
- Genre: Pop
- Length: 44:40
- Label: Jvc Victor
- Producer: Mark Summers

Number One is the first full-length studio album released by the British singer Billie Godfrey, in 2001. Godfrey sings entirely in Japanese despite not being a native Japanese speaker - something no other western artist has so far achieved. It was released in Japan but also sold in the UK and US as an import. The concept for the album was conceived and produced by Mark Summers for his music label Scorccio Records (now known as Scorccio Sample Replays). His vision was to produce Pop and R&B songs for the Japanese market, to be sung in Japanese - but sung by a native English vocalist. The English written songs were all translated into Japanese by musician Emiko Kawakami, following this Summers and Godfrey booked 5 days at a West London studio to record all the vocals for the album. Within the first hour of recording, it soon became apparent how difficult it was for anyone non-Japanese to read the translated text and sing it fluently. Mark Summers then quickly devised a phonetic technique for Billie Godfrey - to be able to sing as if she was fluent in Japanese, which most listeners in Japan believed she truly was.

== Track listing ==
1. "Number One"
2. "Day By Day"
3. "I'm - Lovin' You"
4. "Sweet Dreaming"
5. "Something I Can Keep"
6. "Liberar Vida"
7. "When U Were With Me"
8. "Who Knows"
9. "Always"
10. "Intergroove"
11. "Heaven & Earth"
12. "Intergroove # 2"
13. "Number One" - Scorccio Remix
14. "I'm - Lovin' You" (Reprise)
