= Point Lookout, Pleasants County, West Virginia =

Point Lookout
- Unincorporated community
- Location within the state of West Virginia Point Lookout (the United States)
- Coordinates: 39°27′5″N 81°4′47″W
- Country: United States
- State: West Virginia
- County: Pleasants
- Elevation: 991 ft (302 m)
- Time zone: UTC-5 (Eastern (EST))
  - Summer (DST): UTC-4 (EDT)
- GNIS ID: 1678562

Point Lookout is an unincorporated community in Pleasants County, West Virginia, United States.
