= Engine Company 1 Fire Station =

- Engine Company 1, Ladder Company 6
- U.S. National Register of Historic Places
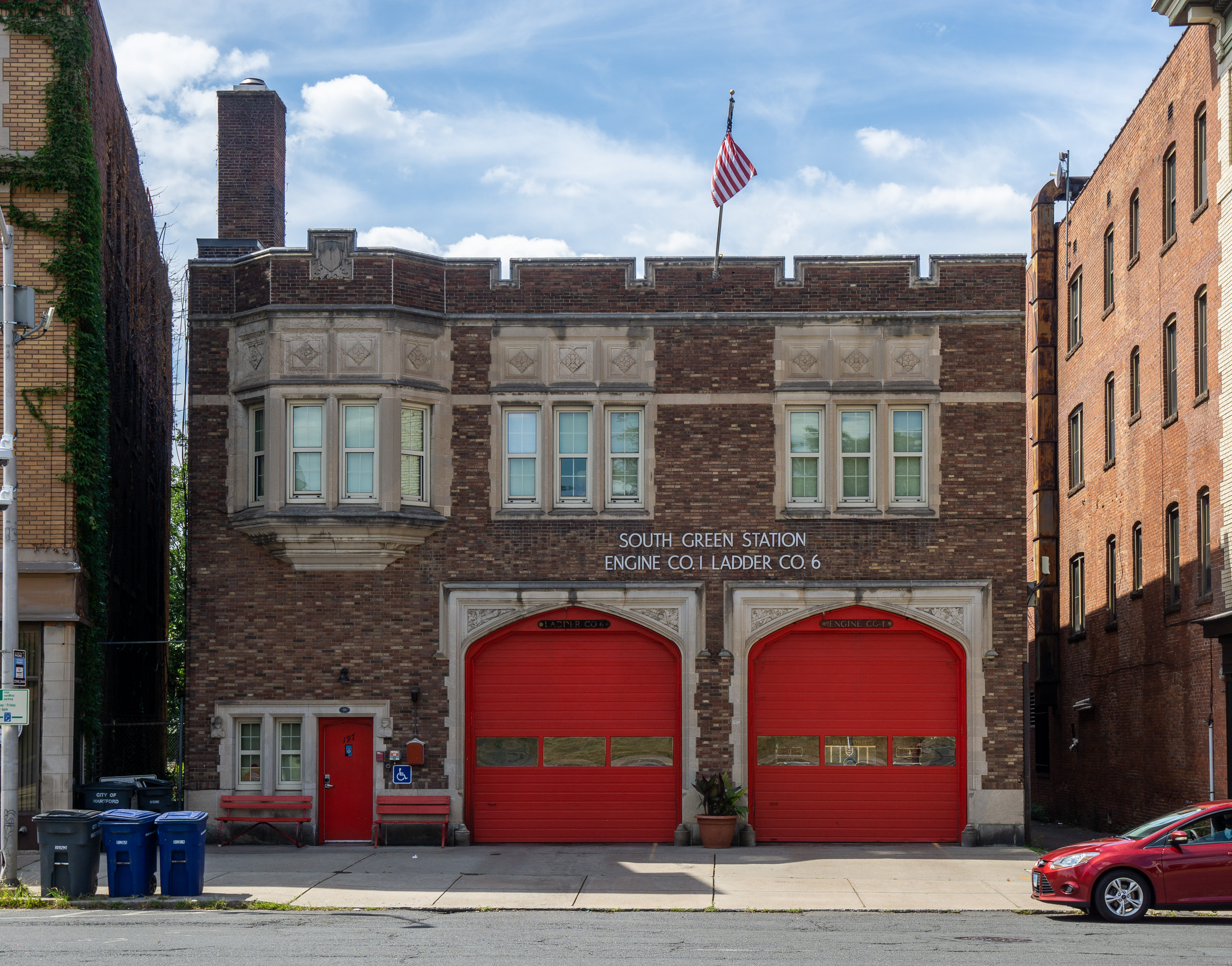

- Location within Connecticut Location within the United States
- Location: 197 Main Street, Hartford, Connecticut
- Coordinates: 41°45′29″N 72°40′35″W
- Area: less than one acre
- Built: 1920
- Architect: Ebbets & Frid
- Architectural style: Classical Revival, Collegiate Gothic
- MPS: Firehouses of Hartford MPS
- NRHP reference No.: 89000025
- Added to NRHP: March 2, 1989

The South Green Fire Station, also known as the Engine Company 1 Fire Station, is at 197 Main St. in downtown Hartford, Connecticut. Built in 1927, it is an architecturally distinctive example of Classical and Collegiate Gothic Revival architecture, designed by a prominent local firm. The station, as well as the former fire equipment maintenance house behind it at 36 John Street, were listed on the National Register of Historic Places in 1989. The station presently houses Engine Company 1 and Ladder Company 6 of the Hartford Fire Department.

== Description and history ==
The South Green Fire Station is located in downtown Hartford, on the west side of Main Street, between Charter Oak Avenue and Park Streets. It occupies the eastern half of a lot that extends west to John Street. The station is a two-story masonry structure, built out of brick with limestone trim. Its front facade is three bays wide, with equipment bays in the two right bays, and a pedestrian entrance to the left. The equipment bays have pointed-arch openings, squared off by limestone trim with carved depictions of firefighting equipment. Above each of these bays is a band of three sash windows, each of which has a tone panel with a diamond shape at its center. The left bay has an oriel window above it. The station was the second to be built for Engine Company 1, established in 1864 when the city created a paid professional fire service. The company's first building also occupied this site: an Italianate structure, it was replaced to better meet the requirements of motorized fire equipment.

The former maintenance building is a rectangular brick building with modest Classical Revival features. It was built in 1920 and originally housed specialized equipment for servicing fire engines. It now houses professional offices.

== See also ==
- National Register of Historic Places listings in Hartford, Connecticut
