= Fire Hall No. 1 (Nashville, Tennessee) =

- U.S. National Register of Historic Places
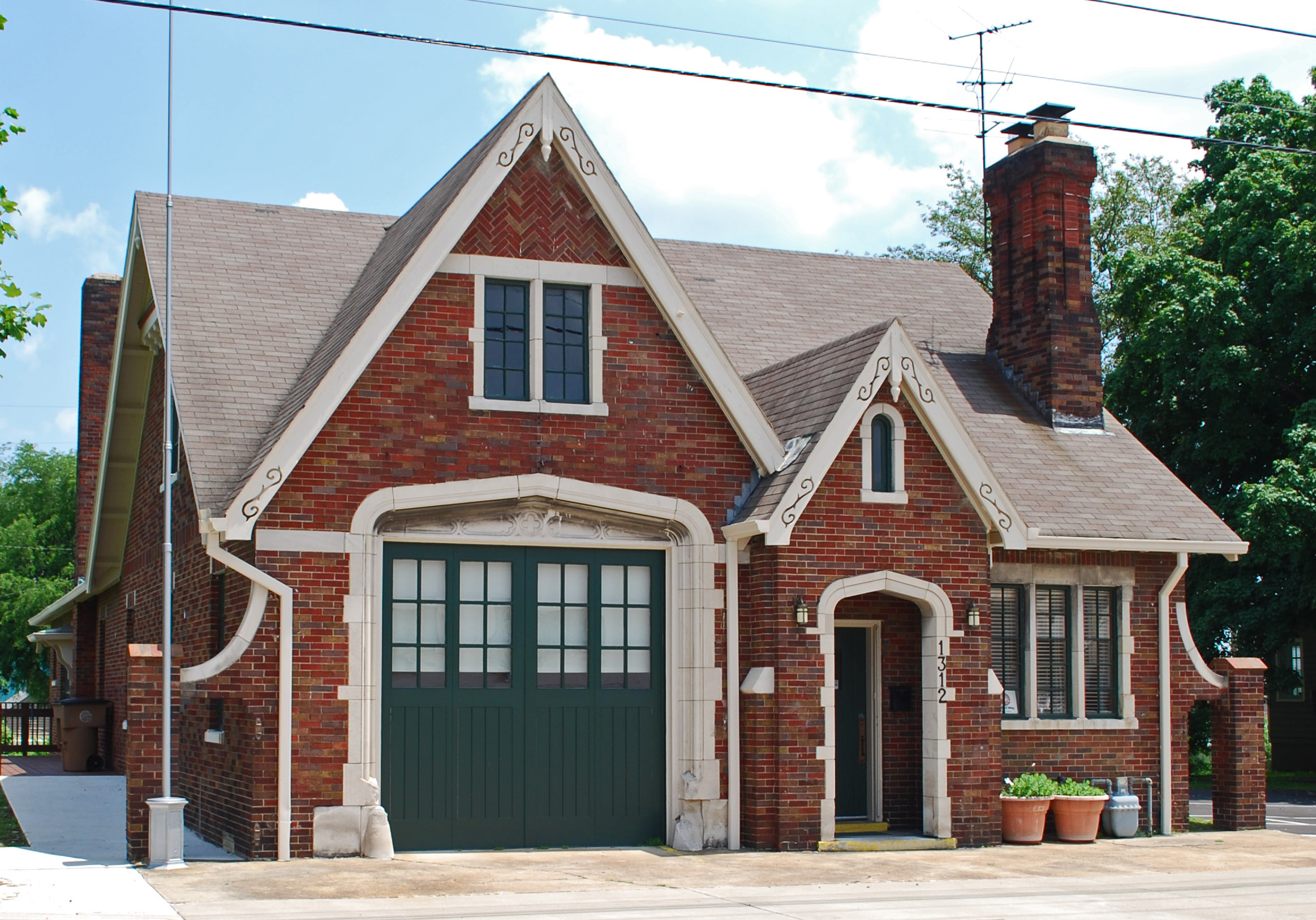

- Location within Tennessee
- Location: 1312 3rd Ave. N., Nashville, Tennessee
- Coordinates: 36°10′43″N 86°47′12″W
- Area: less than one acre
- Built: 1936
- Architectural style: Tudor Revival
- MPS: Fire Halls of Nashville, Tennessee, 1860-1936
- NRHP reference No.: 08000691
- Added to NRHP: July 23, 2008

The Fire Hall No. 1 in Nashville, Tennessee, at 1312 3rd Ave. N., was built in 1936. It was listed on the National Register of Historic Places in 2008.

It is a 1 1/2-story fire station which was designed to appear residential, with elements of Tudor Revival style.

It has also been known as the "Germantown Fire Hall and as the George W. Swint Sr. Engine Company No. 1.

In 2008, it was owned by Neighborhoods Resource Center, which planned to convert it into offices.

It is located just outside the boundary of the Germantown Historic District, which is also listed on the National Register.
