= Number One (New Caledonian beer) =

- Manufacturer: Grand Brewery of New Caledonia
- Introduced: 1972
- Alcohol by volume: 5.0%
- Style: Lager

Number One is a brand of blonde lager manufactured in New Caledonia by the Grand Brewery of New Caledonia (GBNC). It is regarded as the national beer of New Caledonia.

== History ==
The Grand Brewery of Nouméa (GBN) was founded by Edouard Pentecost in 1969, whose son, Michel Pentecost, created the recipe for Number One in 1972 alongside an Alsatian brewer. In 1974, the GBN merged with the Grand Caledonian Brewery (GBC), owned by Dutch brand Heineken, to form the Grand Brewery of New Caledonia (GBNC).

In 1993, Number One was awarded a gold medal by the International Institute of Quality Selections (IISQ) in Brussels, Belgium.

In 2004, the GBNC launched Panach One, which contains 20% of Number One and titrates at less than 1.0% alcohol.
