= Des Moines Fire Department Headquarters =

- Des Moines Fire Department Headquarters: Fire Station No. 1 and Shop Building
- U.S. National Register of Historic Places
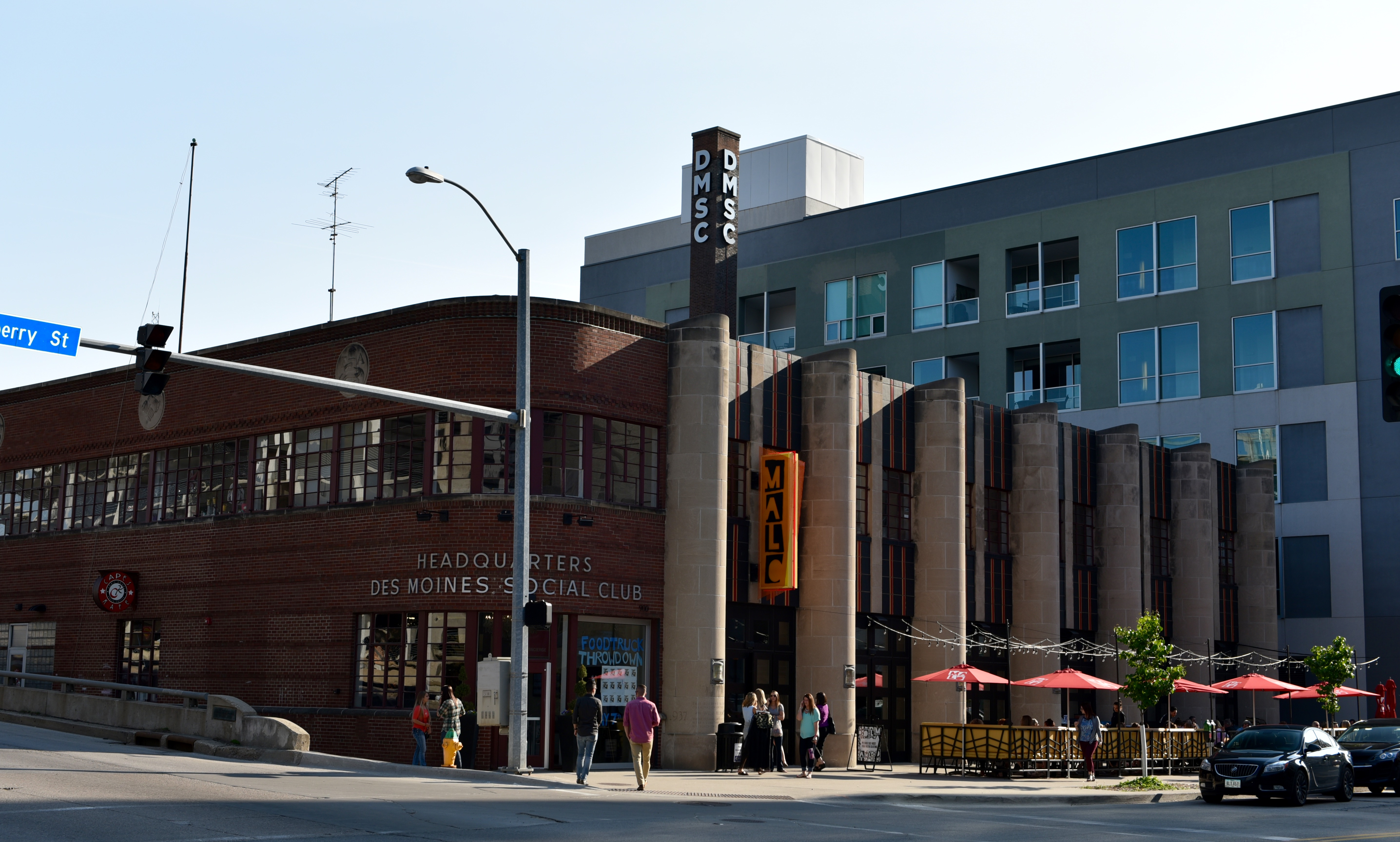

- Location within Iowa Location within the United States
- Location: 900 Mulberry St., 100 9th St., Des Moines, Iowa
- Coordinates: 41°35′01.9″N 93°37′41.6″W
- Area: less than one acre (0.40 ha)
- Built: 1937; 89 years ago
- Built by: F.B. Dickinson & Co.
- Architect: Proudfoot, Rawson, Brooks and Borg
- Architectural style: Modern; Art Deco
- NRHP reference No.: 14000113
- Added to NRHP: April 7, 2014

The Des Moines Fire Department Headquarters' Fire Station No. 1 and Shop Building are historic buildings located in downtown Des Moines, Iowa, United States. Completed in 1937, the facility provided a unified campus for the fire department's administration, citywide dispatch, training, maintenance, as well as the increased need for fire protective services in the commercial and warehouse districts in which the complex is located. It was designed by the Des Moines architectural firm of Proudfoot, Rawson, Brooks and Borg, and built by local contractor F.B. Dickinson & Co. The project provided jobs for local residents during the Great Depression, and 45% of its funding was provided by the Public Works Administration (PWA). The City of Des Moines provided the rest of the funds. The radio tower, which shares the historic designation with the building, was used to dispatch fire personnel from 1958 to 1978. The buildings were used by the local fire department from 1937 to 2013. It was replaced by two different facilities. The old fire station and shop building was acquired by the Des Moines Social Club, a nonprofit arts organization.

The buildings were designed in the Streamline Moderne style with Art Deco elements. The two-story brick fire station features stone pilasters that divide the fire apparatus bay openings. A seventh bay was added in 1967 as part of the building's renovation when a new viaduct blocked the east elevation of the building. The corner of the building at Mulberry and Ninth Streets is rounded, and there is a ribbon of windows on the second floor. The shop building sits behind the station building, facing Ninth Street. It features two garage door bays that are connected to the roofline by large stone panels. A zigzag motif in brick functions as a cornice. A courtyard brick wall connects the station to the shop building. The facility was listed on the National Register of Historic Places in 2014.
