= To Be Number One =

To Be Number One may refer to:

- To Be Number One (film), a 1991 Hong Kong film
- The English version of "Un'estate italiana", a song composed for the 1990 FIFA World Cup held in Italy
