= Point Lookout Archaeological Site =

Archaeological site in Virginia, United States

- U.S. National Register of Historic Places
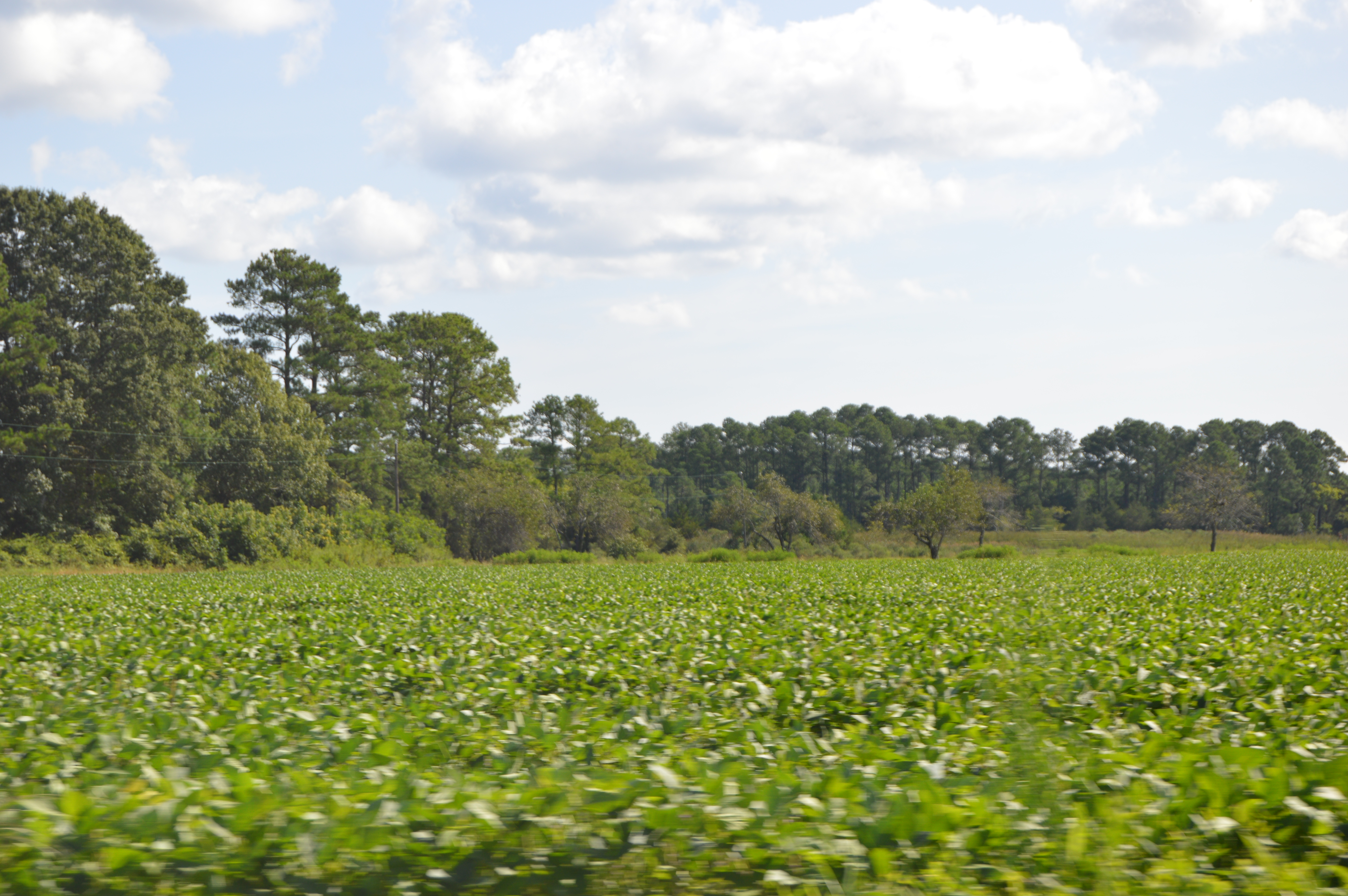
- Overview from the west

- Location within Virginia Location within the United States
- Location: Robins Neck, Gloucester County, Virginia
- Coordinates: 37.3468°N 76.4467°W
- Area: 7 acres (2.8 ha)
- Built: 1642
- Built by: John Robins
- NRHP reference No.: 14000234
- Added to NRHP: May 19, 2014

The Point Lookout Archaeological Site is an archaeological site encompassing the historic remains of the original homestead of John Robins, one of the first English settlers of what is now Gloucester County, Virginia. The site, located on what is now called Robins Neck, consists of a domestic site that was active from the mid-17th to the mid-19th century, and includes the remains of Robins' c. 1642 house. A secondary site on the property includes a trash pit and refuse area associated with a 19th-century smokehouse.

The site was added to the National Register of Historic Places in 2014.

== See also ==
- National Register of Historic Places listings in Gloucester County, Virginia
