= Piano Quintet No. 1 =

Piano Quintet No. 1 may refer to:

- Piano Quintet No. 1 (Bloch)
- Piano Quintet No. 1 (Dvořák)
- Piano Quintet No. 1 (Farrenc)
- Piano Quintet No. 1 (Fauré)
