= World number 1 ranked tennis players =

The following are lists of world number 1 ranked players in tennis:

== Men ==
- World number 1 ranked male tennis players, all-time singles rankings
- List of ATP number 1 ranked singles tennis players, since 1973
- List of ATP number 1 ranked doubles tennis players, since 1976

== Women ==
- World number 1 ranked female tennis players, all-time singles rankings
- List of WTA number 1 ranked singles tennis players, since 1975
- List of WTA number 1 ranked doubles tennis players, since 1984

== See also ==
- Top ten ranked male tennis players
- Top ten ranked male tennis players (1912–1972)
- Top ten ranked female tennis players
- Top ten ranked female tennis players (1921–1974)
