= String Quartet no. 1 (van Wyk) =

Arnold van Wyk's String Quartet No. 1 was composed between 1944–46. The work was first performed on 10 May 1947 in Heidelberg, South Africa by Jeremy Schulman, Erica Jolley, Lettie Vermaak and Aubrey Rainier. The first British performance was on BBC Radio 3 on 7 July 1947 by the Zorian Quartet. The work is dedicated to Freda Baron, and was recorded on Claremont CD GSE 1525 with Jürgen Schwietering (violin), Petri Salonen (violin), Leo Luytendijk (viola) and Eric Martens (cello) in 1993. The British composer (and life-long friend of van Wyk, Howard Ferguson, praised the work for its structural innovation and emotional depth.

== Background ==
Van Wyk composed the quartet during the last years of the Second World War, while living in London, where he had moved in 1938 to study at the Royal Academy of Music. Stephanus Muller, who ranks the work along with Van Wyk's First Symphony as one of his most important compositions from his London period, notes that the title of the work is misleading, as it was preceded by Van Wyk's Five Elegies for String Quartet, and there was to be no Second String Quartet. Muller has traced the precursors to Van Wyk's mature string quartet writing in an article focusing on Van Wyk's juvenilia. Van Wyk wrote an extended programme note for the quartet, noting his interest in 'resulting tonality' (a process of juxtaposing distantly related keys embedded with overlapping pitches) and a new sort of variation form. Howard Ferguson also noted the quartet's introspective and at times turbulent musical language.

== Composition and Structure ==
The First String Quartet is structured in three movements, a departure from the traditional four-movement form of classical string quartets. The composer originally conceived a different order for the movements, later revising the sequence to enhance the dramatic effect. The finalised version of the string quartet has the following movements:

1. Allegro appassionato
2. Scherzo: Presto ansioso
3. Adagio non troppo – Calmo – Allegretto – Larghetto sostenuto e solenne – A piacere (Lento senza tempo)

The first movement opens with a long-lined theme played by the viola and cello in unison against sustained trills. This establishes the work’s characteristic harmonic ambiguity, as the movement oscillates between different tonal centers. The Scherzo, marked "Presto ansioso", conveys an unsettling, ghostly character through muted strings and rapid figurations. The final Adagio movement is a slow set of variations in C major with F# accidentals, and it is particularly significant in establishing the overall structure of the quartet. This movement is the most expansive of the three, and unfolds as a series of variations that gradually transform the initial theme before concluding in an ambiguous and unresolved manner.

== Modernist Aesthetic and Bartók Influence ==
Van Wyk’s First String Quartet reflects a synthesis of modernist and traditional elements. His harmonic language, while rooted in tonality, incorporates modal inflections and chromatic shifts that disrupt conventional expectations. Magtild Wium’s analysis of Arnold van Wyk’s First String Quartet positions the work within a rich context of personal and cultural ambiguity. She interprets the quartet as a "farewell" composition, analogous to Bartók’s Sixth String Quartet, and notes that both composers revised their formal plans to conclude with a slow, elegiac final movement—suggesting a shift towards introspection and programmatic intent. Wium emphasizes how Van Wyk’s compositional process reflects his ambivalence about returning to South Africa from England, revealing the conflicted nature of his colonial identity, with neither place offering a stable sense of home. Through meticulous sketch analysis and comparison with Bartók, she frames the quartet as an artistic negotiation of displacement, marking Van Wyk’s complex position as a colonial composer seeking meaning between cultural peripheries.

== Premiere and Reception ==
The First String Quartet was first performed in 1947 in Heidelberg, South Africa, though Van Wyk had initially hoped for a London premiere. The performance received a mixed reception, with some critics struggling to interpret its harmonic and formal complexity. One reviewer, influenced by the political climate of the time, focused more on Van Wyk’s identity as a "farmer-boy" returning from Europe than on the musical substance of the work. Another commentator, however, recognized the quartet’s expressive power, interpreting it as a reflection of wartime suffering and the human condition.

Boosey & Hawkes published the quartet in 1955.

== Recordings ==
The work was recorded in 1993, as part of an album titled Chamber Music by GSE Claremont Records.
