= Engine Company Number One (Augusta, Georgia) =

- U.S. National Register of Historic Places
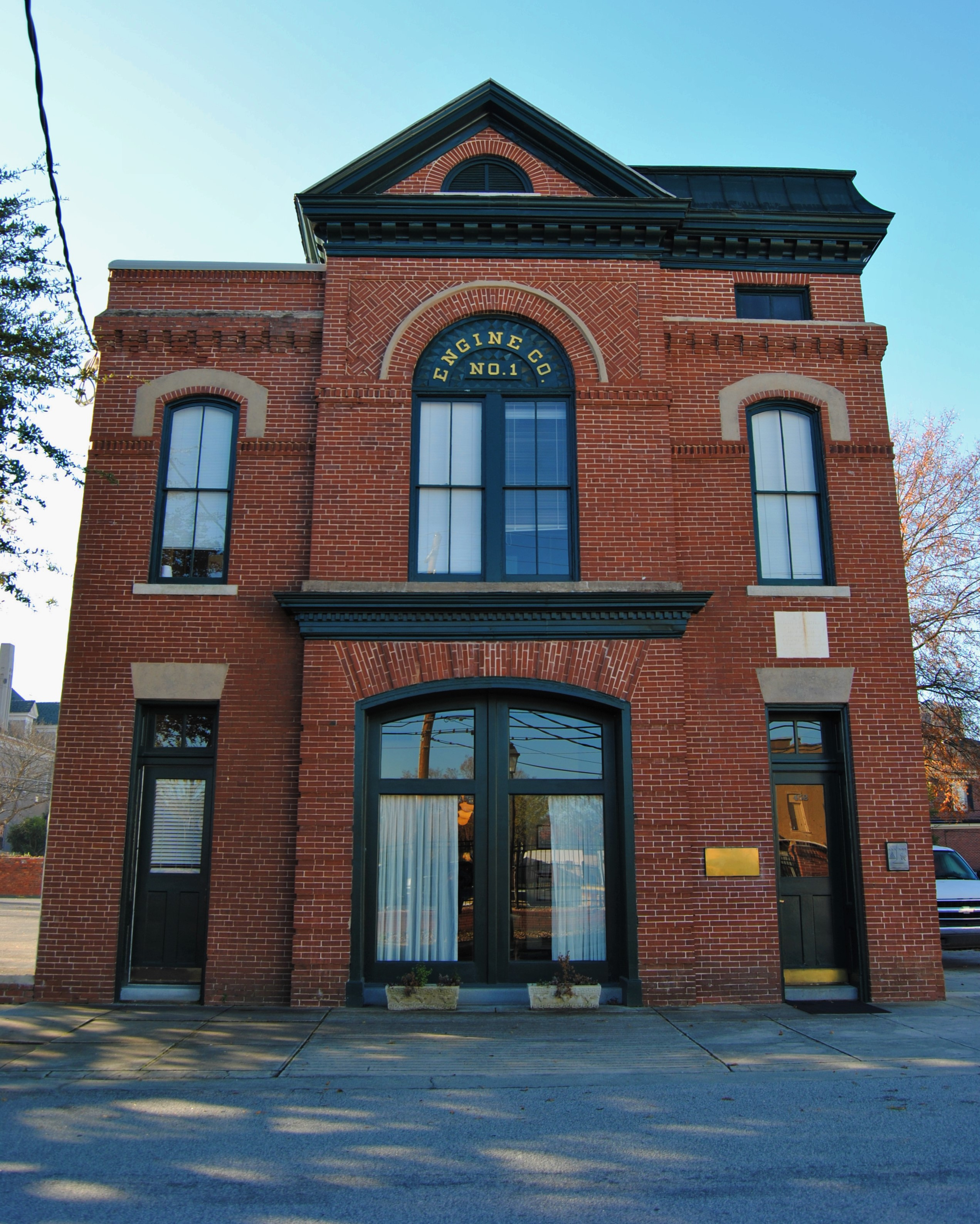

- Location within Georgia
- Location: 452 Ellis St., Augusta, Georgia
- Coordinates: 33°28′17″N 81°57′34″W
- Area: less than one acre
- Built: 1892
- Built by: G.L. Rounds
- Architect: Lewis Ford Goodrich
- Architectural style: Italianate, Romanesque
- NRHP reference No.: 88000565
- Added to NRHP: May 25, 1988

The Engine Company Number One in Augusta, Georgia, at 452 Ellis St., was built in 1892. It was listed on the National Register of Historic Places in 1988.

It is a red brick building which was the first fire station built for the City of Augusta's paid fire department.
