= Look Out =

Look Out may refer to:

- Look Out! (Stanley Turrentine album), 1960
- Look Out! (Johnny "Hammond" Smith album), 1962
- Look Out – Phineas Is Back!, 1978 album by Phineas Newborn Jr.
- Look Out! (20/20 album), 1981 album by 20/20
- "Look Out!" (song), 2018 song by Rusko
- "Look Out (Here Comes Tomorrow)", 1967 song on the Monkees album, More of the Monkees

== See also ==
- Lookout (disambiguation)
