= Piano Concerto No. 1 =

Piano Concerto No. 1 refers to the first piano concerto published by one of a number of composers:

- Piano Concerto No. 1 (Bartók) (Sz. 83), by Béla Bartók
- Piano Concerto No. 1 (Beethoven) (Op. 15), by Ludwig van Beethoven
- Piano Concerto No. 1 (Brahms) (Op. 15), by Johannes Brahms
- Piano Concerto No. 1 (Chopin) (Op. 11), by Frédéric Chopin
- Piano Concerto No. 1 (Emerson) (1977), by Keith Emerson
- Piano Concerto No. 1 (Ginastera) (Op. 28) by Alberto Ginastera
- Piano Concerto No. 1 (Glass) (Tirol Concerto for Piano and Orchestra, 2000), by Philip Glass
- Piano Concerto No. 1 (Glazunov) (Op. 92, 1911) by Alexander Glazunov
- Piano Concerto No. 1 (Kabalevsky) (Op. 9), by Dmitry Kabalevsky
- Piano Concerto No. 1 (Lehnhoff) (2005), by Dieter Lehnhoff
- Piano Concerto No. 1 (Lieberson) (1983) by Peter Lieberson
- Piano Concerto No. 1 (Lindberg) (1994) by Magnus Lindberg
- Piano Concerto No. 1 (Liszt) (S. 124), by Franz Liszt
- Piano Concerto No. 1 (Mendelssohn) (Op. 25), by Felix Mendelssohn
- Piano Concerto No. 1 (Mozart) (KV 37), by Wolfgang Mozart
- Piano Concerto No. 1 (Prokofiev) (Op. 10), by Sergei Prokofiev
- Piano Concerto No. 1 (Rachmaninoff) (Op. 1), by Sergei Rachmaninoff
- Piano Concerto No. 1 (Rubinstein) (Op. 25, 1858) by Anton Rubinstein
- Piano Concerto No. 1 (Saint-Saëns) (Op. 17), by Camille Saint-Saëns
- Piano Concerto No. 1 (Shostakovich) (Op. 35), by Dmitri Shostakovich
- Piano Concerto No. 1 (Tchaikovsky) (Op. 23), by Pyotr Tchaikovsky
- Piano Concerto No. 1 (Villa-Lobos) (1945), by Heitor Villa-Lobos

It may also refer to the only concerto, or first of an alternately named piece:

- Piano Concerto (Barber) (Op. 38), by Samuel Barber
- Piano Concerto (Busoni) (Op. 39), by Ferrucio Busoni
- Piano Concerto (Cowell) (1928), by Henry Cowell
- Piano Concerto (Dvořák) (Op. 33), by Antonín Dvořák
- Piano Concerto (Furtwängler) (1937), by Wilhelm Furtwängler
- Concerto in F (Gershwin) (1925), by George Gershwin
- Piano Concerto (Grieg) (Op. 16), by Edvard Grieg
- Piano Concerto (Khachaturian) (1936), by Aram Khachaturian
- Piano Concerto (Ligeti) (1988), by György Ligeti
- Piano Concerto in G (Ravel) (1931), by Maurice Ravel
- Concierto heroico (1943), by Joaquín Rodrigo
- Piano Concerto (Schoenberg) (Op. 42), by Arnold Schoenberg
- Piano Concerto (Schumann) (Op. 54), by Robert Schumann
- Piano Concerto (Scriabin) (Op. 20), by Alexander Scriabin

== See also ==
- List of compositions for piano and orchestra
