= Cello Sonata No. 1 =

Cello Sonata No. 1 may refer to:

- Cello Sonatas Nos. 1 and 2 (Beethoven), by Ludwig van Beethoven
- Cello Sonata No. 1 (Brahms), by Johannes Brahms
- Cello Sonata No. 1 (Mendelssohn), by Felix Mendelssohn
- Cello Sonata No. 1 (Reger), by Max Reger
- Cello Sonata No. 1 (Ries), by Ferdinand Ries
- Cello Sonata No. 1 (Fauré), by Gabriel Fauré
- Cello Sonata No. 1 (Oswald), by Henrique Oswald
