= Seawatching =

Observation of seabirds from land

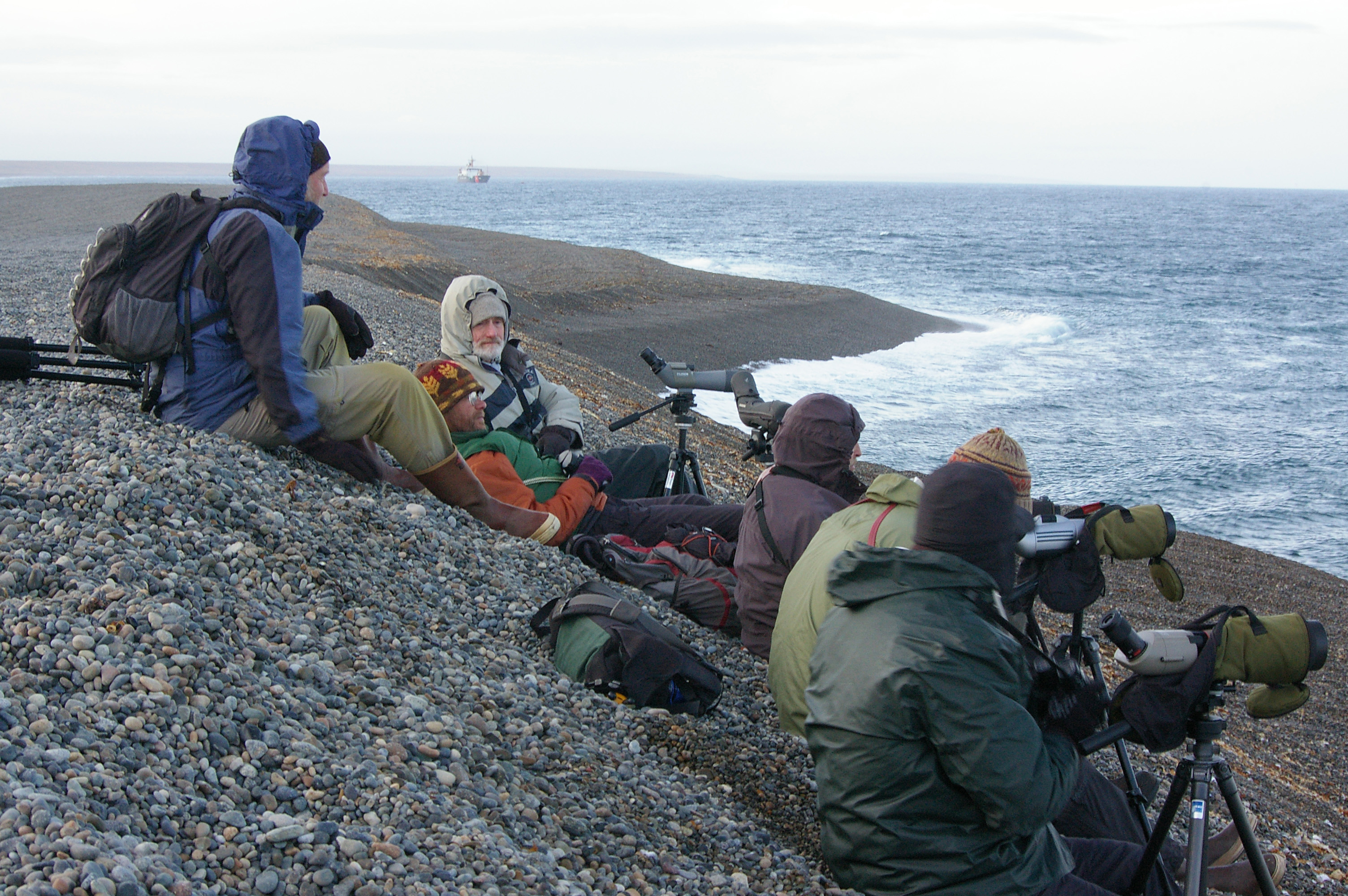
Seawatchers in Gambell, Alaska

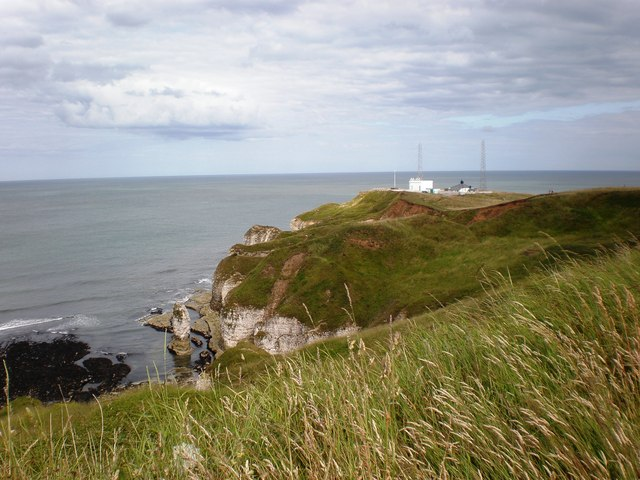
Flamborough Head in northern England is a good place for seawatching

Seawatching is a type of birdwatching where participants observe seabirds from a fixed point on the mainland. They may do this from a coastal location, usually a headland, looking out to sea, or from a boat or ship.

Seawatching is commonly performed during bird migration seasons, and particularly when weather conditions are suitable. Successful seawatching is very dependent on the weather. When the weather is fine, birds often stay out to sea, and pelagic trips are then a more effective way to observe them; if onshore winds combine with rain, birds can be forced to migrate close to shore.

Groups of birds for which seawatching is an effective observation method include petrels, terns and skuas.

== See also ==
- List of seawatching locations by country
