= Violin Sonata No. 1 =

Violin Sonata No. 1 may refer to:

- Violin Sonata No. 1 (Beethoven)
- Violin Sonata No. 1 (Bloch)
- Violin Sonata No. 1 (Brahms)
- Violin Sonata No. 1 (Fauré)
- Violin Sonata No. 1 (Grieg)
- Violin Sonata No. 1 (Ives) by Charles Ives
- Violin Sonata No. 1 (Mozart)
- Violin Sonata No. 1 (Prokofiev)
- Violin Sonata No. 1 (Saint-Saëns)
- Violin Sonata No. 1 (Schumann)
- Violin Sonata No. 1 (Stanford)
- Violin Sonata No. 1 (Ysaÿe)
