= Point Lookout Light, Australia =

Point Lookout Light
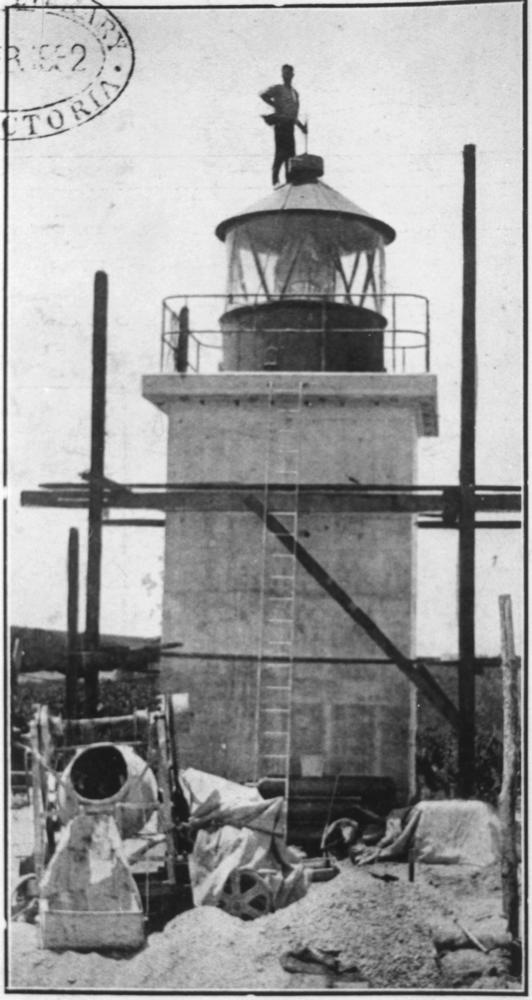
- Construction of the Lighthouse, 1932
- Location: Point Lookout; Queensland; Australia
- Coordinates: 27°25′53.83″S 153°32′25.41″E

Tower
- Constructed: 1932
- Construction: concrete tower
- Height: 16 feet (4.9 m)
- Shape: square tower and lantern removed
- Markings: white tower
- Operator: Australian Maritime Safety Authority

Light
- Focal height: 256 feet (78 m)
- Range: 15 nautical miles (28 km; 17 mi)
- Characteristic: Fl (3) W 15s.

Point Lookout Light is an active lighthouse on Point Lookout, a headland on North Stradbroke Island, Queensland, Australia.

== History ==
A proposal for a lighthouse and a signal station on Point Lookout were made as early as 1825. A pilot station was built in 1825 elsewhere on the island, on Amity Point, lighting the South Passage into Moreton Bay. In 1848 this pilot station was also moved.

A lighthouse on Point Lookout was finally constructed in 1932, the first settlement at the point. The light source was a carbide lamp operated by acetylene gas, and a hut for storage of the gas cylinders was built at the close by beach, which was to be named Cylinder Beach for this reason.

== Structure and display ==
The lighthouse is 16-foot (4.9 m) high, made of concrete and painted white. The current display is three white flashes every 15 seconds (Fl.(3)W. 15s).

== See also ==
- List of lighthouses in Australia
