= Nature reserves in the North Norfolk Coast Site of Special Scientific Interest =

Protected area in Norfolk, England

North Norfolk Coast SSSI
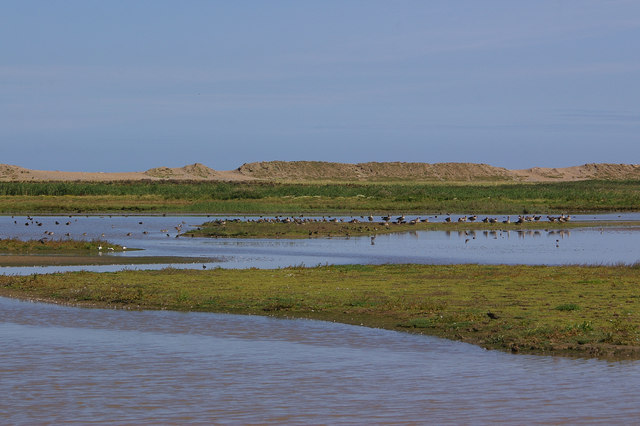
- Cley Marshes

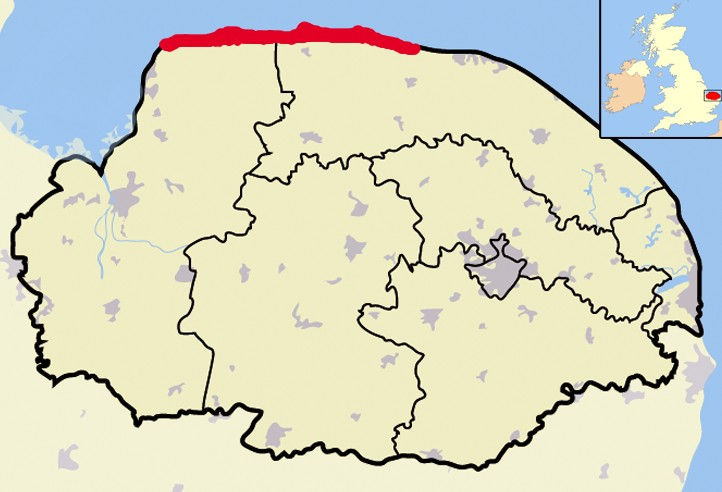
- North Norfolk Coast SSSI shown within Norfolk in red
- Location: Norfolk, East of England, England
- Established: 1986

The North Norfolk Coast Site of Special Scientific Interest (SSSI) is an internationally important protected area in Norfolk, England. The SSSI is a long, narrow strip of coastal land that starts between Old Hunstanton and Holme-next-the-Sea, and runs east for about 43 km (27 mi) to Kelling. The southern boundary runs roughly west to east except where it detours around towns and villages, and never crosses the A149 coast road. It has an area of 7,700 ha (19,027 acres), and is additionally protected through Natura 2000, Special Protection Area (SPA) and Ramsar listings; it is also part of the Norfolk Coast Area of Outstanding Natural Beauty (AONB). Scolt Head Island and the coast from the Holkham National Nature Reserve to Salthouse are a Biosphere Reserve.

The North Norfolk Coast SSSI contains a variety of habitats including foreshore, shingle, salt marshes, reed bed and pasture, and is important primarily for the breeding populations of nationally and internationally scarce bird species, and also the large numbers of wildfowl it supports in winter. More than three-quarters of the SSSI has been acquired as nature reserves by conservation organisations, whose properties also hold several rare or endangered invertebrates and plants. The mixed pattern of ownership of the ten reserves existing in 2012 reflects the availability of land for purchase or management over the preceding century, and the differing priorities of the various bodies.

== Overview ==
The North Norfolk Coast SSSI was created in 1986 from preexisting SSSIs at Blakeney Point, Holme Dunes, Cley Marshes, Salthouse Marshes (all designated in 1954), Morston Saltmarshes, Brancaster Manor (1968), Stiffkey Saltmarshes (1969), Thornham Marshes (1972) and Titchwell Marsh (1973), together with the national nature reserves (NNRs) at Scolt Head Island and Holkham, and substantial formerly undesignated areas. It has a wide variety of habitats. Bare mud, sand and shingle characterise the intertidal zone along the whole of the coast, although higher areas may have algae or eelgrass that are grazed by ducks and geese in winter. The salt marshes which form on sheltered parts of the coast, in the lee of islands, or behind spits are described in the SSSI notification document as "among the best in Europe ... flora is exceptionally diverse". Sand dunes occur at several places along the coast, but the best examples are at Holme Dunes, Holkham, Blakeney Point, and Scolt Head Island. The latter two sites are also important for geomorphology research purposes as structures consisting mainly of shingle ridges. Reed beds are fairly localised, but substantial areas occur at Titchwell Marsh, Brancaster and Cley Marshes. Grassland is represented by livestock grazing pasture reclaimed from former salt marsh, with wetter areas at Cley and Salthouse marshes. Woodland is limited in the SSSI, although a belt of Corsican pine planted at Holkham has provided shelter to allow other trees and shrubs to become established.

The SSSI is designated as a Special Protection Area for birds because its variety of coastal habitats give it year-round importance for a number of species. The breeding colonies of Sandwich terns and little terns, especially those at Blakeney and Scolt Head Island, are of European importance, and the coast is of national significance for common terns, pied avocets and reed bed specialists like western marsh harriers, Eurasian bitterns and bearded reedlings. The SSSI also holds large numbers of wintering ducks and geese, the endangered water vole, and scarce species like natterjack toad, starlet sea anemone, lesser centaury, sea barley and bee orchid.

Because of the wildlife importance of the area, much of what is now the SSSI has been protected in nature reserves, starting in 1912 when Charles Rothschild bought Blakeney Point and donated it to the National Trust, which has managed it since. A 2005 survey at six North Norfolk coastal sites (Snettisham, Titchwell, Holkham, Morston Quay, Blakeney and Cley) found that 39 per cent of visitors gave birdwatching as the main purpose of their visit. The 7.7 million day visitors and 5.5 million who made overnight stays in the area in 1999 are estimated to have spent £122 million, and created the equivalent of 2,325 full-time jobs. Titchwell Marsh (Royal Society for the Protection of Birds), Cley Marshes (Norfolk Wildlife Trust) and Holkham National Nature Reserve each attract 100,000 or more visitors annually. The SSSI ownership outside the listed areas is a mixture of private land and areas owned by the National Trust or wildfowling associations which are not actively managed as nature reserves.

== Reserves ==
The ten reserves existing in 2012 had a combined area of 6,016 ha (14,863 acres), 78 percent of the SSSI. Although they have no legal protection beyond that of privately owned land, they may have more active management or provide visitor facilities. The mixed ownership reflects land becoming available for purchase or management at various times, and the differing priorities of the conservation bodies.

Nature reserves in the North Norfolk Coast Site of Special Scientific Interest
| Reserve name | Management | Area | Date | Remarks | Grid ref.^{[A]} |
|---|---|---|---|---|---|
| Blakeney Point | National Trust | 1,097 ha (2,710 acres) | 1912 | A national nature reserve. A 3-mile-long sand and shingle spit that the sea is slowly moving landwards. | TG047452 |
| Cley Marshes | Norfolk Wildlife Trust | 176 ha (435 acres) | 1926 | Visitor centre and bird hides. Arnold's Marsh in the northeast corner of the reserve is owned by the National Trust. In 2012 the NWT launched a public appeal to raise £1 million to purchase 58 hectares (143 acres) of private land immediately to the east of the existing reserve, and also adjoining the existing NWT reserve at Salthouse Marshes. | TG054440 |
| Holkham National Nature Reserve | Natural England and the Holkham Estate | 3,531 ha (8,725 acres) | 1967 | Owned by the Earl of Leicester's Holkham Estate and the Crown Estates. Foreshore, sand dunes and sandspits, salt marsh, pine trees, shrub and grazing pasture. Two bird hides. | TF891440; TF912454 |
| Holme Bird Observatory | Norfolk Ornithological Association | 5 ha (13 acres) | 1962 | A bird ringing site for studying migration. Mainly scrubby dunes and pine trees. | TF714448 |
| Holme Dunes | Norfolk Wildlife Trust | 213 ha (526 acres) | 1965 | Also a national nature reserve. Sand dunes, grazing marsh, salt marsh and freshwater pools. Natural habitats maintained largely by coastal processes. | TF714449 |
| Kelling Quags | Norfolk Ornithological Association | 5.7 ha (14 acres) | 1984 | Pools and wet grazing meadows behind a shingle ridge. | TG093437 |
| Salthouse Marshes | Norfolk Wildlife Trust | 66 ha (163 acres) | 1971 | Pools and wet grazing meadows behind a shingle ridge. | TG071445 |
| Scolt Head Island | Natural England | 737 ha (1,821 acres) | 1968 | Owned jointly by The National Trust and Norfolk Wildlife Trust. Island with sand dunes, salt marsh, shingle and tidal sand and mud flats, largely non-interventionist management. | TF846457 |
| Stiffkey Fen | Buxton Conservation Trust | 14 ha (35 acres) | 1999 | Reed bed and a fresh water lagoon with islands. Donated to the Trust by Lord Buxton. | TF986436 |
| Titchwell Marsh | Royal Society for the Protection of Birds | 171 ha (420 acres) | 1973 | Reed bed, freshwater lagoon, tidal lagoon and dunes. Visitor centre and bird hides. | TF750437 |

== Notes ==
^{A} The grid reference is based on the British national grid reference system, and is the system used by the Ordnance Survey. Data is given for the main access point. Holkham National Nature Reserve has two road accesses.

== Cited texts ==
- Allen, J R L; Pye, K (1992). Saltmarshes; morphodynamics, conservation and engineering significance. Cambridge: Cambridge University Press. ISBN 9780521418416.
- Hammomd, Nicholas, ed. (1984). RSPB nature reserves. Sandy, Beds: RSPB. ISBN 0-903138-12-3.
- Harrup, Simon; Redman, Nigel (2010). Where to watch birds in Britain. London: Christopher Helm. ISBN 978-1-4081-1059-1.
- Liley, D (2008). Development and the north Norfolk coast. Scoping document on the issues relating to access (PDF). Wareham, Dorset: Footprint Ecology. Archived from the original (PDF) on 2012-08-31.
- Natural England (2009). Holkham National Nature Reserve. Sheffield: Natural England. Catalogue Code: NE167. (automatic download). ISBN 978-1-84754-133-X
- Norfolk Wildlife Trust (2005). NWT Cley and Salthouse Marshes Management Plan April 2005–March 2010. Norwich: Norfolk Wildlife Trust.
- Rowley, Trevor (2006). The English Landscape in the Twentieth Century. London: Hambledon Continuum. ISBN 1852853883.
- Ryan, Peter (1969). The National Trust and the National Trust for Scotland. London: J M Dent. ISBN 9780460038690.
- Turner, R K; Bateman, I J; Adger W N (2001). Economics of Coastal and Water Resources: Valuing Environmental Functions (Studies in Ecological Economics). London: Springer. ISBN 0-7923-6504-6.
