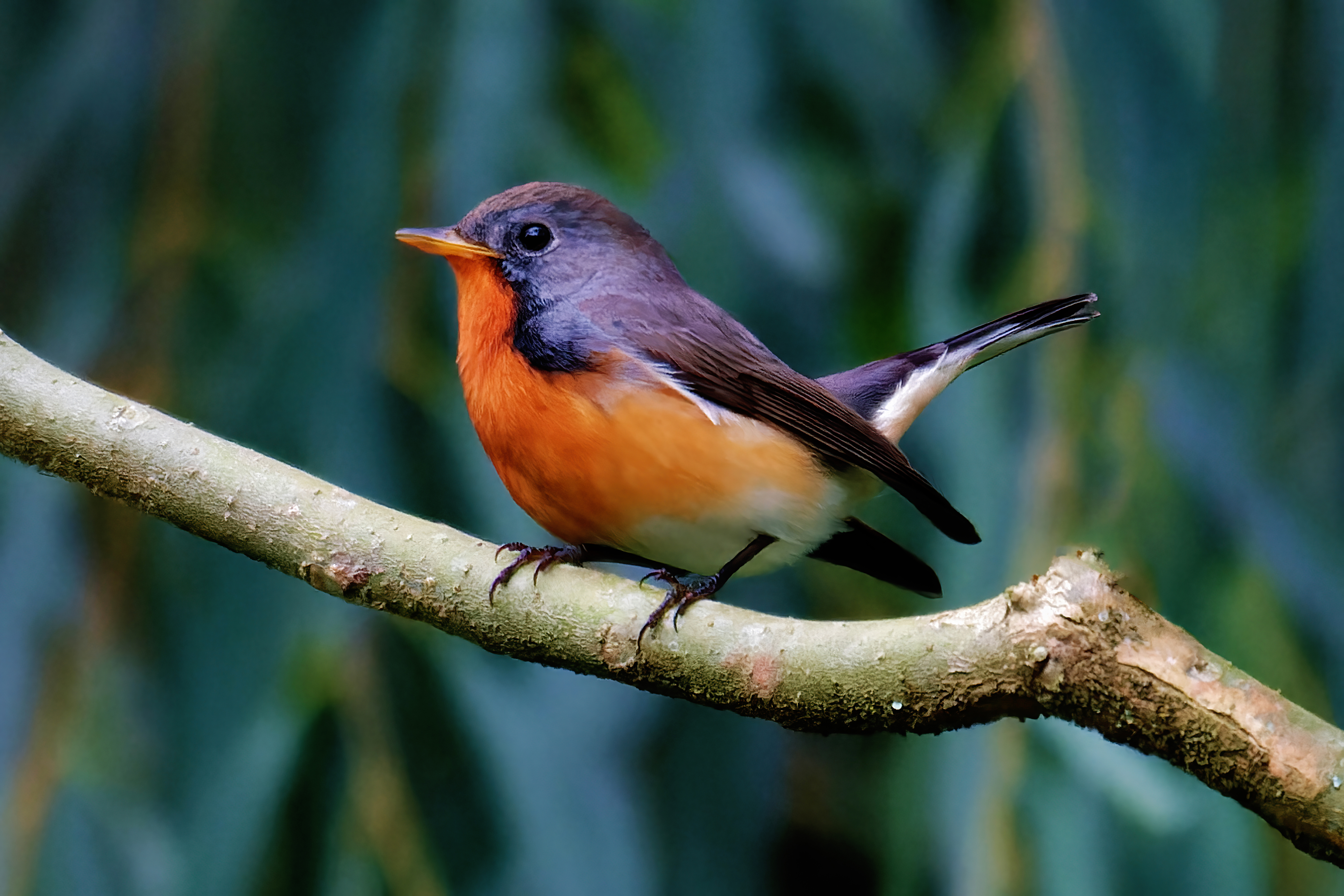

Conservation status
- Vulnerable (IUCN 3.1)

Scientific classification
- Kingdom: Animalia
- Phylum: Chordata
- Class: Aves
- Order: Passeriformes
- Family: Muscicapidae
- Genus: Ficedula
- Species: F. subrubra

Binomial name
- Ficedula subrubra (Hartert & Steinbacher, 1934)

= Kashmir flycatcher =

Species of bird

The Kashmir flycatcher (Ficedula subrubra) is a small passerine bird in the flycatcher family Muscicapidae. It breeds in the Northwest Himalayas and winters in southern India and Sri Lanka. It was formerly considered to be a subspecies of the red-breasted flycatcher, Ficedula parva, which is its closest living relative. Males are distinctive in having a blackish border to the reddish throat while the females can easily be confused with those of F. parva.

== Description ==
The Kashmir flycatcher is 13 cm long, an insectivorous species closely related to the red-breasted flycatcher and sharing the habits of flicking its tail up while perching. The male has a grey-brown back with an orange-red throat, breast and flanks, bordered with black on the throat and breast. Females and first-winter birds have slightly browner upperparts, and the red of the underparts may be reduced to just a pinkish wash. The females have the tail darker than the back with white on the lower basal half of the outer feathers. The male of the similar taiga flycatcher, Ficedula albicilla, has the reddish-orange area limited to the throat and the top of the breast, and lacks the black border.

It breeds in the north-west Himalayas in the Kashmir region of the Indian subcontinent. It is migratory and winters in the hills of central Sri Lanka, the Nilgiris, and the Western Ghats of India.

The Kashmir flycatcher breeds in forests at 1800–2400 m in the Himalayas, often in mixed broad leaved forest with Perrottetia and Corylus. It nests in May and June in a hole in a tree under a metre above the ground. The nest is lined with moss, bark and hair. The eggs, 3-5 of which are laid are pale green and speckled in reddish brown, more densely at the broad end. They are incubated by the female.

Most individuals leave the breeding grounds in September, arriving in Sri Lanka in October and departing again in late March. One of the best places to see this rare species is Victoria Park in Nuwara Eliya.

The song is a short melodic sweet-eet sweet-eet-did-he, and the calls include a sharp chak and a harsh rattling trrr accompanied by wing flicking and tail movement.

This is a vulnerable species with a decreasing population and breeding range, which is also severely fragmented as a result of the destruction of temperate mixed deciduous forests by commercial timber extraction, agriculture and livestock grazing. The population is thought to be between 2,500 and 10,000 birds.

== Gallery ==
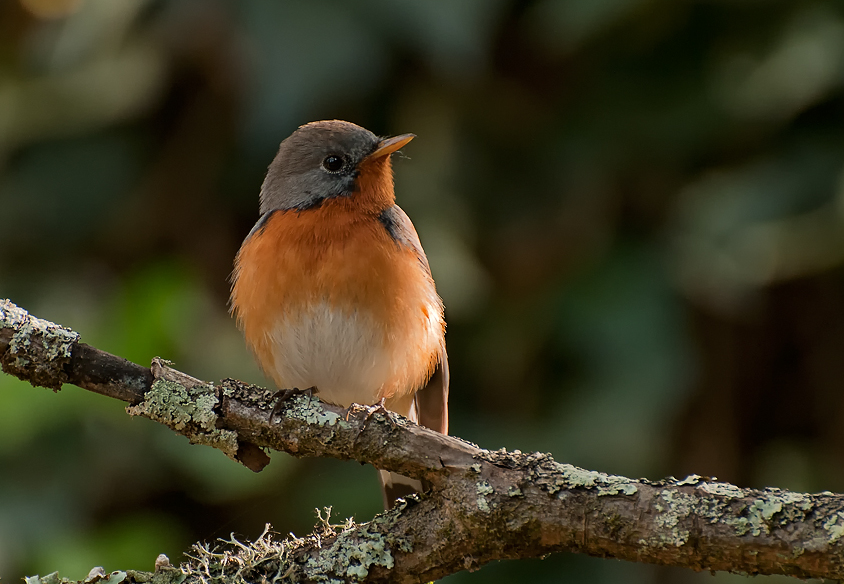
Kashmir flycatcher wintering in Ooty

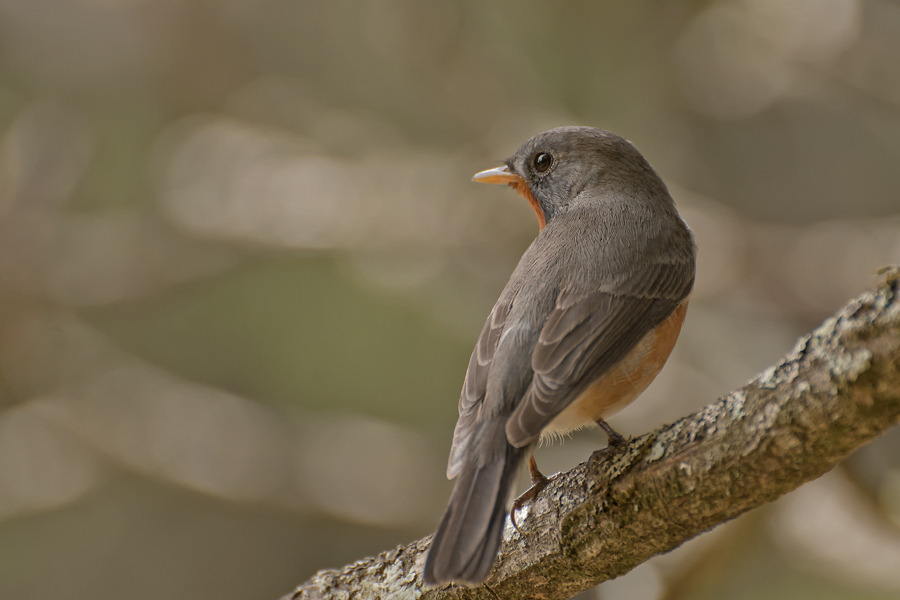
Kashmir flycatcher in Ooty
