= Holkham Camp =

Archaeological site in Norfolk, England

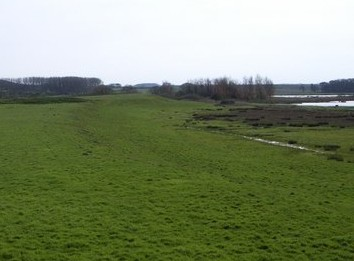
- The fort, seen from the Joe Jordan bird hide to the north, is in the distance beyond the raised track

- Location within Norfolk
- 52°58′2″N 0°47′29″E
- Type: Iron Age fort
- Periods: Mesolithic, Neolithic, Iron Age
- Cultures: Iceni
- Location: Near Holkham, Norfolk
- OS grid reference: TF 875 447

Site notes
- Area: 2.5 hectares (6.2 acres)

Scheduled monument
- Designated: 4 December 1924
- Reference no.: 1018014

Holkham Camp, or Holkham Fort, is an Iron Age fort in Norfolk, England, about 1 mile (1.6 km) north-west of the village of Holkham. It is a scheduled monument.

== Location and description ==
It is in the Holkham National Nature Reserve, at the southern end of a sandy spit, with coastal dunes to the north and tidal wetlands on the other sides. The site is not normally accessible on foot; it can be seen from an elevated bird hide on the edge of woods to the north.

It is near two other Iron Age enclosures: about 5.5 miles (8.9 km) north of Bloodgate Hill Iron Age Fort, and about 5 miles (8.0 km) northwest of Warham Camp.

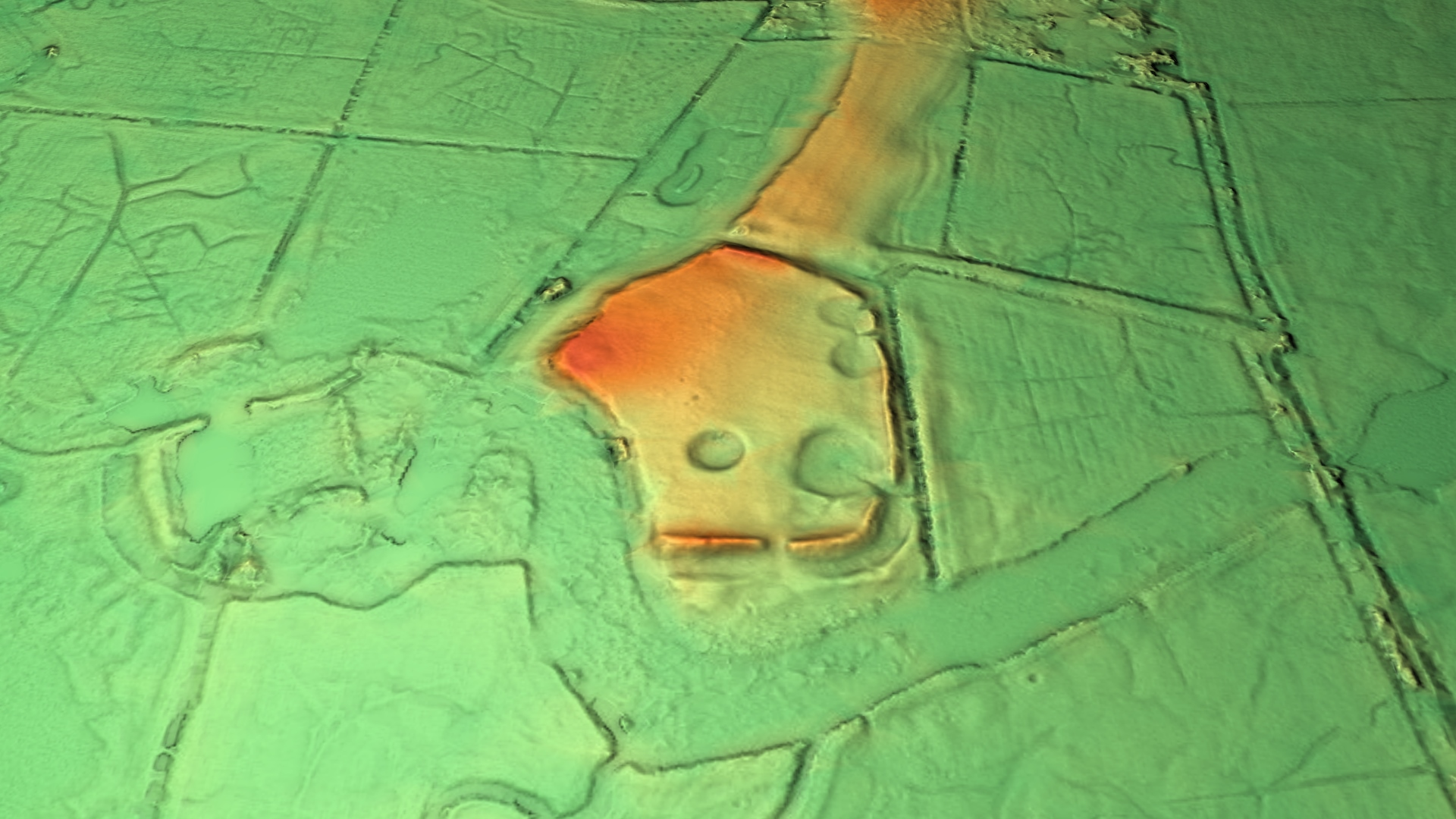
3D view of the digital terrain model

It is an oval enclosure, area about 2.5 hectares (6.2 acres). The western side is protected by a slope, and by a creek on the south-west. The eastern side has a single rampart and ditch, with an additional outer bank at the south-east. There is a gap in the banks about 9 metres (30 ft) wide on the south side, thought to be the location of the original entrance.

== History ==
During the Iron Age and Roman era, the site was in the area of the Iceni tribe. Holkham Camp is one of two possible sites (the other being Stonea Camp in the Cambridgeshire fens) corresponding to the description by the Roman historian Tacitus of the location of the defeat in AD 47 of Iceni rebels by a Roman force commanded by Ostorius Scapula.

The site may have been a feature in Mesolithic and Neolithic times, since finds include worked flints from these periods; they are thought to have been in their original location, as the site has not been ploughed.

== See also ==
- Hillforts in Britain
