= Holkham National Nature Reserve =

Nature reserve in the United Kingdom

Holkham
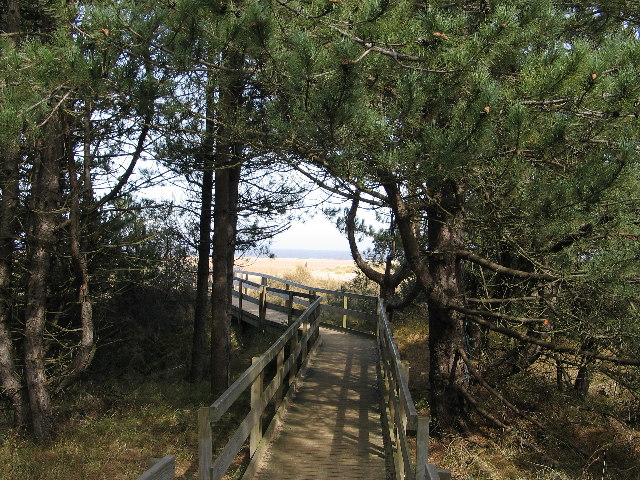
- Beach viewed from board-walk through the pines

- Location within Norfolk
- Location: Norfolk, East of England, England
- Coordinates: 52.969°N 0.813°E

Holkham National Nature Reserve is one of England's largest national nature reserve (NNR). It is on the Norfolk coast between Burnham Overy Staithe and Blakeney, and is managed by Natural England with the cooperation of the Holkham Estate. Its 3,900 hectares (9,600 acres) comprise a wide range of habitats, including grazing marsh, woodland, salt marsh, sand dunes and foreshore. The reserve is part of the North Norfolk Coast Site of Special Scientific Interest, and the larger area is additionally protected through Natura 2000, Special Protection Area (SPA) and Ramsar listings, and is part of both an Area of Outstanding Natural Beauty (AONB) and a World Biosphere Reserve. Holkham NNR is important for its wintering wildfowl, especially pink-footed geese, Eurasian wigeon and brant geese, but it also has breeding waders, and attracts many migrating birds in autumn. Many scarce invertebrates and plants can be found in the dunes, and the reserve is one of the only two sites in the UK to have an antlion colony.

This stretch of coast originally consisted of salt marshes protected from the sea by ridges of shingle and sand, and Holkham's Iron Age fort stood at the end of a sandy spit surrounded by the tidal wetland. The Vikings navigated the creeks to establish Holkham village, but access to the former harbour was stopped by drainage and reclamation of the marshes between the coast and the shingle ridge which started in the 17th century, and was completed in 1859. The Holkham estate has been owned by the Coke family, later Earls of Leicester since 1609, and their seat at Holkham Hall is opposite the reserve's Lady Anne's Drive entrance. The 3rd Earl planted pines on the dunes to protect the pastures reclaimed by his predecessors from wind-blown sand. The national nature reserve was created in 1967 from 1,700 hectares (4,200 acres) of the Holkham Estate and 2,200 hectares (5,400 acres) of foreshore belonging to the Crown.

The reserve has over 100,000 visitors a year, including birdwatchers and horse riders, and is therefore significant for the local economy. The NNR has taken steps to control entry to the fragile dunes and other areas important for their animals or plants because of the damage to sensitive habitats that could be caused by unrestricted access. The dunes are an essential natural defence against the projected rises in sea level along this vulnerable coast.

== Description ==
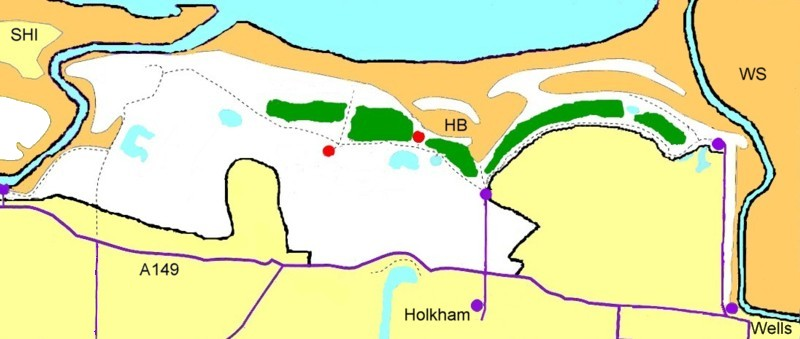
Publicly accessible part of the NNR: Pasture and dunes; Pines; Tidal foreshore and salt marsh; Roads and car parks; Bird hides; SHI: Scolt Head Island NNR; HB: Holkham Bay; WS: Wells salt marshes (part of Holkham NNR)

The reserve lies to the north of the A149 coast road, starting just west of Burnham Overy Staithe and extending west past Holkham to Beach Road, Wells-next-the-Sea. It also includes the tidal salt marshes continuing further east to Blakeney. Its total area of about 3,900 hectares (9,600 acres) makes it the largest NNR in England. The reserve can be accessed by footpaths from Wells and the local villages including the Peddars Way/Norfolk Coast long-distance trail that traverses the main part of the reserve, and National Cycle Route 1 loops through the core of the NNR between Holkham and Wells. There is a car park near Holkham village at the north end of Lady Anne's Drive that gives access to two bird hides, and another parking area at the end of Beach Road in Wells. To the east of the Wells Channel, the reserve is mainly salt marshes and mud flats, and is difficult and potentially dangerous to access, although a public footpath runs along the southern edge of these tidal areas.

The salt marshes on this coast are stated in the Site of Special Scientific Interest (SSSI) notification document to be "among the best in Europe ... the flora is exceptionally diverse". Holkham also has good examples of sand dunes, and the pines planted on the dunes have provided shelter for other trees and shrubs to become established, making this the only substantial area of woodland in the North Norfolk Coast SSSI. The dunes are created and altered by the elements, and the sand islands in Holkham Bay have formed only within the last 60 years. The flat ground inland from the dunes is a reclaimed salt marsh that was used as pasture until the 1940s, but converted to arable land during World War II. The value of the fields to wildlife was reduced by the resulting lower water table, but Natural England's management measures have raised the water levels, attracting breeding and wintering birds. Water management can also be used to ensure a high water table in summer, benefiting breeding waders, and drier conditions in winter, preferred by the geese. The management of water levels and grassland increased the number of breeding wetland birds from 120 pairs of ten species in 1986 to 795 pairs of 26 species in 1994, and the number of wintering birds of four key wildfowl species rose from 1,215 to 17,305 in the decade from 1983/84.

== History ==
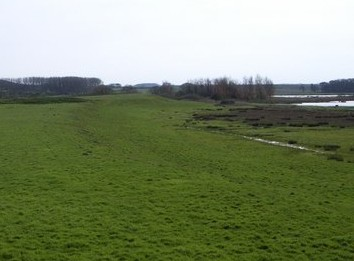
The mound of Holkham fort is visible at the end of the raised track, formerly its only access.

Norfolk has a long history of human occupation. Both modern and Neanderthal people were present in the area between 100,000 and 10,000 years ago, before the last glaciation, and humans returned as the ice retreated northwards. The archaeological record is poor until about 20,000 years ago, partly because of the then prevailing very cold conditions, but also because the coastline was much further north than at present. As the ice retreated during the Mesolithic (10,000–5,000 BCE), the sea level rose, filling what is now the North Sea. This brought the Norfolk coastline much closer to its present line, so that many ancient sites are now under the sea in an area now known as Doggerland.

The coast at Holkham originally consisted of salt marshes protected from the sea by ridges of shingle and sand. A large Iron Age fort (Holkham Camp) at the end of a sandy spit in the marshes could only be approached along the spit; it enclosed 2.5 hectares (6.2 acres) and remained in use until the defeat of the Iceni in 47 AD. The Vikings navigated the tidal creeks to establish Holkham, the name deriving from the Danish for "ship town".

The Holkham Estate has been owned by the Coke family since 1609, and Holkham Hall, built by Thomas Coke, 1st Earl of Leicester between 1734 and 1764, is opposite the NNR entrance. Until the 17th century, ships could navigate the tidal creeks to reach the staithe (harbour) at Holkham village, but local landowners began to reclaim the marshes from 1639, and the final embankment at Wells was constructed by the 2nd Earl in 1859, completing the conversion of about 800 hectares (2,000 acres) to farmland. The 3rd Earl planted Corsican, maritime and Scots pines on the dunes in the late 19th century to shelter the agricultural land from wind-blown sand, which is carried inland when the wind speed exceeds three metres per second (9.8 ft/s) and blows from directions between northwest to northeast.

The Holkham National Nature Reserve was created in 1967 from 1,700 hectares (4,200 acres) of the Holkham Estate and 2,200 hectares (5,400 acres) of intertidal sand and mud flats belonging to the Crown Estate. In 1986 the NNR was subsumed into the newly created 7,700 hectares (19,000 acres) North Norfolk Coast SSSI. The larger area is now additionally protected through Natura 2000, Special Protection Area (SPA) and Ramsar listings, and is part of the Norfolk Coast Area of Outstanding Natural Beauty. The coast from Holkham NNR to Salthouse, together with Scolt Head Island, is a Biosphere Reserve.

== Flora and fauna ==
=== Birds ===
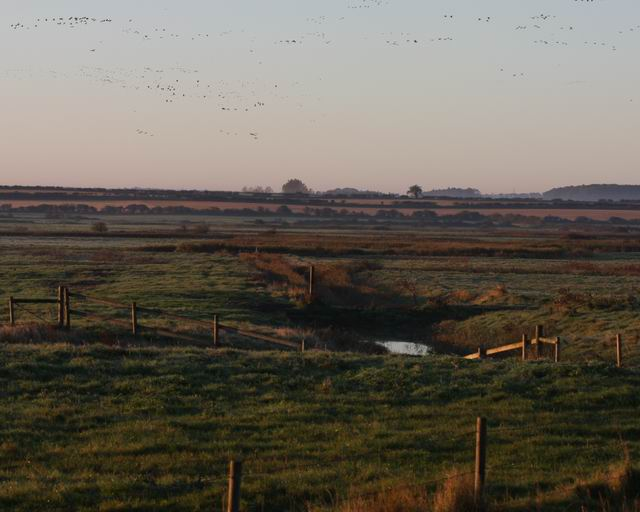
Pink-footed geese leaving the grazing marshes at dawn

As many as 50,000 pink-footed geese, 13,000 Eurasian wigeon and 7,000 Brent geese winter at Holkham, making it of international importance for these species. Up to 400 white-fronted geese and a few tundra bean geese may join the wildfowl flocks, and the odd peregrine falcon, short-eared owl, merlin, marsh harrier or hen harrier may hunt over the fields. The shingle banks and foreshore hold wintering flocks of shore larks, snow buntings and twite, and waders like knots, curlews, dunlins and grey plover probe for invertebrates in the mud flats.

Spring migration is relatively quiet, although sightings of ring ouzel and firecrest are possible amongst the more common arrivals. Breeding birds include lapwings, common snipe, pied avocets, common redshanks and marsh harriers on the grazing marshes, ringed plovers and little terns on the beach, and black-headed, herring and lesser black-backed gulls on the salt marsh. The small grey heron colony has been joined by little egrets, and, from 2010, by Eurasian spoonbills. In 2020, a pair of cattle egrets successfully bred at the site, the first time the species had successfully bred in Norfolk. The pines may occasionally have nesting siskins or common crossbills, and parrot crossbills bred in 1984 and 1985.

Holkham's north-facing coastal location can attract large numbers of migrating birds in autumn if the weather conditions are right, especially with north to north-east wind. The common species may be accompanied by a wryneck, red-backed shrike or greenish warbler in August, with goldcrests, thrushes and finches later in the season, and perhaps red-breasted flycatchers and yellow-browed warblers. Vagrant rarities such as Pallas's, Radde's or dusky warblers may occur; a red-breasted nuthatch in 1989 was the first, and, as of 2019, the only individual of its species to be recorded in the UK.

=== Other animals and plants ===
Brown hares and European otters are found all along the north Norfolk coast, but red squirrels disappeared from the Holkham pines by 1981. The rare natterjack toad breeds at Holkham, one of only two sites along this coast, although the common frog, common toad and common lizard are widespread in appropriate habitats.

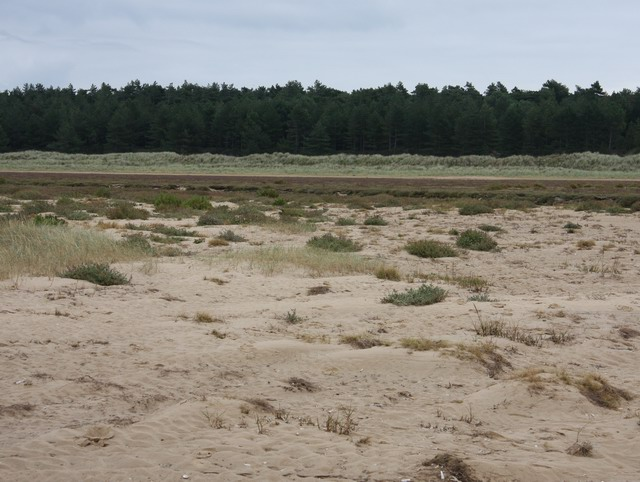
The pines and salt marsh protect and stabilise the dunes.

The green hairstreak, purple hairstreak, comma, hummingbird hawk-moth, broad-bordered bee hawk-moth and ghost moth are sometimes seen in the woods with the common butterfly and moth species, and a clouded yellow or Camberwell beauty may also occur in some years. Grayling, small heath and common blue butterflies can be found in the dunes, where there is also a large antlion colony, making Holkham one of only two locations for this predatory insect in the UK. Dragonflies include the migrant hawker, southern hawker and ruddy darter.

On exposed parts of the coast, the mud and sands are scoured by the tides, and have no vegetation except possibly algae or eelgrass, but where the shoreline is more protected, internationally important salt marshes can form, with several uncommon species. The salt marsh contains glassworts and annual seablite in the most exposed regions, with a succession of plants following on as the marsh becomes more established: first sea aster, then mainly sea lavender, with sea purslane in the creeks and smaller areas of sea plantain and other common marsh plants. Scrubby sea-blite and matted sea lavender are characteristic plants of the drier upper salt marsh here, although they are uncommon in the UK away from the Norfolk coast.

Grasses such as sea couch grass and sea poa grass are important in the driest areas of the marshes, and on the coastal dunes, where marram grass, sand couch-grass, lyme-grass and red fescue help to bind the sand. Sea holly and sand sedge are other specialists of this arid habitat, and petalwort is a nationally rare bryophyte found on damper dunes. Bird's-foot trefoil, pyramidal orchid, bee orchid, lesser centaury and carline thistle flower on the more stable dunes, where the rare Jersey cudweed and grey hair-grass are also found. The narrow 5 km (3.1 mi) belt of pines shelters creeping lady's tresses and yellow bird's nest.

== Recreation ==
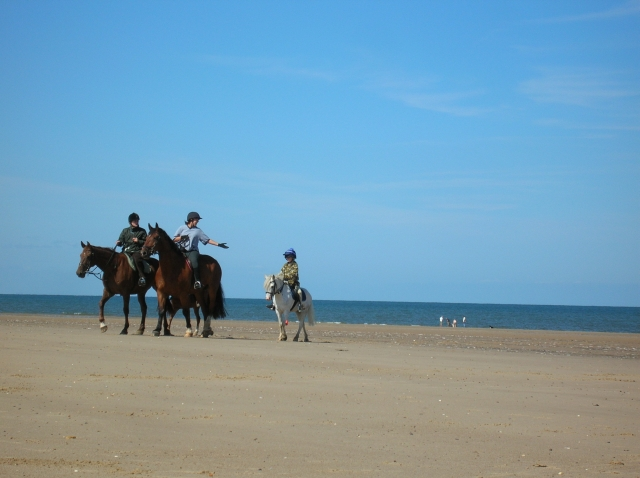
The reserve has many visitors every year, including horse riders on the beach.

A 2005 survey at Holkham and five other North Norfolk coastal sites found that 39 per cent of visitors gave birdwatching as the main purpose of their visit. The 7.7 million day visitors and 5.5 million who made overnight stays in the area in 1999 are estimated to have spent £122 million, and created the equivalent of 2,325 full-time jobs. Holkham NNR is one of three sites within the SSSI that attract 100,000 or more visitors annually, the others being Titchwell Marsh and Cley Marshes. The large number of visitors at coastal sites sometimes has negative effects. Wildlife may be disturbed, a frequent difficulty for species that breed in exposed areas such as Ringed Plovers and Little Terns, and also for wintering geese. Plants can be trampled, which is a particular problem in sensitive habitats such as dunes and vegetated shingles. The discovery of the nationally rare tiny earthstar fungus at Holkham led its finders to state that "The survival of this species in Britain would undoubtedly benefit from the construction of a boardwalk across this fragile and frequently-visited habitat."

The Little Tern colony at Holkham, holding seven per cent of the British population, is cordoned off in the breeding season, with signs explaining why people are excluded from the area. The dune vegetation can be damaged by too many people walking over it, leading to blowout, and the rapid wind erosion of the sand. Boardwalks and steps enable visitors to reach the beach on foot without harming the dunes, and horse riders and naturists are asked to stay on the beach and keep off the dunes. As the climate becomes warmer in the future, there is likely to be more tourism pressure on the coasts, but the effects of this may be mitigated by a move towards lower-impact activities like bathing.

The Norfolk Coast Partnership, a grouping of conservation and environmental bodies, divides the coast and its hinterland into three zones for tourism development purposes. Holkham Dunes, along with Holme Dunes and Blakeney Point, were considered to be sensitive habitats already suffering from visitor pressure, and were designated as red-zone areas with no development or parking improvements to be recommended. The rest of the NNR is placed in the orange zone, for locations with fragile habitats but less tourism pressure.

== Threats ==
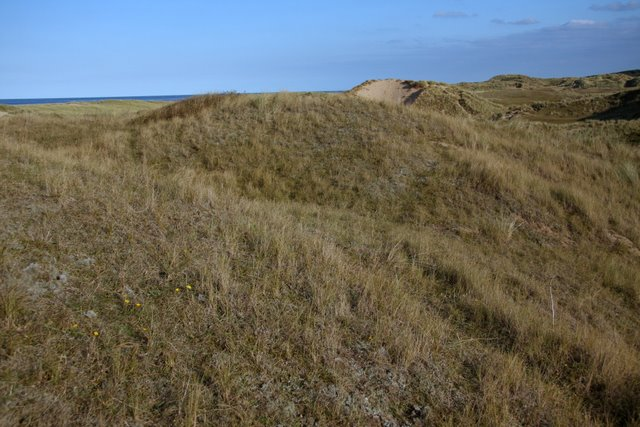
Vegetated dunes along the coast protect the reserve from flooding.

The underlying geology of the North Norfolk coast is Cretaceous chalk, exposed at Hunstanton cliffs just to the west of the SSSI, but buried by soft Quaternary glacial debris for the entire length of the SSSI coast. Unlike the soft, rapidly eroding cliffs further east, the coast of the SSSI has shown a less consistent pattern, with a net accretion of beach material between 1880 and 1950. However, this coastline is threatened by climate change, with the sea level rising an estimated 1–2 mm per year for the last 100 years, increasing the risk of flooding and coastal erosion.

Half the area of the salt marshes that formed in the lee of Scolt Head Island has been reclaimed in the last 300 years, creating ecologically important, but very fragile, grazing marshes. Although Holkham is low-lying and can flood in severe weather conditions, it is protected by the spit that developed at the Holkham Gap in the 1990s and the dunes along the coast, which are increasingly being stabilised by vegetation. The Environment Agency's management plan until 2105 is to rely on the natural protection of the dunes, intervening only if work is necessary to maintain their effectiveness in the face of a potential sea level rise of 1.1 metres (3.6 feet) by that date. The shingle that makes up Scolt Head Island is moving westwards and southwards at up to 3.5 metres (11 feet) per year. This may affect the movement of sediment, and lead to some erosion of the dunes and beaches at Holkham, but should not destroy their effectiveness as a sea defence unless the island reattaches to the mainland at some date in the distant future.

== Cited texts ==
- Allen, John R. L.; Pye, Kenneth (1992). Saltmarshes: Morphodynamics, Conservation, and Engineering Significance. Cambridge University Press. ISBN 978-0-521-41841-6.
- East Anglia Coastal Group (2010). North Norfolk shoreline management plan. Peterborough: Environment Agency.
- Elkins, Norman (1988). Weather and bird behaviour. Waterhouses, Staffordshire: Poyser. ISBN 0-85661-051-8.
- Harrup, Simon; Redman, Nigel (2010). Where to watch birds in Britain. London: Christopher Helm. ISBN 978-1-4081-1059-1.
- Liley, D. (2008). Development and the north Norfolk coast. Scoping document on the issues relating to access (PDF). Wareham, Dorset: Footprint Ecology. Archived from the original (PDF) on 31 August 2012.
- May, V. J., ed. (2003). Geological Conservation Review: volume 28: Coastal geomorphology of Great Britain. Peterborough: Joint Nature Conservation Committee. ISBN 1-86107-484-0.
- Natural England (2009). Holkham National Nature Reserve. Sheffield: Natural England. Catalogue Code: NE167. (automatic download).
- Newton, Ian (2010). Bird migration: Collins New Naturalist Library (113). London: Collins. ISBN 978-0-00-730732-6.
- Norfolk Wildlife Trust (2005). NWT Cley and Salthouse Marshes management plan April 2005–March 2010. Norwich: Norfolk Wildlife Trust.
- Robertson, David; Crawley, Peter; Barker, Adam; Whitmore, Sandrine (2005). Norfolk Archaeological Unit Report No. 1045: Norfolk rapid coastal zone archaeological survey (PDF). Norwich: Norfolk Archaeological Unit. Archived (PDF) from the original on 2 August 2011.
- Scott Wilson Ltd (2006). Tourism benefit and impacts analysis in the Norfolk coast Area of Outstanding Natural Beauty (PDF). Norwich: Norfolk Coast Partnership. Archived from the original (PDF) on 7 February 2016.
- Andrew Welch (17 September 2014). "Holkham beach - saved for Naturism by BN". British Naturism. Archived from the original on 12 October 2014.
