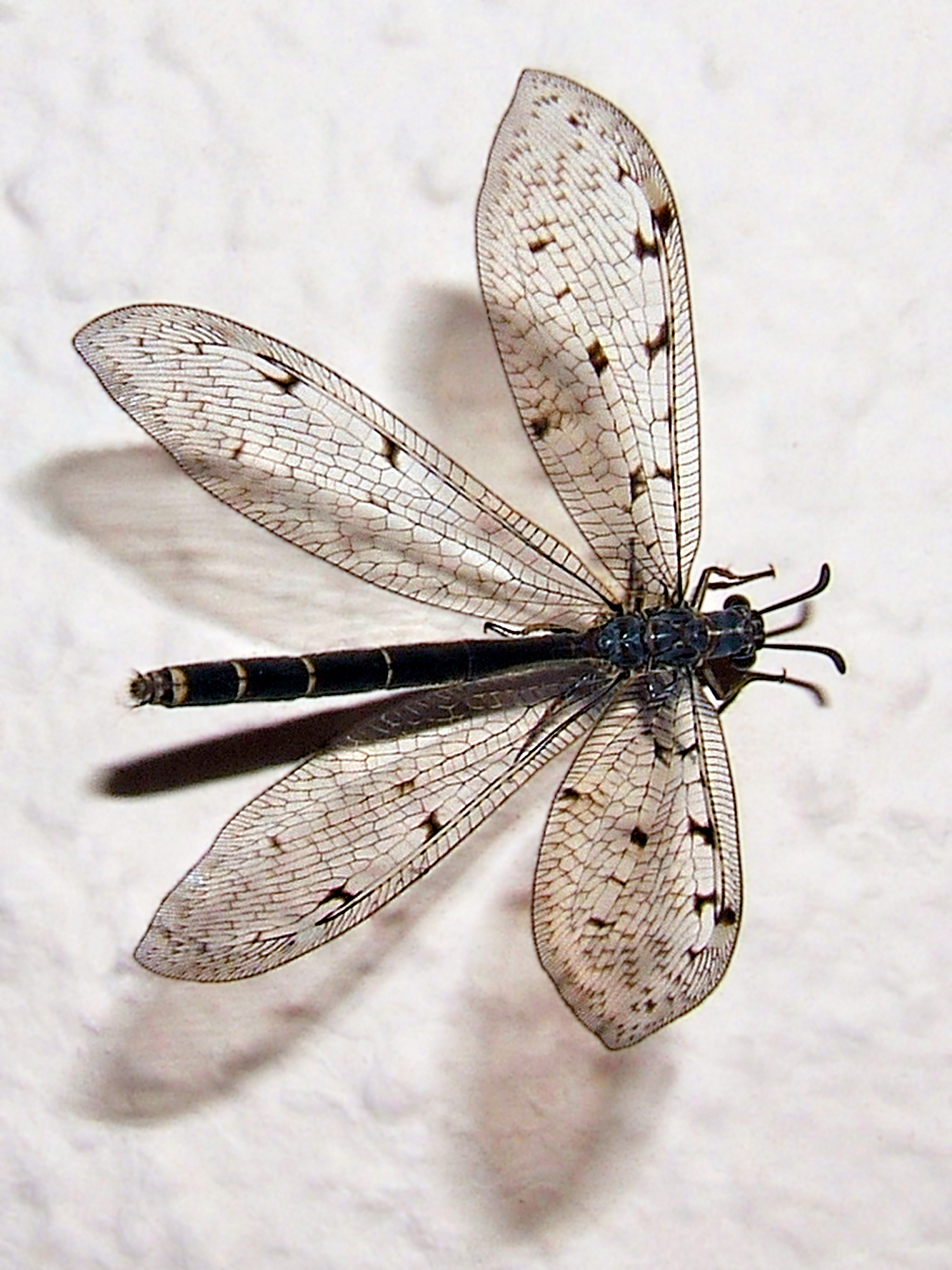
- Euroleon nostras

Scientific classification
- Domain: Eukaryota
- Kingdom: Animalia
- Phylum: Arthropoda
- Class: Insecta
- Order: Neuroptera
- Family: Myrmeleontidae
- Subfamily: Myrmeleontinae
- Tribe: Myrmeleontini
- Genus: Euroleon; Esben-Petersen, 1918

Species
- Euroleon coreanus; Euroleon flavicorpus; Euroleon nostras; Euroleon parvus; Euroleon polyspilus; Euroleon sanxianus; Euroleon sjostedti

= Euroleon =

Genus of insects

Euroleon is an antlion genus in the family Myrmeleontidae. The genus is European but is present in Sichuan, China.
