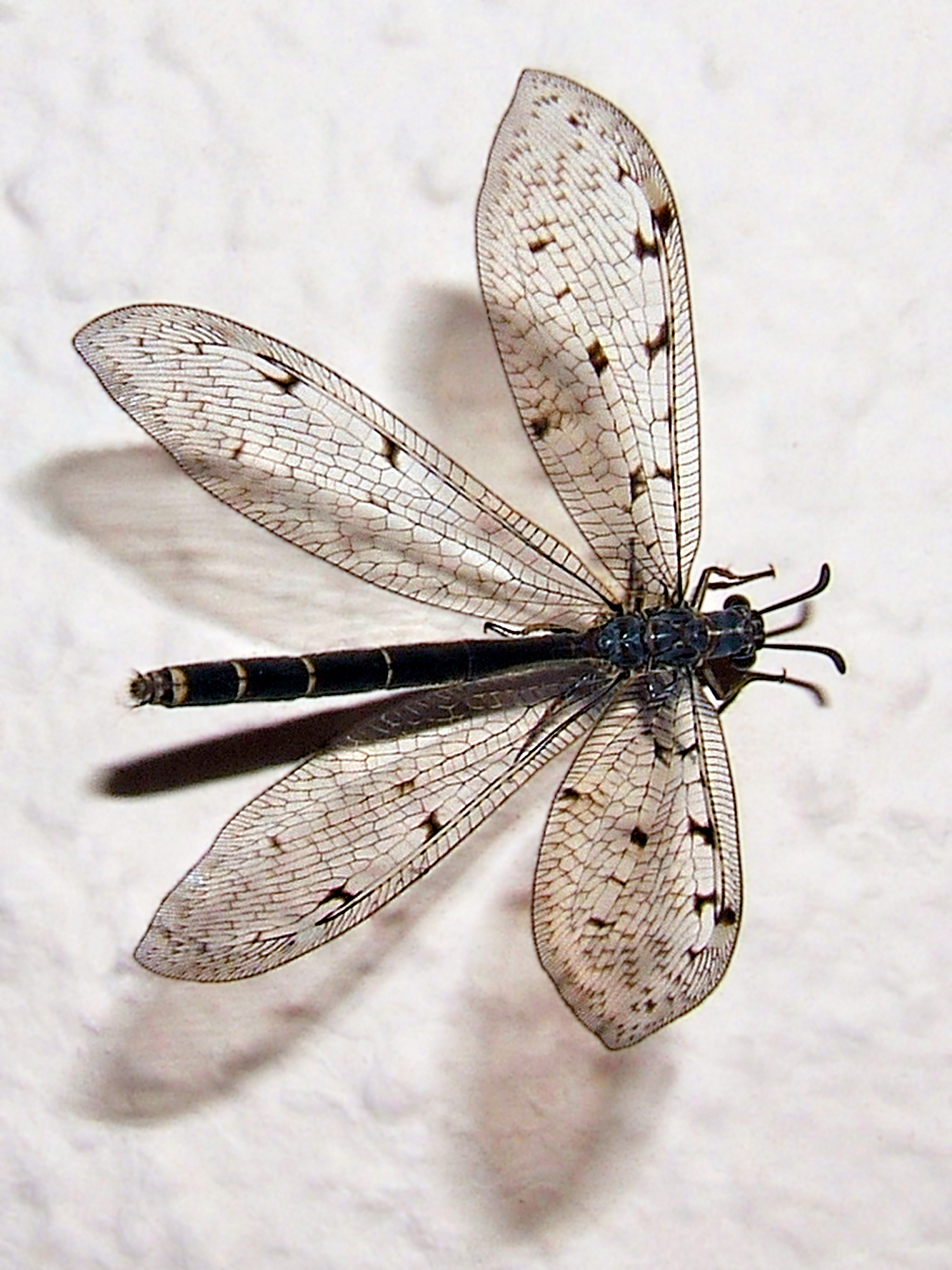

Scientific classification
- Kingdom: Animalia
- Phylum: Arthropoda
- Class: Insecta
- Order: Neuroptera
- Family: Myrmeleontidae
- Genus: Euroleon
- Species: E. nostras

Binomial name
- Euroleon nostras (Fourcroy, 1785)

= Euroleon nostras =

Species of insect

Euroleon nostras is a species of antlion found over most of Europe. The scientific name can be translated as "our European [ant] lion". Adults resemble dragonflies or damselflies and may reach up to 30 mm (1.2 in) long, with a wingspan of 70 mm (2.8 in). The larvae prey on ants and other small creatures and require dry sandy soil in which to dig their pitfall traps.

== Description ==
The larva of E. nostras has large jaws and a broad abdomen. When fully developed, which may take two years, it pupates under the soil, undergoes metamorphosis, emerging a month later as a much larger winged insect. The adult E. nostras is brown and resembles a dragonfly or damselfly in appearance. It is about 30 mm (1.2 in) long with a wingspan of about 70 mm (2.8 in). The four large translucent wings are spotted with brown.

== Distribution ==
Euroleon nostras has a widespread distribution in Europe, and has been recorded from almost all European countries, its range extending from Spain through Germany to western Russia. It is also known from Morocco in North Africa, and from Turkey, Armenia, Georgia and Azerbaijan in Asia. It is an extremely rare insect in Britain, known only from the Minsmere area of the Suffolk coast and Holkham National Nature Reserve in Norfolk.

== Behaviour ==
The larva of E. nostras excavates a conical pit-trap in sand or loose soil and then semi-buries itself at the bottom. It is able to detect the approach of potential prey by detecting vibrations in the ground. It can locate where the prey is at any given time and can flick loose sand with its head accurately towards it. Small arthropods that inadvertently enter the trap are unable to climb out because of the loose surface and are pounced on by the ant-lion larva, which then sucks out their body fluids before tossing out the dry husk. The larvae favoured locations with dry sand under a rock overhang or other surface that prevented direct rainfall. In a research study in Slovenia, the density of the pits varied from 44 to 543 pits per square metre. Later instar larvae required more space for their larger pits. In conditions of overcrowding, cannibalism took place. In an experiment where the larvae were stocked at 1000 per square metre, about half were killed and eaten by other larvae.

Adult E. nostras are on the wing from June to September but are seldom seen because they are nocturnal, hiding during the day in vegetation. The short adult life is devoted to reproduction. The female hangs on a twig when mating and the male attaches himself to her by his reproductive organs and dangles below for the hour or two that mating takes. After this, the female flies to the ground, tapping it with her abdomen to find a suitable spot, and inserting her ovipositor into the sand and laying an egg. She repeats these actions about twenty times. While on the ground, she is in danger from antlion larvae.

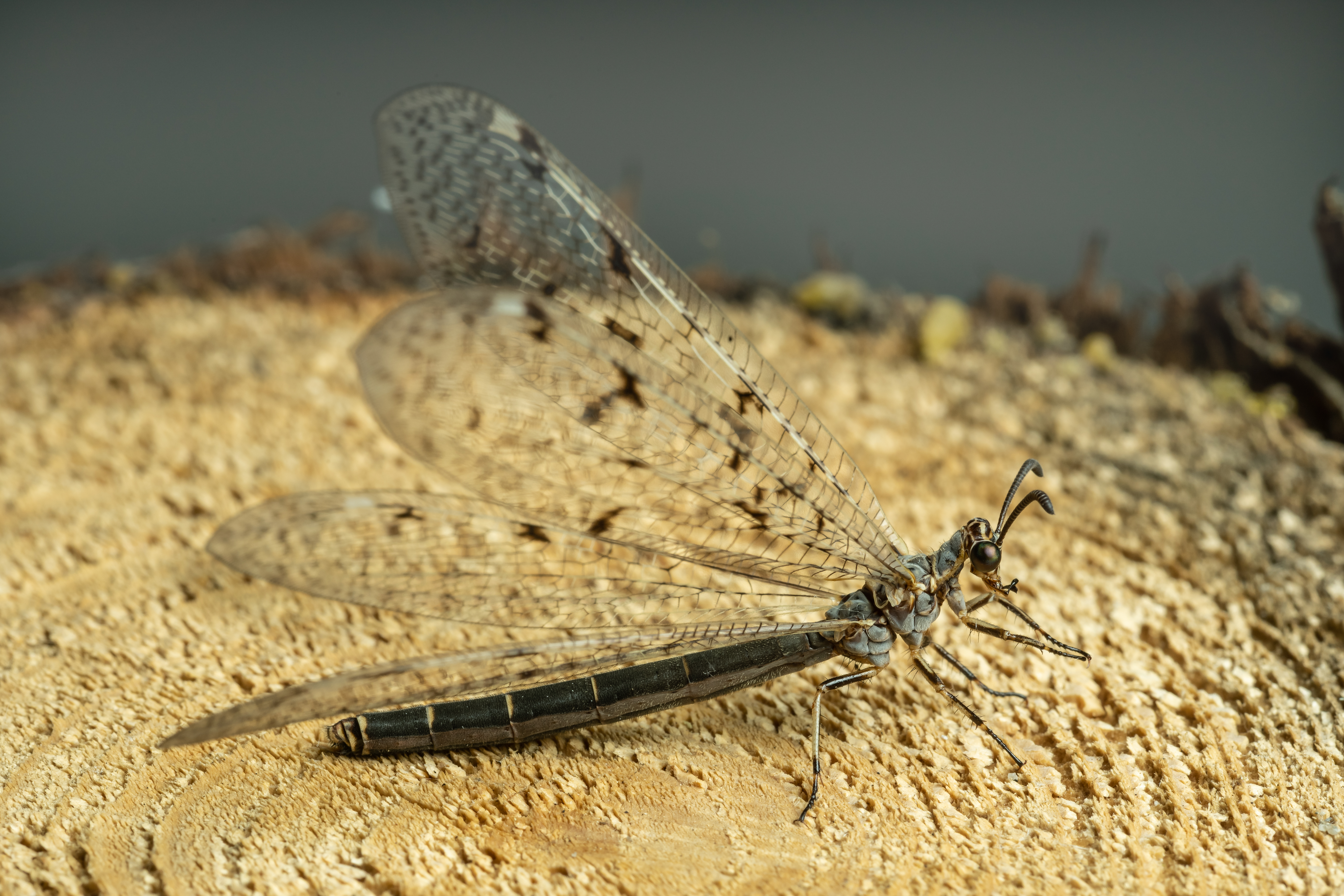
Lateral view

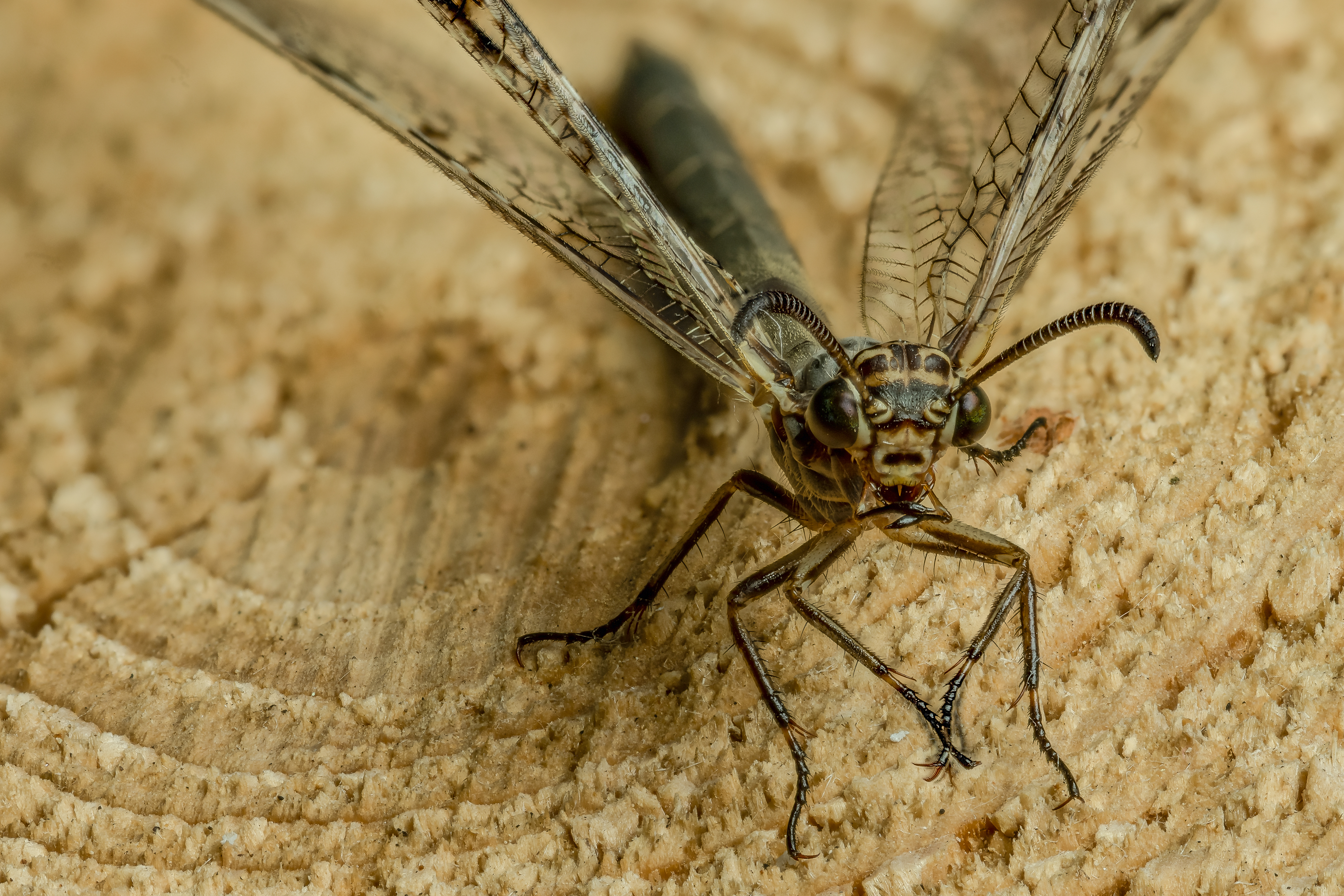
Frontal view

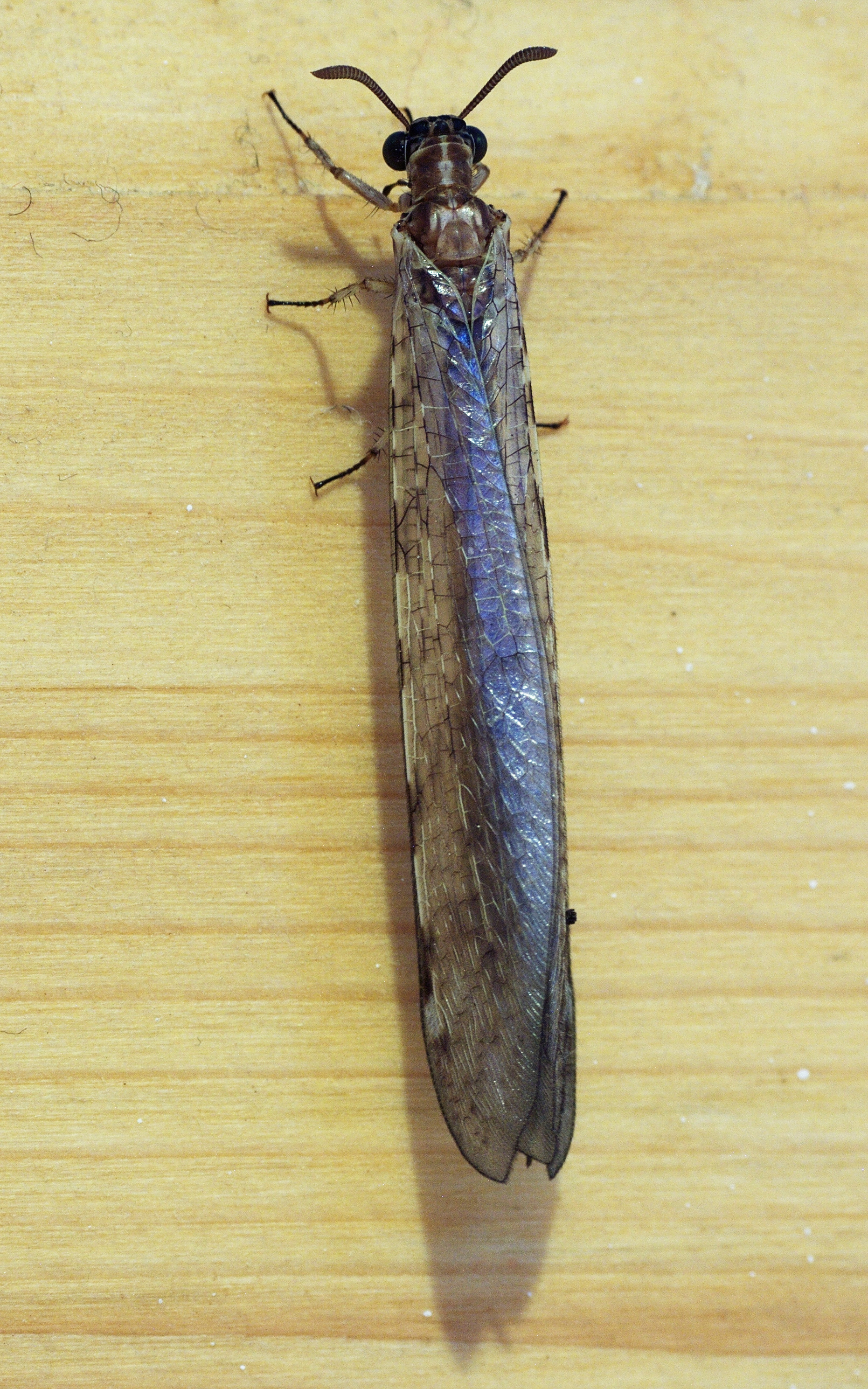
Resting wings posture

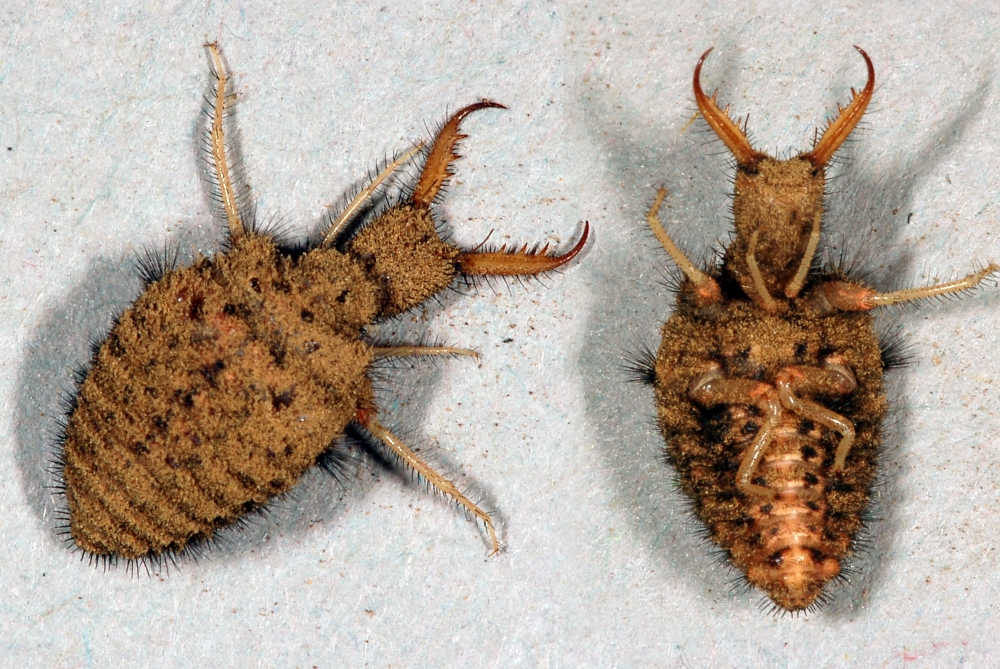
Larvae

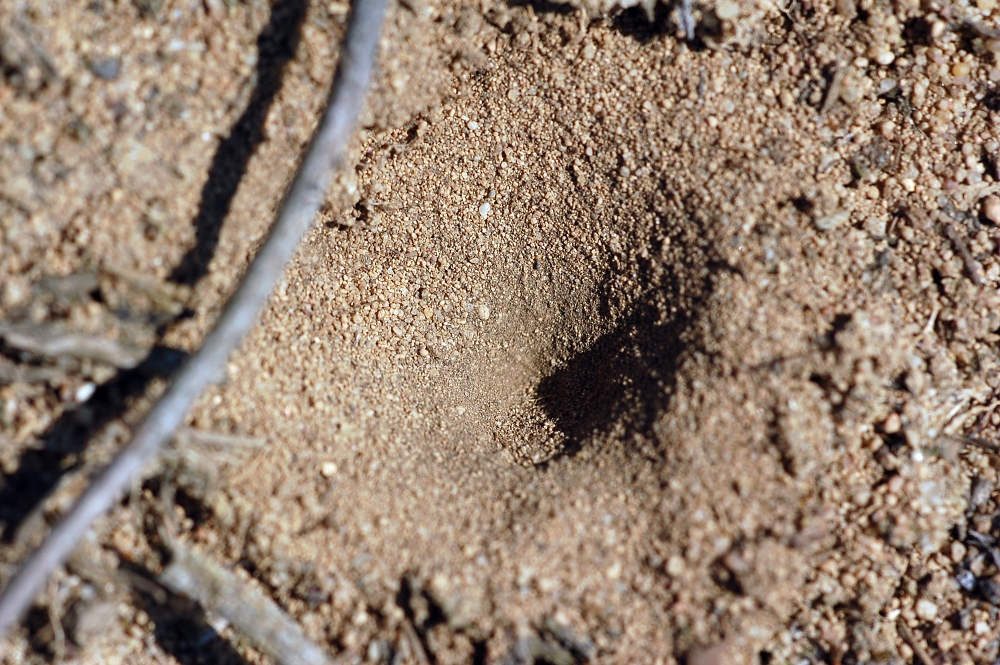
Pit-trap
