= Euroleon coreanus =

Scientific classification
- Domain: Eukaryota
- Kingdom: Animalia
- Phylum: Arthropoda
- Class: Insecta
- Order: Neuroptera
- Family: Myrmeleontidae
- Genus: Euroleon
- Species: E. coreanus

Binomial name
- Euroleon coreanus Okamoto, 1926

Species of insect

Euroleon coreanus is a species of antlion.
