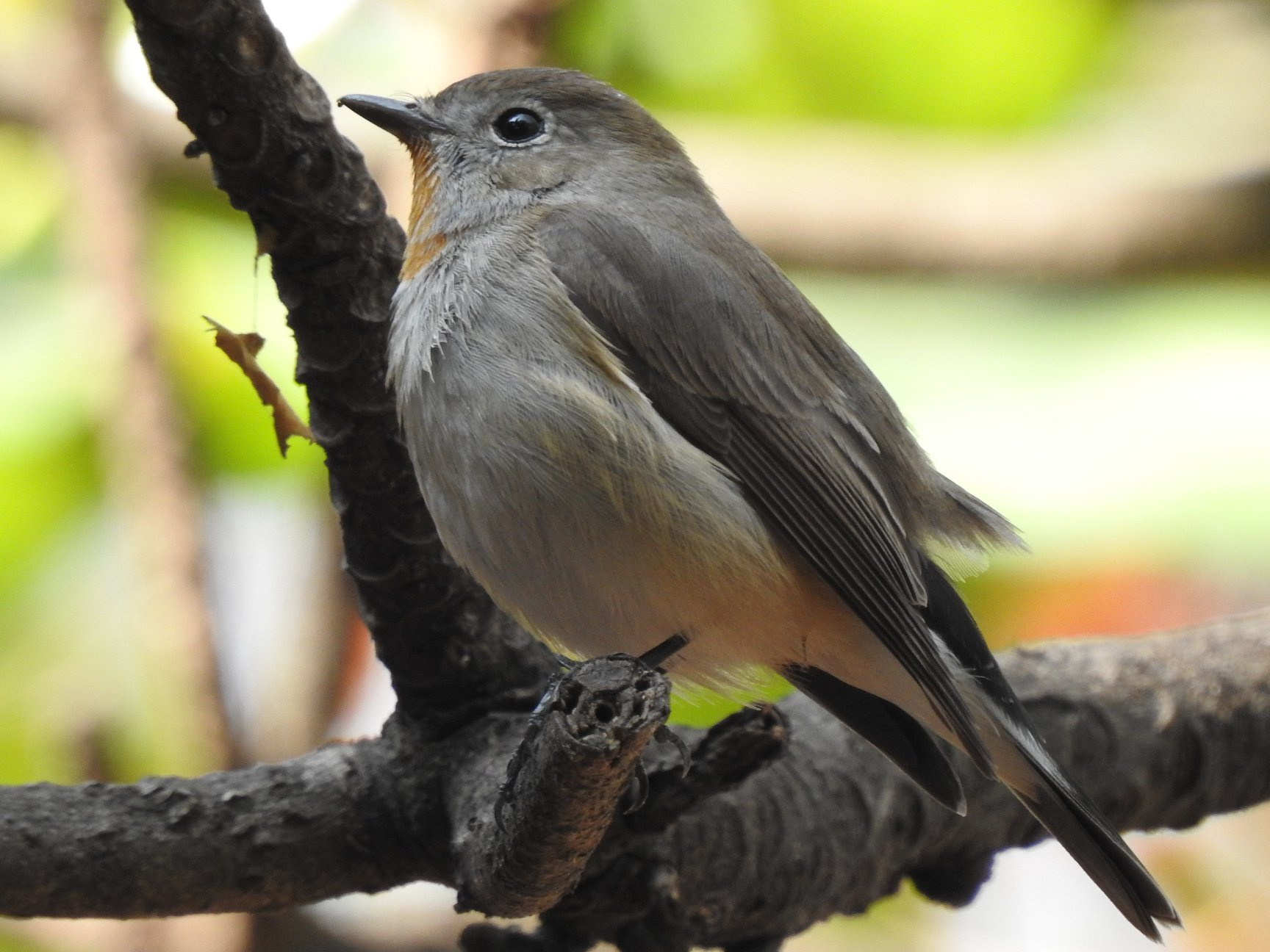

Conservation status
- Least Concern (IUCN 3.1)

Scientific classification
- Kingdom: Animalia
- Phylum: Chordata
- Class: Aves
- Order: Passeriformes
- Family: Muscicapidae
- Genus: Ficedula
- Species: F. albicilla

Binomial name
- Ficedula albicilla (Pallas, 1811)

Synonyms
- Ficedula parva albicilla

= Taiga flycatcher =

Species of bird

The taiga flycatcher or red-throated flycatcher (Ficedula albicilla) is a migratory bird in the family Muscicapidae. The species was first described by Peter Simon Pallas in 1811. The female has brown upper parts with a blackish tail flanked by white. The breast is buffish with underparts mostly white. The male has ear coverts and sides of the neck blue-tinged grey with breeding males having orange-red coloration on the throats. Unlike the taiga flycatcher, the female of the similar red-breasted flycatcher has a brown tail while the red colour in breeding males extends to the breast in the red-breasted flycatcher. It breeds in northern Eurasia from eastern Russia to Siberia and Mongolia. It is a winter visitor to South and South-east Asia in Bangladesh, Bhutan, India, Cambodia, Laos, Myanmar, Nepal, Malaysia, Thailand, China, Vietnam, and Japan. Its natural habitat is taiga forest. It is a rare vagrant to western Europe.

It was formerly considered a subspecies of the red-breasted flycatcher.

The genus name is from Latin and refers to a small fig-eating bird (ficus, fig) supposed to change into the blackcap in winter. The specific name albicilla is from Latin albus, white, and Neo-Latin cilla tail; this meaning of cilla arose from a misunderstanding of motacilla, the name for the wagtail.

== Gallery ==
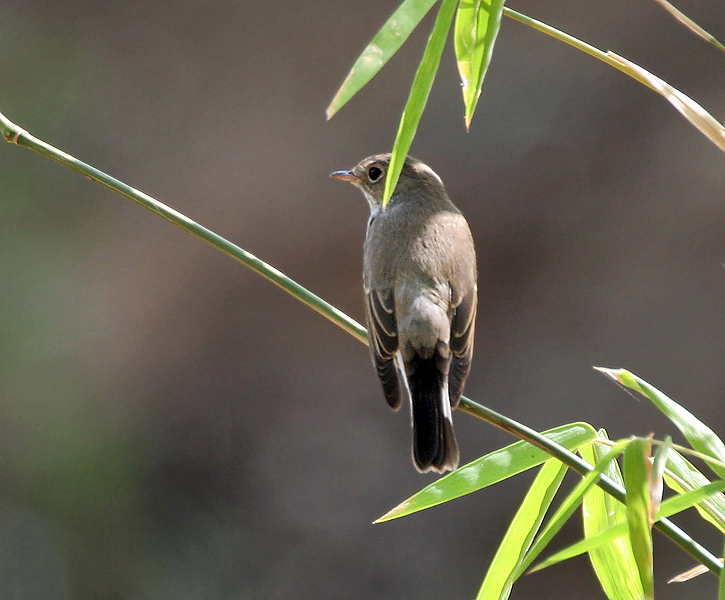
At Sindhrot in the Vadodara district of Gujarat, India

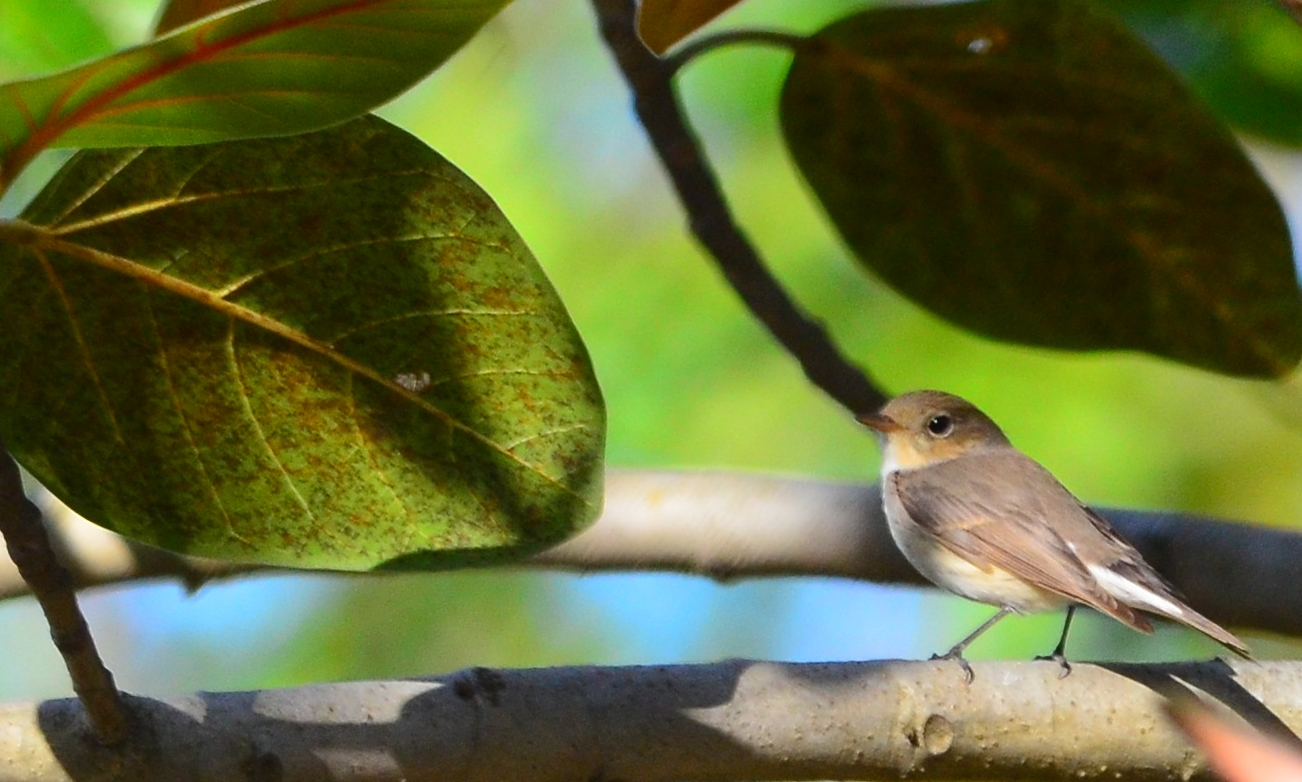
At Chandigarh, India

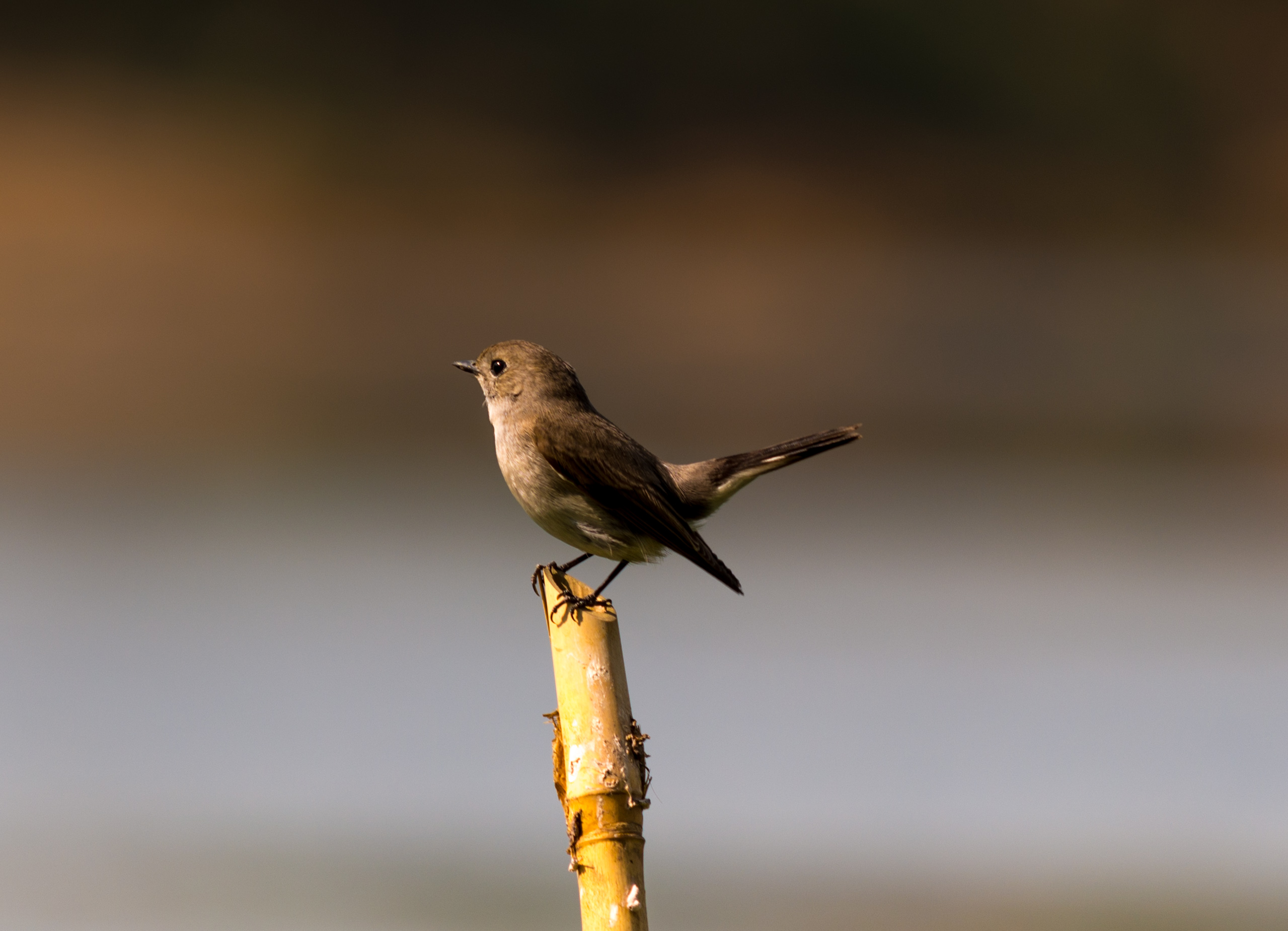
In Madobpur Lake, Shylet, Bangladesh

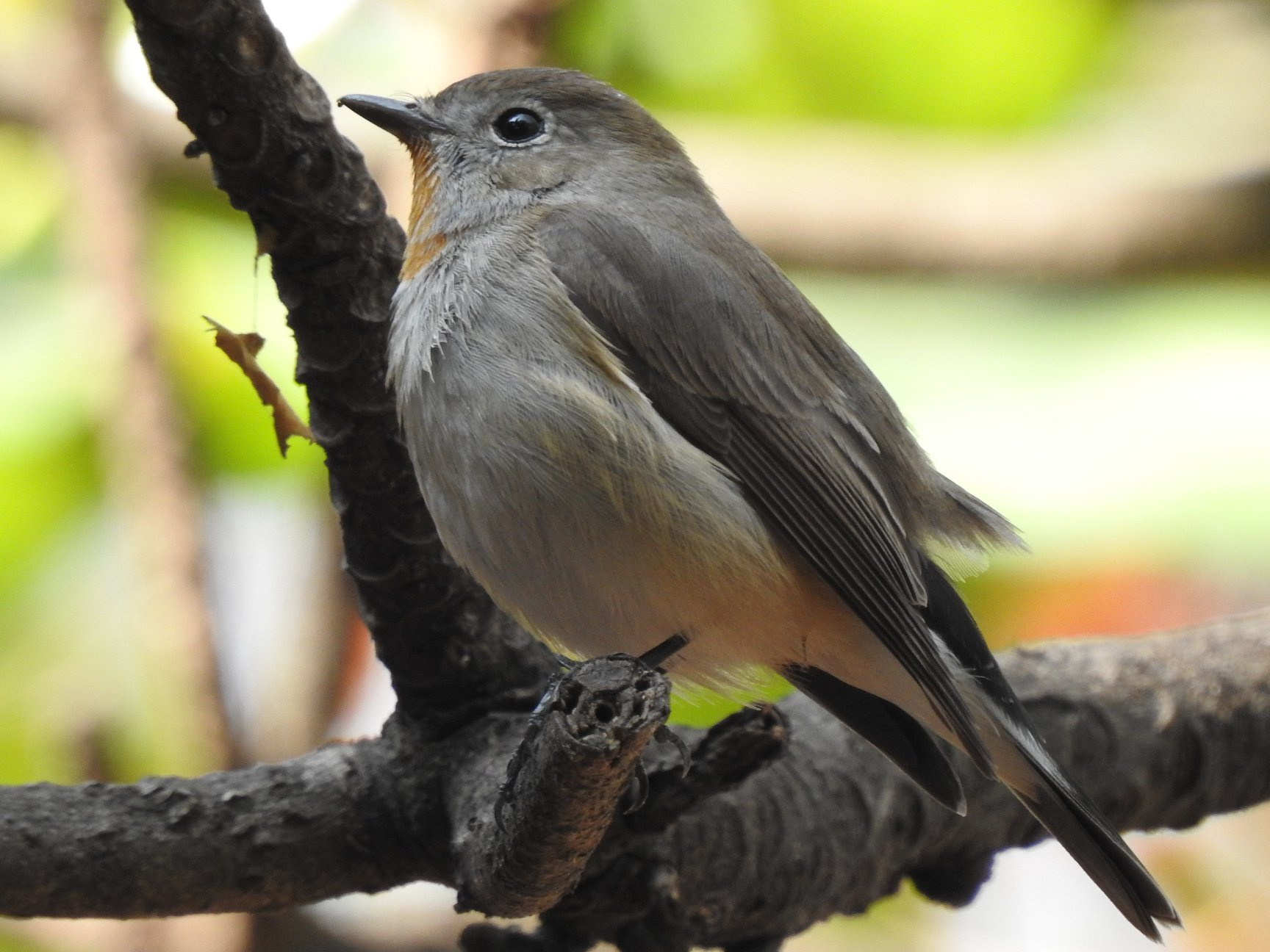
In Hyderabad, Telangana, India

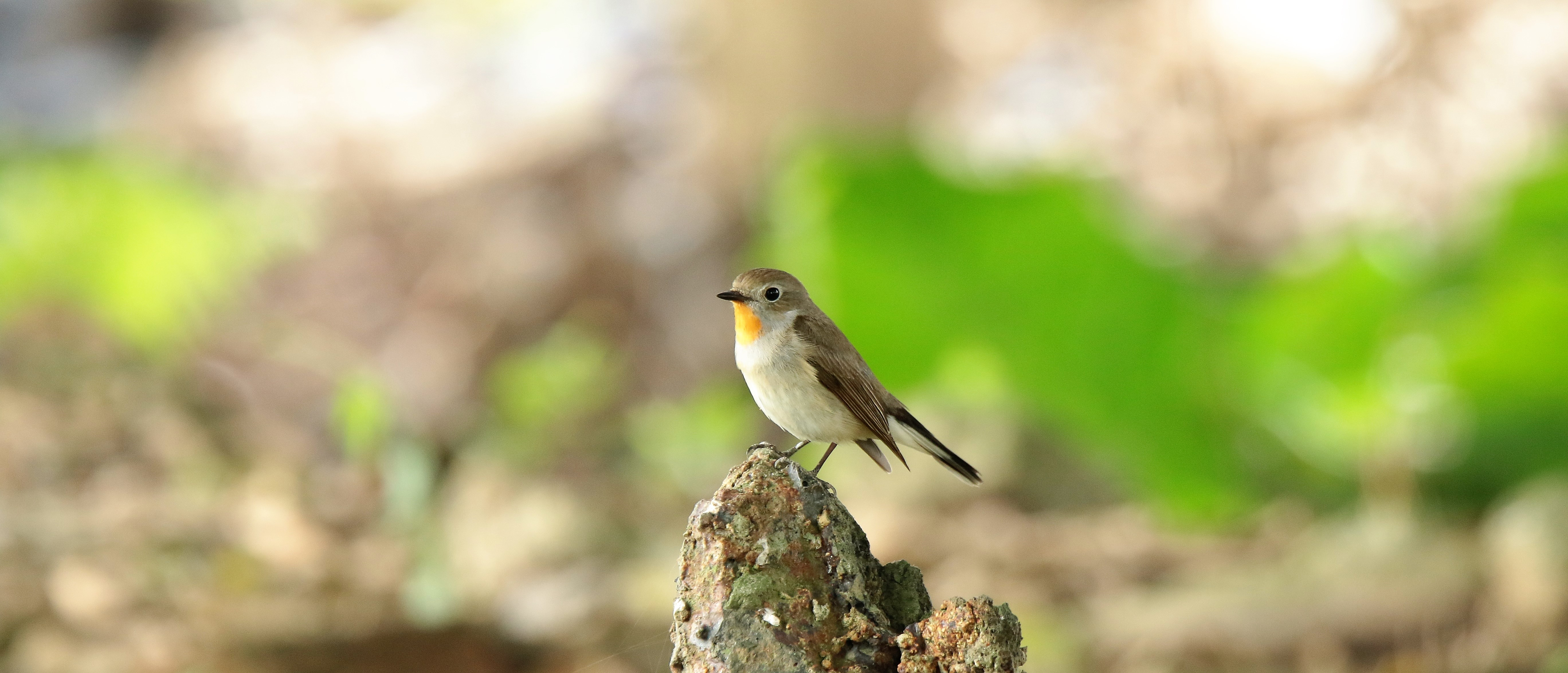
Male

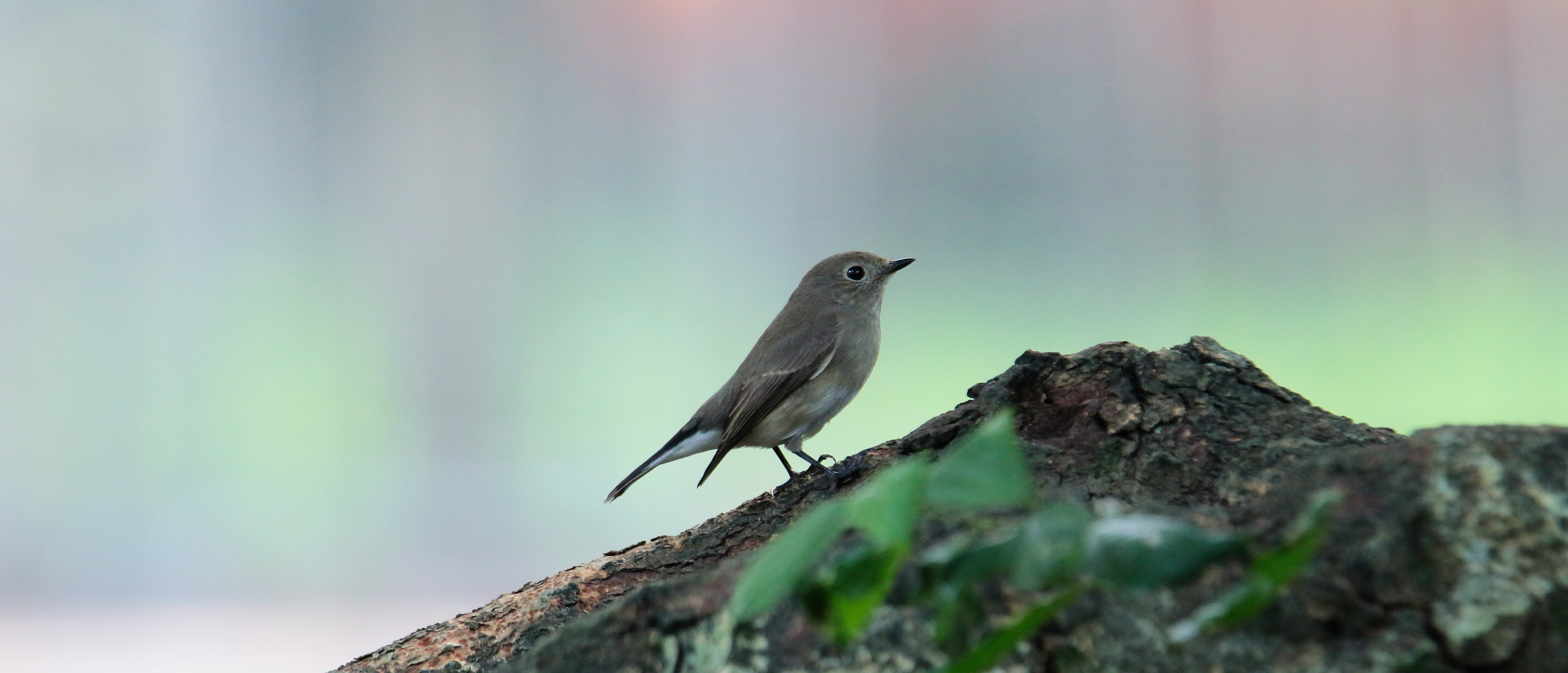
Female

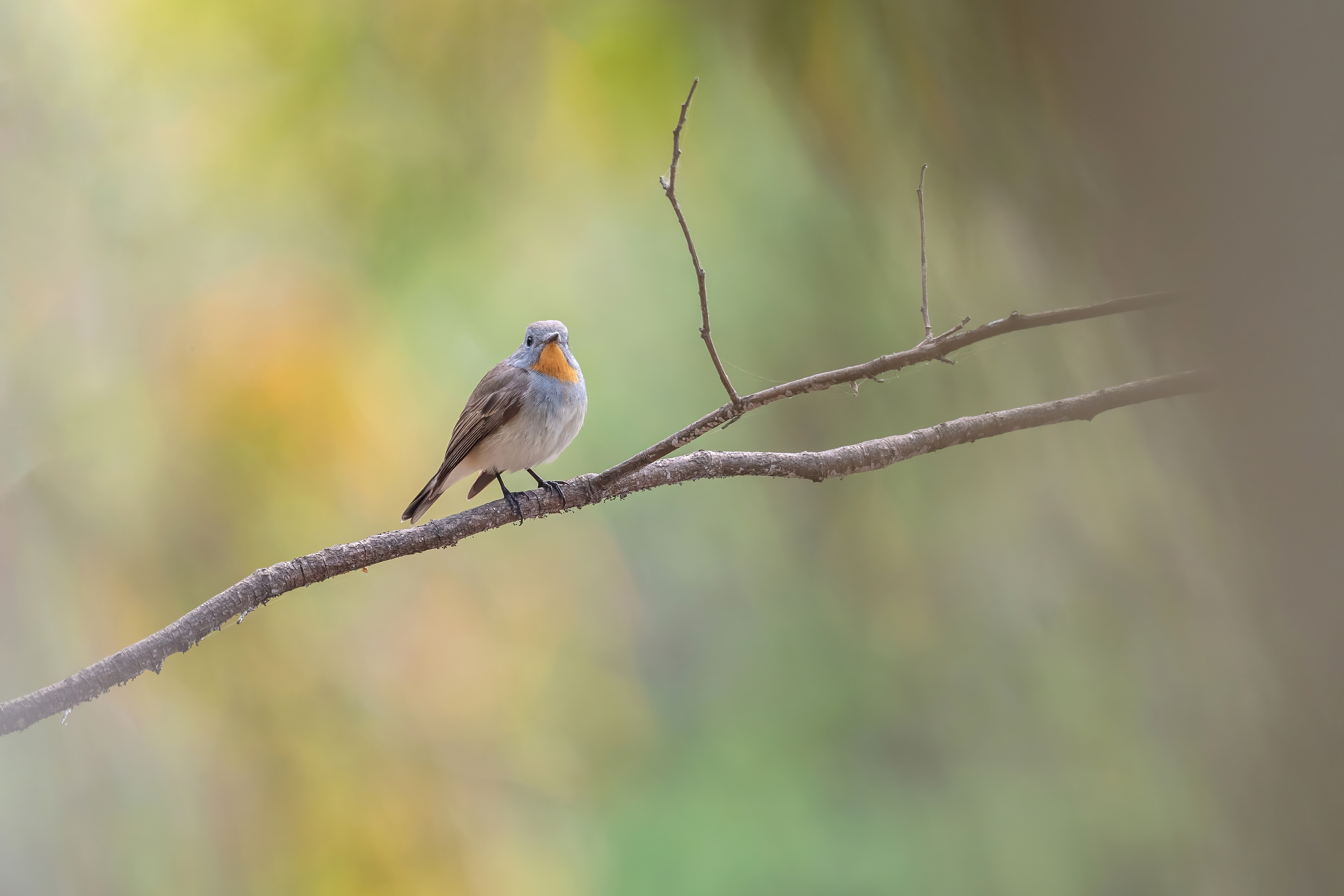
In Shivapuri Nagarjun National Park (near Jhor), Nepal
