= Kelling Quags =

Nature reserve near Kelling, Norfolk, England

Kelling Quags is a nature reserve near Kelling, Norfolk. It is 5.7 ha (14 acres) in extent. It is managed by the Norfolk Ornithological Association as a coastal fresh marsh. It consists of pools and wet grazing marshes behind a shingle ridge. It was purchased by the NOA in 1984.

It was designated as a Site of Special Scientific Interest (SSSI) in 1954, and in 1986 it was subsumed into the 7,700 ha (19,000 acres) North Norfolk Coast Site of Special Scientific Interest. The larger area is now additionally protected through Natura 2000 (SPA) and Ramsar listings, and is part of the Norfolk Coast Area of Outstanding Natural Beauty (AONB).

== Cited texts ==
- Harrup, Simon; Redman, Nigel (2010). Where to watch birds in Britain. London: Christopher Helm. ISBN 978-1-4081-1059-1.
