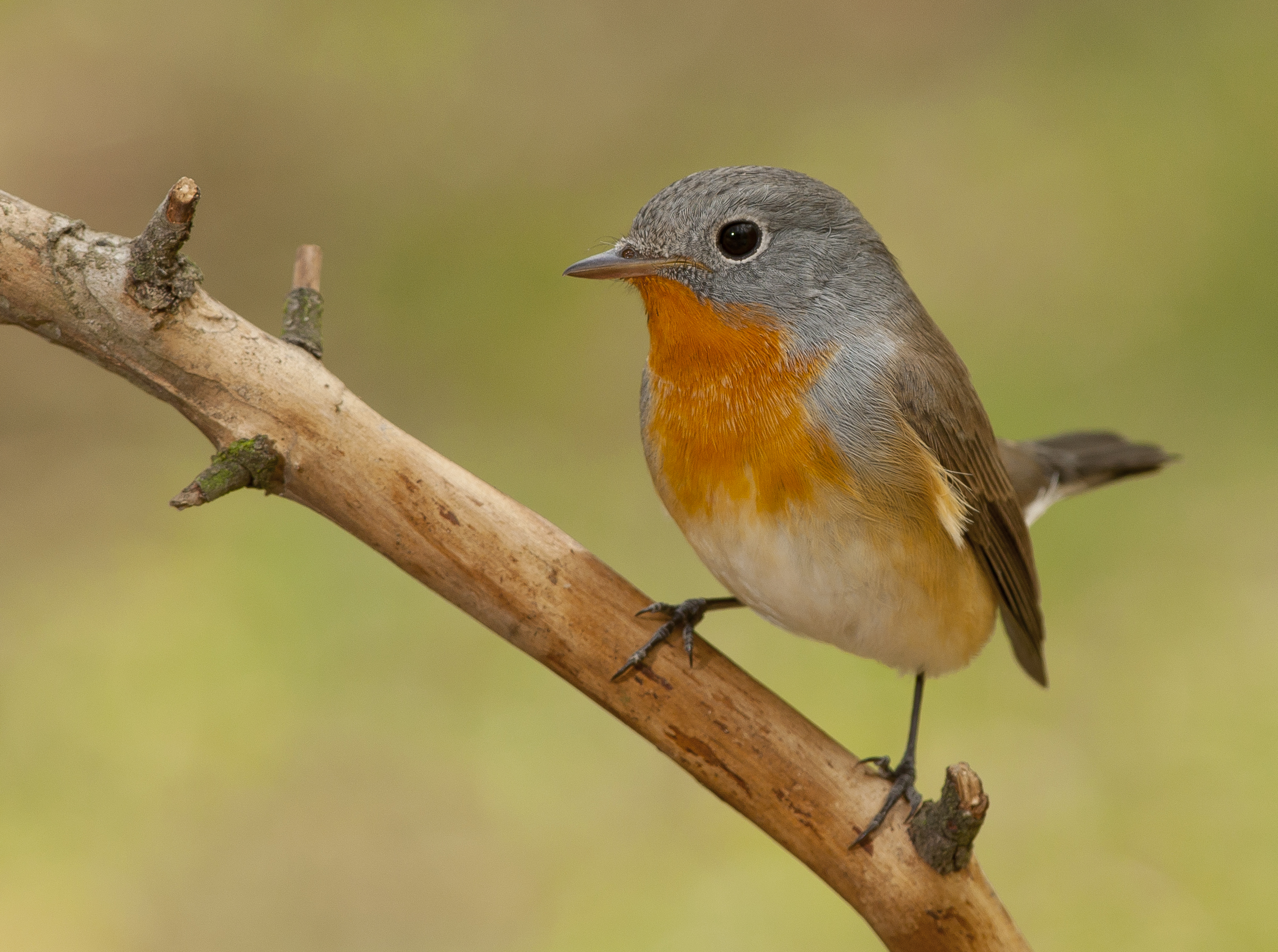
- Breeding male in Ukraine
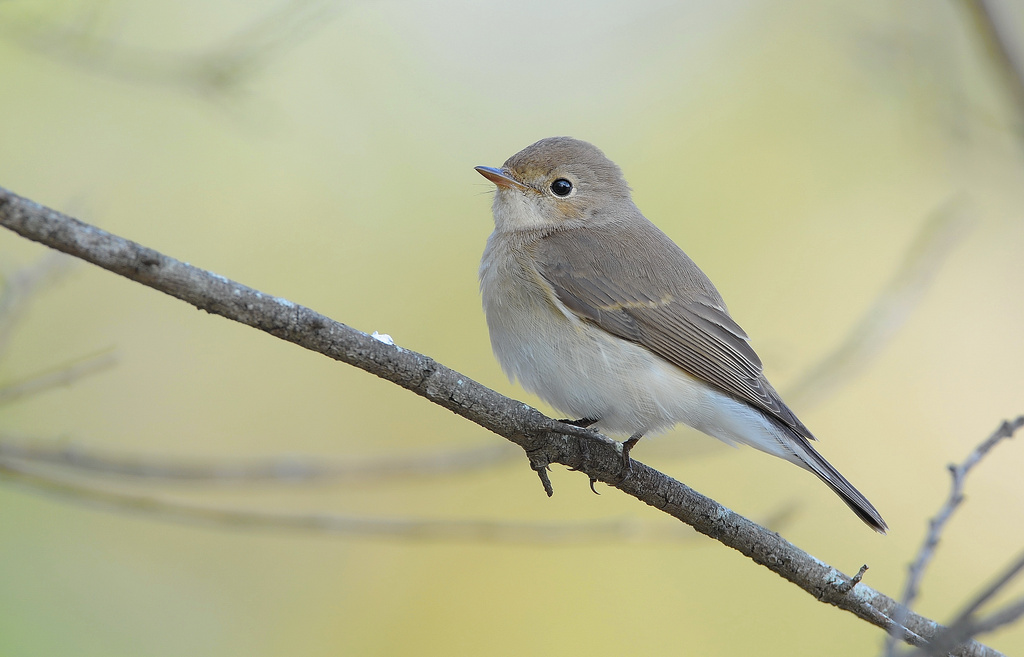
- Non-breeding female Song

Conservation status
- Least Concern (IUCN 3.1)

Scientific classification
- Kingdom: Animalia
- Phylum: Chordata
- Class: Aves
- Order: Passeriformes
- Family: Muscicapidae
- Genus: Ficedula
- Species: F. parva

Binomial name
- Ficedula parva (Bechstein, 1792)
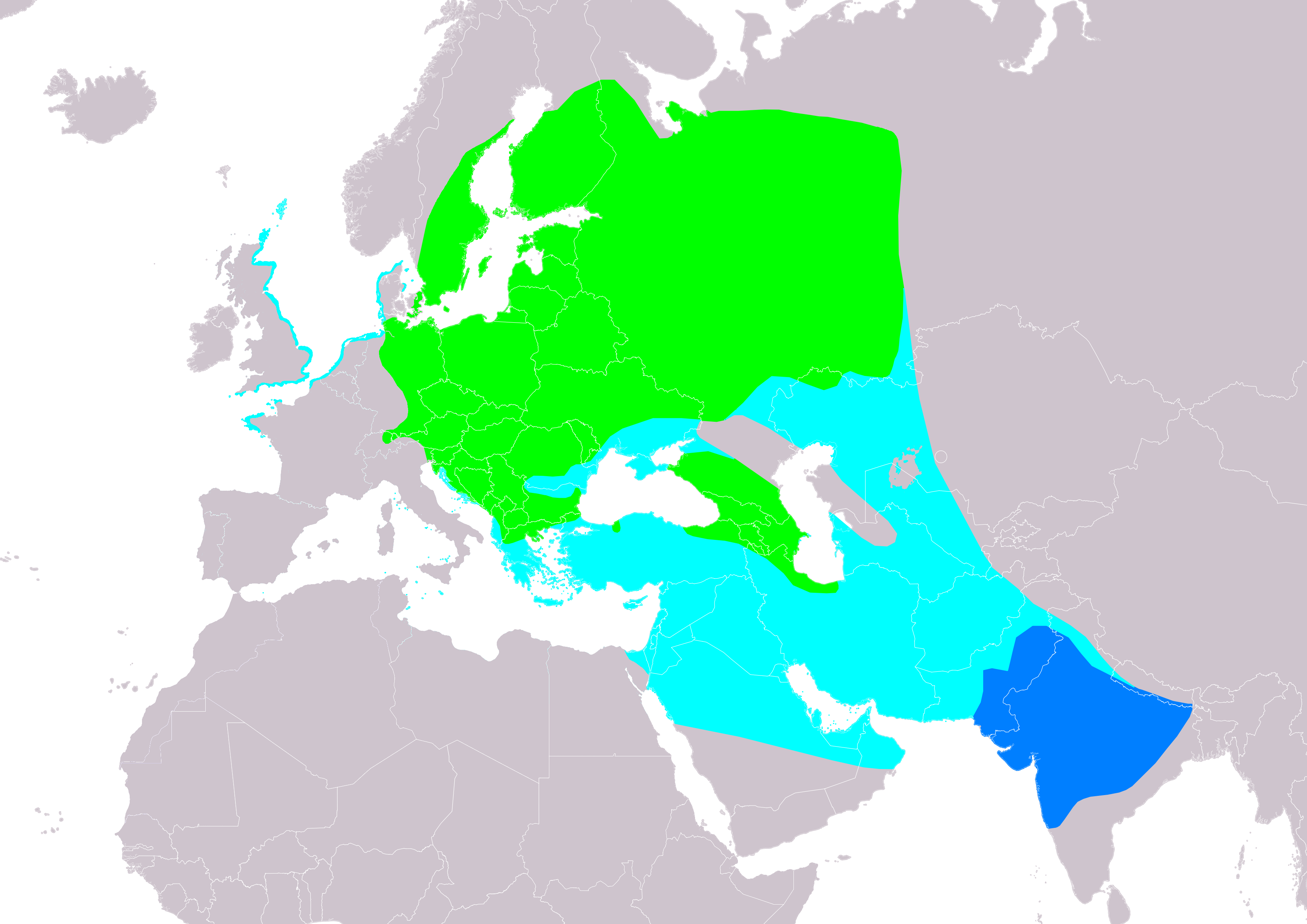
- Range of F. parva Breeding Passage Non-breeding

= Red-breasted flycatcher =

Species of bird

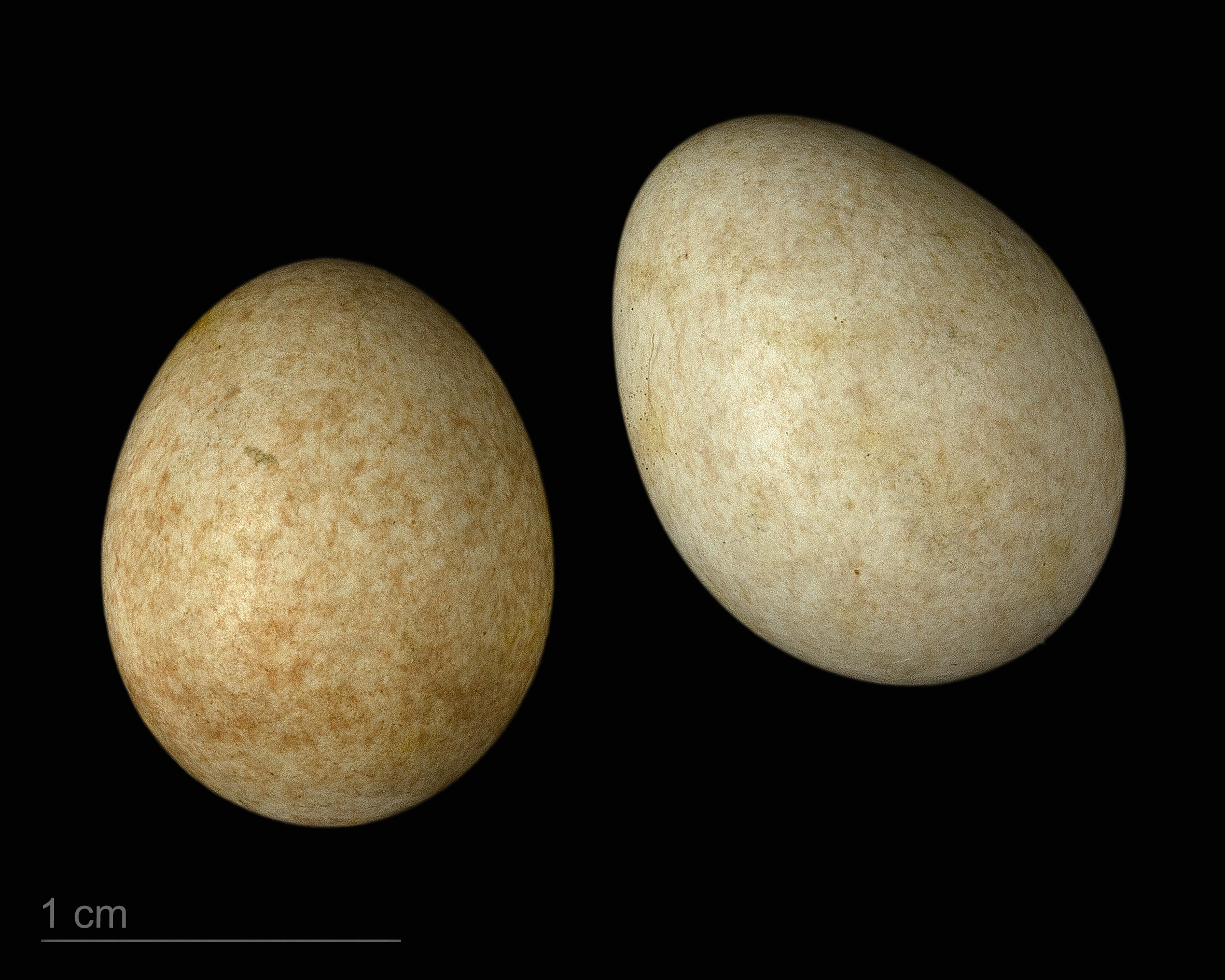
Ficedula parva - MHNT

The red-breasted flycatcher (Ficedula parva) is a small passerine bird in the Old World flycatcher family. It breeds in eastern Europe and across Central Asia and is migratory, wintering in south Asia. The breeding male is mainly muted brown above and white below, with a grey head and an orange throat. Females and immatures are similarly colored but lack the orange throat patch. The red-breasted flycatcher is a regular passage migrant in western Europe, whereas the collared flycatcher, which has a different migration route (wintering in Sub-Saharan Africa), is scarce. It forms a superspecies with the closely related taiga flycatcher and Kashmir flycatcher and can be distinguished from the former by its different song, warmer-toned plumage and the more extensive orange throat patch.

== Taxonomy ==
The red-breasted flycatcher is one of about 30 species placed in the flycatcher genus Ficedula, along with other European species such as the collared flycatcher and the more widely distributed European pied flycatcher. The genus was introduced by the French naturalist Mathurin Jacques Brisson in 1760, with Ficedula being the Latin name for a small fig-eating bird (ficus, "fig") supposed to change into the blackcap in winter. The specific parva is the feminine form of the Latin adjective parvus, meaning "small".

The species is monotypic: no subspecies are recognized. Two closely related species, the taiga flycatcher (F. albicilla) and the Kashmir flycatcher (F. subrubra), were formerly treated as subspecies of F. parva.

== Description ==
At 11–12 cm long, this is a relatively small flycatcher, only slightly larger than the Eurasian wren. Adult breeding males are mainly muted brown above and white below, with a grey head and orange throat. The bill is black and has a pale pinkish base along with the broad but pointed shape typical of aerial insectivores. The wheatear-like tail is distinctive in all plumages; the tail is entirely black except for the white base on the outer tail feathers. All plumages have a noticeable white eyering, and the overall smaller size (compared to other flycatchers) can be distinctive in some parts of its range. It can be distinguished from the closely related and very similar taiga flycatcher by its overall warmer coloration and the more extensive orange patch on the throat. The bill is also brighter and the pale pinkish base is more extensive on the red-breasted flycatcher.

=== Vocalisations ===
The song is usually three to four seconds long and consists of far-carrying and repetitive yet sweet-sounding whistles, like that of the European pied flycatcher, but less melodious. Each song phrase is usually preceded by quiet zit or tsi-it notes, followed by a descending multipart sequence that may recall the song of the willow warbler. The song varies significantly within its range and between individuals. While singing, males often display their throat patch and tail while partly opening their wings. In winter, red-breasted flycatchers are mostly silent, but they have a typical chip-chip-chr-rrr flycatcher call. They also produce a short, rattling call sounding like zrrrt, which is slower than that of the taiga flycatcher. Males often sing while perched on bare or dead branches at medium height, and will often begin singing just before landing. They only sing for a few weeks and stop singing completely once they find a mate.

== Behavior ==
Characteristic behaviors of red-breasted flycatchers include flicking and fanning their tail. They are a diurnal species which stay active into dusk and early night during the breeding season, at the height of which they will start singing about an hour before sunrise, with some even singing into the night. They are highly territorial during the breeding season, but are otherwise solitary or in small groups, sometimes mixed with other species. Rival males will defend their territories with loud singing and display postures, occasionally making short, non-violent rushes at each other. They are usually wary of predators, sometimes briefly abandoning their clutches once disturbed. The males will make alarm calls even at distant threats once the eggs have hatched. Eurasian jays will raid the nests of red-breasted flycatchers, and both parents may mob potential intruders.

=== Breeding ===
Red-breasted flycatchers nest from the middle of May to late June in Central and Eastern Europe. In the former Soviet Union, they start nesting in late May, nearly a month earlier than the taiga flycatcher. Between four and seven eggs are laid, though a typical clutch will include five or six. Nests are built using moss, leaves, dry grass stalks, root fibres and hair, sometimes with lichen woven into the exterior. The nests are usually placed in holes in trees or walls, on branches near the trunk, among the side shoots of a tree or even in tree forks. During a study in Hungary, nest boxes were seldom accepted, and breeding success was limited unless predation pressure was reduced through means such as chicken wire. A study on their nesting habits in Białowieża National Park in Poland found that the native red-breasted flycatchers often built their nests in hornbeam (Carpinus betulus) or lime (Tilia cordata). Most nest sites fell into one of three categories or types, namely chimney-shaped (usually a broken or rotten hole at the top of a tree), half cavities (shallow holes with large entrances) or shelves (usually under bark, outside the main trunk). Half cavities were the most common type of nest site overall, with most of them being located in hornbeams, whereas most chimney-shaped nest sites were found in limes. Nests were often built at a relatively low height above the ground, with hole entrances exposed to the south.

=== Feeding ===
Red-breasted flycatchers mainly feed on insects and small spiders, which are caught on the wing and sometimes from the ground. Ants, small beetles, hoverflies, true flies, and small moths (including larvae and pupae) form the bulk of the diet for both adults and nestlings. While perched on the lookout for insects, the tail is often flicked upwards while the wingtips are held down. The bird will inspect leaves and tree trunks in a manner similar to leaf warblers, and will take insects in short hovering flights. Foraging mostly occurs in or near the canopy, but also in shrubs and occasionally on the ground, where small snails will sometimes be taken. Caterpillars may also be taken amongst the oak foliage. In autumn, red-breasted flycatchers will supplement their diets with berries, especially elderberries, currants, and blackberries.

== Distribution ==
=== Habitat ===
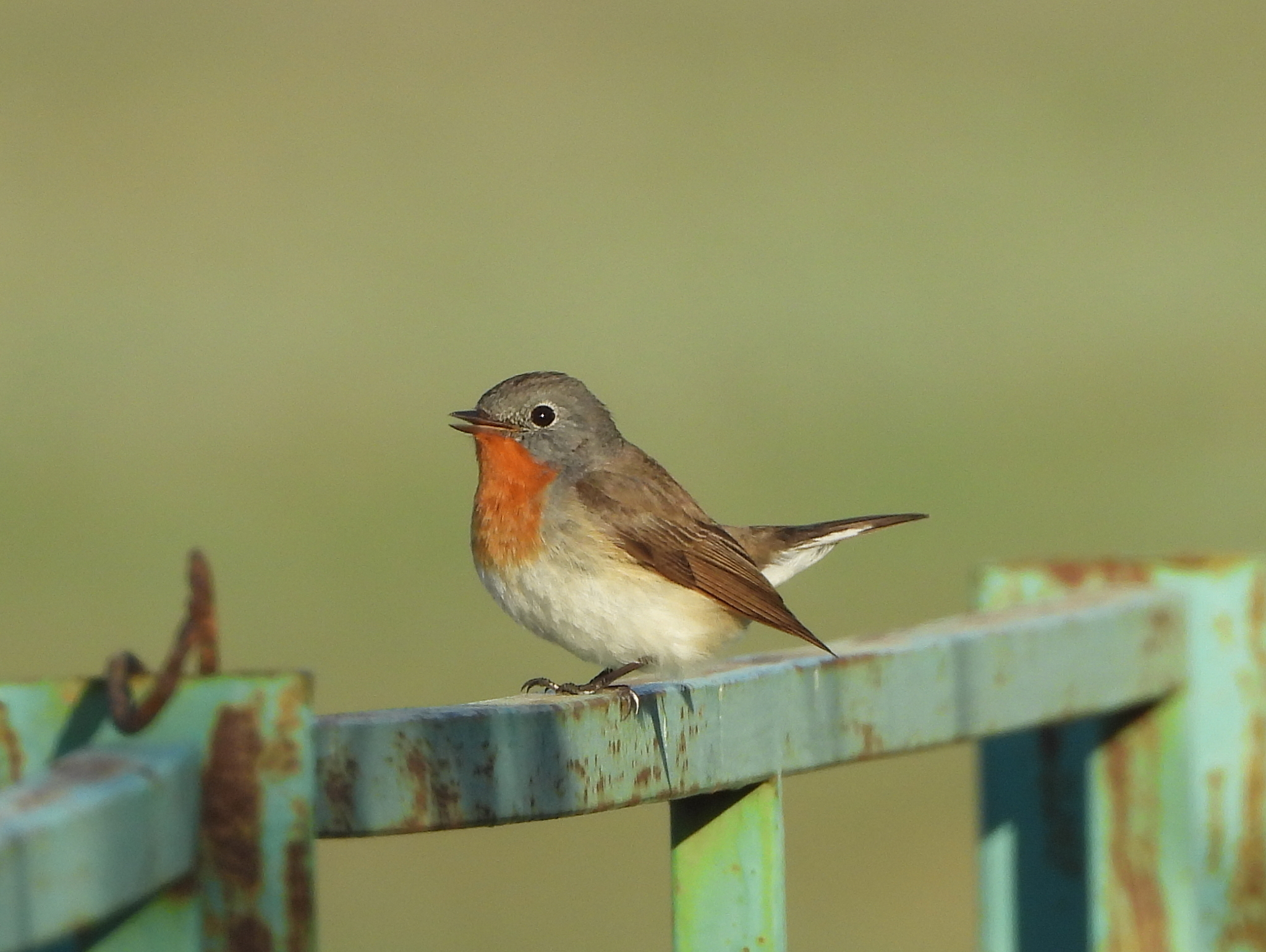
Typical posture with tail flicked upwards and wingtips held down

The red-breasted flycatcher breeds in mature old-growth forest, specifically temperate broadleaf and mixed forests, with a range that extends from Germany to the Caucasus and the Ural Mountains. The northernmost part of its breeding range lies in the Arctic Circle, while the southernmost populations breed in the central Balkans and east Carpathians. The easternmost part of its range overlaps with that of the taiga flycatcher, which has a range that extends east to the Pacific. The red-breasted flycatcher is scarcer in the westernmost part of its breeding range, being found only in scattered patches of suitable habitat in countries like Germany, Sweden and Austria. The preferred type of forest is usually beech, followed by oak, and northern populations are also present in spruce forest. Red-breasted flycatchers prefer to nest in tall trees with a lot of undergrowth and an open layer with twigs to perch on between the undergrowth and the canopy. Forest glades, clearings, and proximity to water are also favoured, and it may also occur in orchards and vineyards.

=== Migration ===
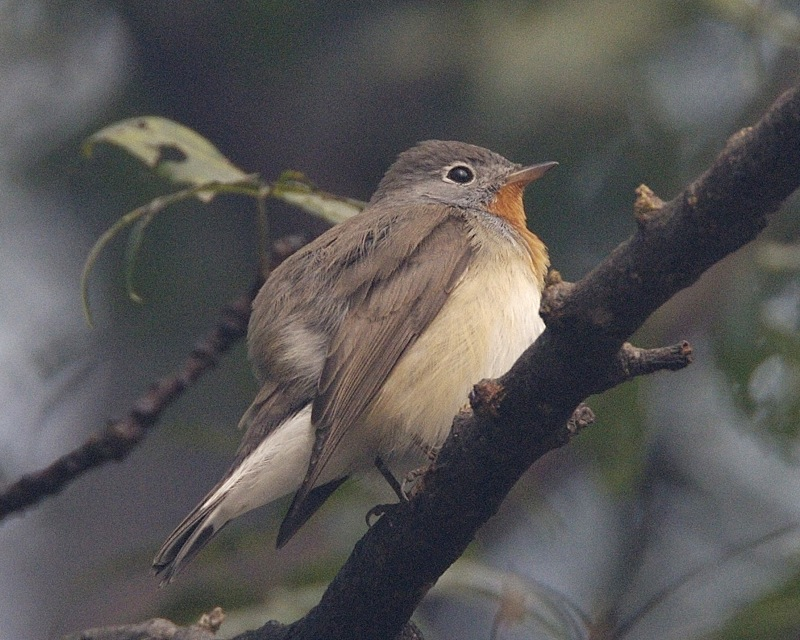
Wintering male in Keoladeo National Park, Rajasthan, India

The species can be seen during migration in western Europe before wintering mainly in India and Pakistan. It differs in this regard from most other European passerines, which winter in Sub-Saharan Africa. Their main wintering quarters lie in northwestern India, from northwest Pakistan and the Himalayan foothills south to Karnataka, and east to Bihar and Odisha. Red-breasted flycatchers tend to migrate alone or in small groups at night, moving by day only when food is scarce. Autumn migration begins in August, peaks in the middle of September, and can continue into early October. Spring migration is rapid, starting in the middle of March, with arrival in breeding grounds from late April to early May. As with many other species, the males migrate earlier than females, presumably due to strong selection for early arrivals to occupy ideal territories. Studies on their spring arrivals in Poland from 1973–2002 show that as temperatures increase, males are returning earlier, with this being the case for most other migratory species as well. The red-breasted flycatcher has been recorded as a rare vagrant to Iceland, Ireland, the Faroe Islands, the Canary Islands and Sudan.

== Status and conservation ==
The total population of the red-breasted flycatcher has been estimated at around 3.5 million breeding pairs, with a maximum estimate of roughly 5 million pairs. It is currently listed as a least-concern species by the IUCN Red List, with IUCN putting the number of mature individuals at around 6.5 to 10.5 million. Europe forms more than 95% of the global breeding range of the species, and the European population was said to be increasing by BirdLife International in 2015. The global population appears to be stable, though it has experienced severe decline in certain areas like eastern Hungary. Conservation efforts have been implemented to prevent local extinction in places where the species is threatened by habitat loss.
