= Holme Bird Observatory =

Nature reserve on the UK east coast

Holme Bird Observatory is a nature reserve near Holme-next-the-Sea, Norfolk, adjoining the Norfolk Wildlife Trust Holme Dunes reserve. It is 5 ha (13 acres) in extent, with Corsican pines and scrubby sand dunes as its main habitats. It is managed by the Norfolk Ornithological Association as a bird observatory to study migration. It has five bird hides and has operated a bird ringing programme since its foundation in 1962.

It is part of the 7,700 ha (19,000 acres) North Norfolk Coast Site of Special Scientific Interest. The larger area is now additionally protected through Natura 2000, Special Protection Area (SPA) and Ramsar listings, and is part of the Norfolk Coast Area of Outstanding Natural Beauty (AONB).
