= Salthouse Marshes =

Nature reserve in Norfolk, England

Coordinates: 52.956°N 1.082°E

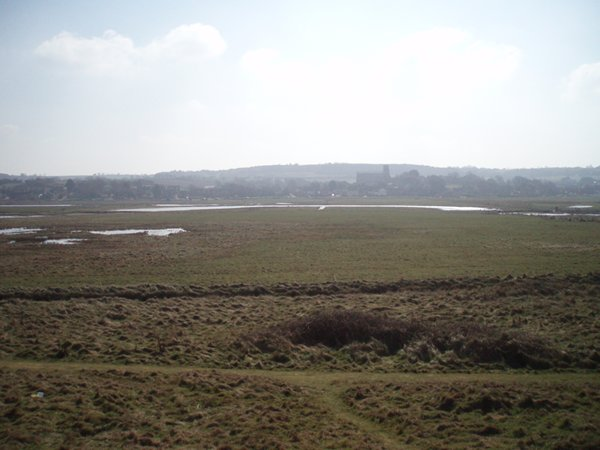
- Interactive map of Salthouse Marshes
- Type: Nature reserve
- Location: Sheringham, Norfolk
- OS grid: TG 082 443
- Area: 66 hectares (160 acres)
- Manager: Norfolk Wildlife Trust

Salthouse Marshes is a 66-hectare (160-acre) nature reserve west of Sheringham in Norfolk. It is managed by the Norfolk Wildlife Trust. It is part of the North Norfolk Coast Site of Special Scientific Interest, Geological Conservation Review site, Nature Conservation Review site, Grade I. Ramsar site, Special Areas of Conservation and Special Protection Area. It is also in the Norfolk Coast Area of Outstanding Natural Beauty.

This site has grazing marsh and small pools. Birds include snow buntings, Lapland buntings, little egrets, shore larks and barn owls.

There is public access.
