= Stiffkey =

Village in Norfolk, England

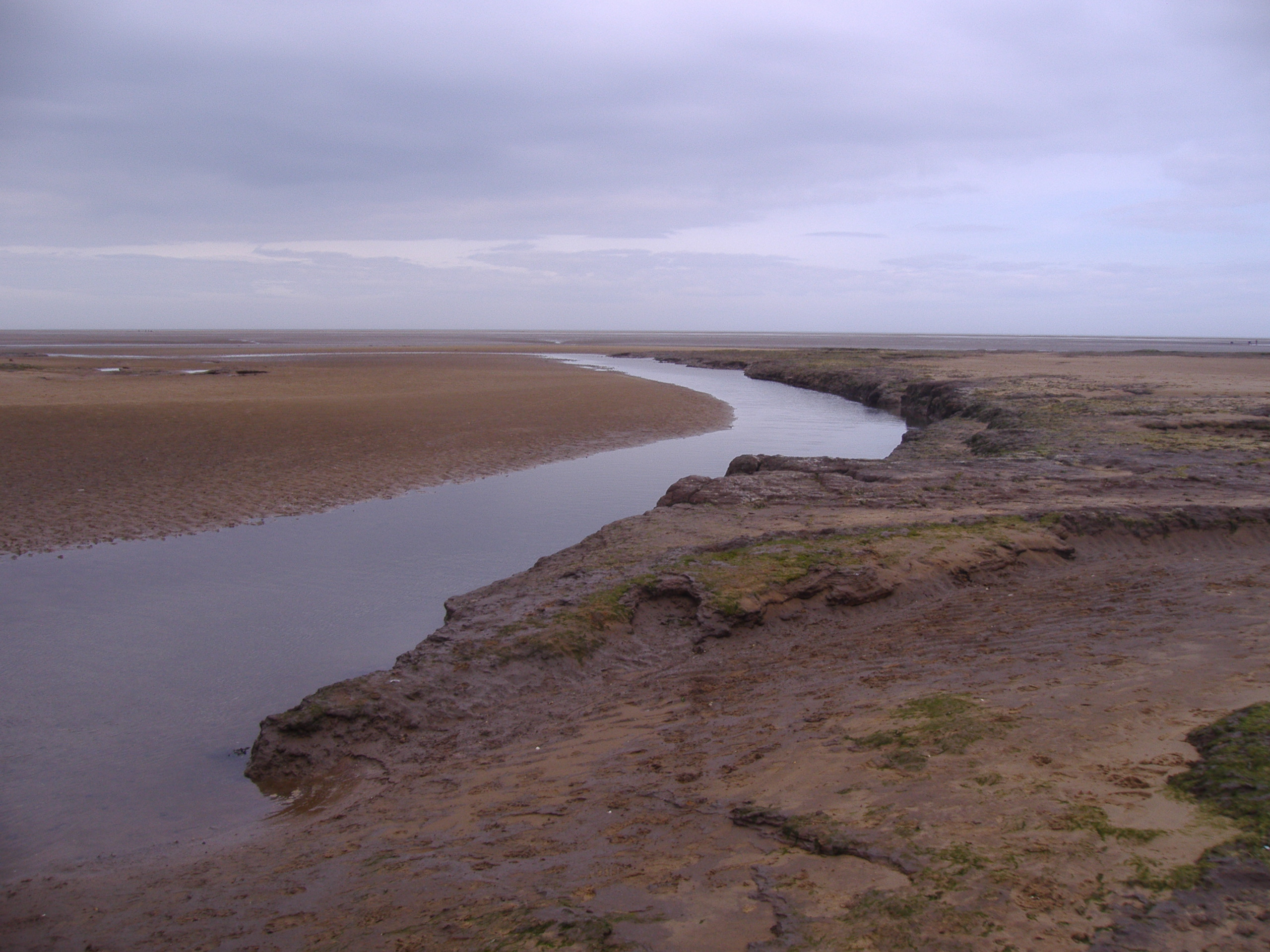
- Stiffkey Salt Marsh

- Location within Norfolk
- Area: 14.55 km^{2} (5.62 sq mi)
- Population: 209 (2011)
  - Density: 14/km^{2} (36/sq mi)
- OS grid reference: TF 971 430
  - London: 129 miles
- Civil parish: Stiffkey
- District: North Norfolk
- Shire county: Norfolk
- Region: East
- Country: England
- Sovereign state: United Kingdom
- Post town: WELLS-NEXT-THE-SEA
- Postcode district: NR23
- Police: Norfolk
- Fire: Norfolk
- Ambulance: East of England
- UK Parliament: North Norfolk

Stiffkey (/ˈstjuːki, ˈstɪfki/) is a village and civil parish on the north coast of the English county of Norfolk. It is situated on the A149 coast road, some 6 km (3.7 mi) east of Wells-next-the-Sea, 6 km (3.7 mi) west of Blakeney, and 40 km (25 mi) north-west of the city of Norwich. The civil parish has an area of 14.55 km^{2} (5.62 sq mi) and in the 2001 census had a population of 223 in 105 households, the population falling to 209 at the 2011 Census.

For the purposes of local government, the parish falls within the district of North Norfolk.

The parish church of St John the Baptist is a Grade I listed building.

The River Stiffkey runs through the village, from which it takes its name. The river was used to power the Stiffkey watermill which was built before 1579. It was a small mill, running two pairs of stones, and it operated until 1881 when it was put up for auction as a warehouse. Little now remains of the mill; just a few low ruined walls showing the position of the building.

Stiffkey is noted for cockles Cerastoderma edule which still retain the old name of 'Stewkey blues'. These are stained blue by the mud in which they live.

== Etymology and geology ==
Stiffkey is first evidenced in the Domesday Book of 1086, and means 'stump island, island with stumps of trees'.

The local historical pronunciation of the village is 'Stiff-key' and not ‘Stew-key’. The mis-pronunciation is primarily due to the underlying glauconitic clays (blue-green clays – formerly Blue Marl), BGS lexicon lithological description: Pale to dark grey or blue-grey clay or mudstone, glauconitic in part, with a sandy base. Discrete bands of phosphatic nodules (commonly preserving fossils), some pyrite and calcareous nodules. In Norfolk, the Cretaceous Gault Formation becomes calcareous before passing northwards into the Hunstanton Formation ("Red Chalk"). In places thin, variable junction beds at the base include some limestones. (BGS lexicon: Gault Formation which belongs to the Selbourne Group).

The blue clays are known locally as 'Norfolk Stew', hence the name 'Stew-Key' [Stew-quay] as the flats there and the quays use the underlying blue clays (muds) weathered from Cretaceous bedrock. As already noted the local fauna of cockles can be stained with relation to their habitat. Glauconite is an iron- and potassium-rich mineral and the solid phase reactions can produce the iron- and potassium-rich dye Prussian blue.

The correct and locally used pronunciation is ‘Stiff-key’. In the Domesday book it is spelt ‘Stiucai’, when this was written there were no separate letters for ‘V’ and ‘U’. All names with a ‘V’ sound were spelt with a ‘U’. It is thought that ‘Stew-key’ arose from the mis-reading of the Domesday spelling.

Later on English spelling evolved, and by 1300 the spelling ‘Styfkey’ appeared in documents, which is pretty hard to mis-represent. [Stiffkey with Cockthorpe: A story of Norfolk People, 2013].

== Wildlife sites ==
Forming part of the Blakeney Point, a National nature reserve, the Stiffkey Salt Marshes create an extensive habitat for a wide range of birds and plant life. The salt marshes which are owned and managed by the National Trust are open to the public.

Stiffkey Fen 52.954760°N 0.956528°E is nature reserve located close to the village covering 35 acres (14 ha). The reserve is open to the public, and has a reed bed and freshwater lagoons providing a habitat for many species of birds. In October 2020, a rufous bush chat was found at Stiffkey, the first time this species had been seen in Britain since 1980.

== Military camp ==
An artillery and anti-aircraft training camp was established south of the marshes in 1938 and remained in operation throughout World War II. Aircraft from RAF Langham would tow targets over the marshes for the trainee gunners to aim at. After the war the camp was used for training USAAF B-29 gunners until the site's closure in 1955. Vestiges of the former camp can still be seen including the remains of a circular runway, known locally as 'The Whirlygig', used by the USAAF to launch radio-controlled aerial targets. The former officers' mess is now a boat restoration charity workshop and visitor centre and other surviving buildings have been converted to agricultural use or incorporated into the present day holiday camp site.

== Notable people ==
Member of Parliament Sir Nathaniel Bacon (1546?–1622), second son of Sir Nicholas Bacon and half-brother of Sir Francis Bacon, was buried in Stiffkey church.

The village is remembered as the parish whose rector, Harold Davidson, faced charges of immorality and was defrocked in 1932. He was a popular priest in the area and the villagers asked his family to allow him to be buried in Stiffkey when he died, rather than in the family tomb in Sholing, where he was born. They have cared for his grave for many years. (He died, rather improbably, after he was mauled by a lion.)

The author Henry Williamson bought a farm in Stiffkey. The Story of a Norfolk Farm (1941) is his account of his first years of farming here.

On 11 May 1978, the author, soldier and politician Aubrey Buxton was created a life peer as Baron Buxton of Alsa, of Stiffkey in the County of Norfolk. He died there in 2009.

Singer Dennis Lotis resided in Stiffkey until his death.

The British explorer and secret agent Frederick Marshman Bailey (1882–1967) spent his final years in Stiffkey.

== Public access ==
The Norfolk Coast Path runs between the village and the sea and further on to Blakeney to the East and Wells-next-the-Sea to the West. Sanders Coaches Coast Hopper CH1 bus service connects Stiffkey with Wells-next-the-Sea and Cromer.
