= Stiffkey Fen =

Nature reserve in Norfolk, England

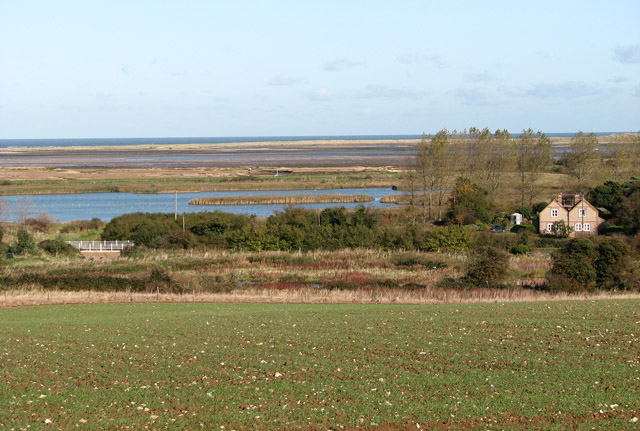
The fen is in the middle distance

Stiffkey Fen is a nature reserve near Stiffkey, Norfolk. It is 14 ha (35 acres) in extent, and was created from farmland by Lord Buxton, who also, with the support of the Environment Agency, improved the wetland by slowing the water flow through the fen. The reserve has a reed bed and a fresh water lagoon and islands. It has a winter roost of up to 4,000 northern lapwings, and also hosts water rails and bearded tits.

It is part of the 7,700-hectare (19,000-acre) North Norfolk Coast Site of Special Scientific Interest. The larger area is now additionally protected through Natura 2000, Special Protection Area (SPA) and Ramsar listings, and is part of the Norfolk Coast Area of Outstanding Natural Beauty (AONB). The reserve was donated to the Buxton Conservation Trust in 1999.
