= Norfolk Ornithological Association =

Ornithological society based in Norfolk, United Kingdom

The Norfolk Ornithological Association owns a number of nature reserves in Norfolk. This ornithological society, founded in 1970, has its headquarters at the Holme Bird Observatory near Holme-next-the-Sea, which adjoining the Norfolk Wildlife Trust Holme Dunes reserve.

The organisation has a particular interest in migration, especially at sites near the coast like the Holme and Walsey Hills reserves, and the Holme observatory alone had ringed 50,000 birds of 300 species by its fiftieth anniversary in 2012. The Holme reserve has a range of different habitats and a number of nationally scarce plants. There is a regular moth trapping programme. The observatory is in the North Norfolk Coast Site of Special Scientific Interest, an area additionally protected through Natura 2000, Special Protection Area (SPA) and Ramsar listings, and part of the Norfolk Coast Area of Outstanding Natural Beauty (AONB).

== The reserves ==
The NOA owns or manages

- Holme Bird Observatory
- Redwell Marsh
- Whiddington Wood
- Walsey Hills
- Salthouse Estate
- Kelling Quags
- Hempton Marsh
