= List of Sites of Special Scientific Interest in Norfolk =

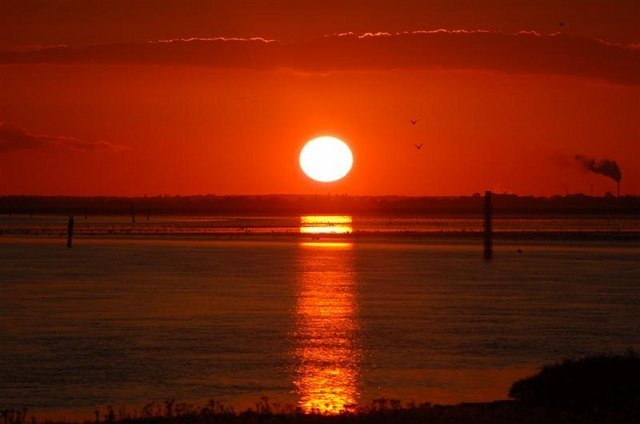
Sunset on Breydon Water

In England, Sites of Special Scientific Interest (SSSIs) are designated by Natural England, which is responsible for protecting England's natural environment. Designation as an SSSI gives legal protection to the most important wildlife and geological sites. As of May 2020 there are 163 SSSIs in Norfolk, out of which 123 are biological, 25 are geological and 15 are both biological and geological.

Sixty-one sites are Special Areas of Conservation, forty-four are Special Protection Areas, thirty-two are Ramsar sites, forty are Geological Conservation Review sites, thirty-five are Nature Conservation Review sites, eighteen are national nature reserves, ten are local nature reserves, twenty-eight are in Areas of Outstanding Natural Beauty, one is on the Register of Historic Parks and Gardens and three contain scheduled monuments. Twenty-two sites are managed by the Norfolk Wildlife Trust, one by the Suffolk Wildlife Trust, three by the National Trust, one by the Royal Society for the Protection of Birds and one by the Wildfowl & Wetlands Trust.

Norfolk is a county in East Anglia. It has an area of 2,074 square miles (5,370 square kilometres) and a population as of mid-2017 of 898,400. The top level of local government is Norfolk County Council with seven second tier councils: Breckland District Council, Broadland District Council, Great Yarmouth Borough Council, King's Lynn and West Norfolk Borough Council, North Norfolk District Council, Norwich City Council and South Norfolk District Council. The county is bounded by Cambridgeshire, Suffolk, Lincolnshire and the North Sea.

== Interest ==
- B = site of biological interest
- G = site of geological interest

== Public access ==
- FP = access to footpaths through the site only
- NO = no public access to site
- PL = public access at limited times
- PP = public access to part of site
- YES = public access to all or most of the site

== Other classifications ==
- AONB = Area of Outstanding Natural Beauty
- GCR = Geological Conservation Review
- LNR = Local nature reserve
- NCR = Nature Conservation Review site
- NNR = National nature reserve
- NT = National Trust
- NWT = Norfolk Wildlife Trust
- Ramsar = Ramsar site, an internationally important wetland site
- RHPG= Register of Historic Parks and Gardens of Special Historic Interest in England
- RSPB = Royal Society for the Protection of Birds
- SAC = Special Area of Conservation
- SM = Scheduled monument
- SPA = Special Protection Area under the European Union Directive on the Conservation of Wild Birds
- SWT = Suffolk Wildlife Trust
- WWT = Wildfowl & Wetlands Trust

== Sites ==
Site name	Photograph	B	G	Area (Note: The area and grid reference are taken from the "Details" page for each site on the Natural England database.)	Public access	Location	Other classifications	Map (Note: The maps are provided by Natural England on the Magic Map website.)	Citation (Note: Citations are provided for each site by Natural England.)	Description
Alderfen Broad	Alderfen Broad	✓		21.3 hectares (53 acres)	YES	Norwich; 52.72°N 1.484°E; TG 354 195	NWT, Ramsar, SAC, SPA	Map	Citation	This area of fenland peat has open water, carr woodland and reed swamp. Breeding birds include the great crested grebe, water rail, grasshopper warbler and reed warbler.
Alderford Common	Alderford Common	✓		17.5 hectares (43 acres)	YES	Norwich; 52.720°N 1.149°E; TG 128 183		Map	Citation	The common has a thin layer of glacial sands and gravels over chalk. Habitats include bracken heath, scrub, woodland and ponds, together with species rich grassland in former chalk quarries. An old lime kiln is used by bats and a wide variety of birds breed on the site.
Ant Broads and Marshes	Ant Broads and Marshes	✓		745.3 hectares (1,842 acres)	PP	Great Yarmouth; 52.739°N 1.502°E; TG 365 215	NCR, NNR, NWT, Ramsar, SAC, SPA	Map	Citation	This site in the valley of the River Ant is described by Natural England as the "finest example of unpolluted valley fen in Western Europe". It has a network of dykes which support a diverse variety of aquatic plants, and its fenland invertebrate fauna is of national importance.
Aslacton Parish Land	Aslacton Parish Land	✓		4.4 hectares (11 acres)	NO	Norwich; 52.481°N 1.174°E; TM 156 917		Map	Citation	This site has wet and dry unimproved meadows with a rich flora. Uncommon species include marsh arrowgrass, yellow rattle, fragrant orchid, common butterwort and adder's tongue. Common snipe often breed there.
Badley Moor	Badley Moor	✓		18.3 hectares (45 acres)	YES	Dereham; 52.666°N 0.974°E; TG 012 117	SAC	Map	Citation	This area of spring-fed fen and grassland in the valley of the River Tud has tufa hummocks formed by the deposit of calcium carbonate. It has an exceptionally rich fen community with a carpet of moss on wet slopes with many unusual plants. There are overgrown dykes with flora including narrow-leaved water-parsnip and water dropwort.
Barnham Cross Common	Barnhamcross Common	✓		69.1 hectares (171 acres)	YES	Thetford; 52.398°N 0.740°E; TL 865 813	LNR, NCR, SAC, SPA	Map	Citation	This grassland and heath common has diverse habitats and a rich flora, including several nationally rare plants. There are nearly a hundred species of birds, including sixty which breed on the site, and a wide range of invertebrates.
Bawsey	Bawsey		✓	2.6 hectares (6.4 acres)	NO	King's Lynn; 52.746°N 0.487°E; TF 680 194	GCR	Map	Citation	This site has till dating to the Quaternary period, unsorted glacial sediments, with a depth of up to five metres. It is separated from the main East Anglian till sheet, and it is the type site for the Bawsey Calcareous Till.
Beeston Cliffs	Beeston Cliffs	✓	✓	10.3 hectares (25 acres)	YES	Sheringham; 52.943°N 1.227°E; TG 169 433	GCR	Map	Citation	This is the type site for the Beestonian stage of the Early Pleistocene, between around 1.8 and 0.8 million years ago. It has both marine and freshwater deposits. There is a nationally rare plant, purple broomrape, in calcareous grassland on the clifftop.
Beetley and Hoe Meadows	Beetley and Hoe Meadows	✓		11.4 hectares (28 acres)	PP	Dereham; 52.715°N 0.930°E; TF 980 171	NWT	Map	Citation	This site is described by Natural England as "one of the finest remaining areas of wet unimproved grassland in Norfolk". It is traditionally managed by summer grazing, with plants such as glaucous sedge and bog pimpernel in marshy parts and blunt-flowered rush and carnation sedge in permanently wet areas.
Bilsey Hill	Bilsey Hill		✓	3.0 hectares (7.4 acres)	NO	Holt; 52.934°N 1.009°E; TG 023 416	AONB, GCR	Map	Citation	This 20-metre (22-yard) deep Pleistocene exposure exhibits a sequence of glacial till, sands and gravels associated with the melt phase of the ice sheet.
Blackborough End Pit	Blackborough End Pit		✓	13.2 hectares (33 acres)	NO	King's Lynn; 52.702°N 0.469°E; TF 669 145	GCR	Map	Citation	This site is important as a demonstration of erosion during the Lower Cretaceous. The Carstone Formation, which dates to the Albian around 110 million years ago, rests unconformably on the Leziate Beds, which date to the Valanginian, over 130 million years ago, and the normally intervening Dersingham Beds are missing.
Blo' Norton and Thelnetham Fens	Thelnetham Fen	✓		21.3 hectares (53 acres)	YES	Diss; 52.370°N 0.961°E; TM 017 788	NCR, SAC,	Map (Note: This site is partly in Suffolk)	Citation	The site is designated mainly because of its open carr fen communities, although further interest is provided by areas of carr woodland and meadows. Calcareous fen flora include black bog rush, saw sedge, purple moor grass and fen orchid.
Booton Common	Booton Common	✓		8.2 hectares (20 acres)	YES	Norwich; 52.763°N 1.129°E; TG 112 230	NWT, SAC	Map	Citation	The common has diverse habitats, including wet calcareous fen grassland, acid heath, tall fen, alder woodland and a stream. Wet hollows are floristically rich and there are a variety of breeding birds.
Boughton Fen	Boughton Fen	✓		15.7 hectares (39 acres)	YES	King's Lynn; 52.583°N 0.534°E; TF 718 014		Map	Citation	This valley in a tributary of the River Wissey is covered by tall fen over most of the site, together with areas of scrub which provide a habitat for breeding birds. There are many uncommon species of moths, including the rare Perizoma sagittaria.
Bramerton Pits	Bramerton Pits		✓	0.7 hectares (1.7 acres)	YES	Norwich; 52.603°N 1.389°E; TG 296 060	GCR	Map	Citation	The site is composed of two disused gravel pits which are important for the study of the Lower Pleistocene. Bramerton Common Pit is the type site of the Norwich Crag Formation and Blakes Pit is the type site of the Bramertonian Stage. Both pits have yielded rich, mainly marine vertebrate fossils.
Breckland Farmland	Breckland Farmland	✓		13,394.0 hectares (33,097 acres)	PP	Brandon; 52.435°N 0.641°E; TL 796 852	SPA	Map	Citation	The site is designated an SSSI for its internationally important population of stone-curlews. These birds nest in March on bare ground in cultivated land with very short vegetation. Fields with sugar beet and vegetables and no recreational disturbance are preferred.
Breckland Forest	Breckland Forest	✓	✓	18,126.0 hectares (44,790 acres)	PP	Brandon; 52.452°N 0.680°E; TL 822 872	LNR, SPA	Map	Citation	The forest has breeding woodlarks and nightjars in internationally important numbers, and several nationally rare vascular plants and invertebrates on the IUCN Red List of Threatened Species. There are also geological sites which provide evidence of the environmental and human history of East Anglia during the Middle Pleistocene.
Breydon Water	Breydon Water	✓		514.4 hectares (1,271 acres)	PP	Great Yarmouth; 52.605°N 1.680°E; TG 493 072	LNR, Ramsar, RSPB, SPA	Map	Citation	This inland tidal estuary has large areas of mud at low tide, and it provides an ample food supply for migrating and wintering wildfowl and waders. There are nationally important numbers of several species of wintering wildfowl, including rare species.
Bridgham and Brettenham Heaths	Brettenham Heath	✓		439.9 hectares (1,087 acres)	YES	Norwich; 52.442°N 0.828°E; TL 923 864	NCR, NNR, SAC, SPA	Map	Citation	The dominant plants on this dry acidic heath are heather and wavy hair-grass. There are also areas of scrub and woodland. The site supports many species of breeding birds, including common curlews and nightjars.
The Brinks, Northwold	The Brinks, Northwold	✓		16.4 hectares (41 acres)	NO	Thetford; 52.528°N 0.586°E; TL 755 954		Map	Citation	These unimproved meadows have areas of tall herbs and grassland grazed by cattle and sheep. There are also areas of woodland and several ponds. More than 140 flowering plants have been recorded, including green-winged orchid, black knapweed and pepper saxifrage.
Briton's Lane Gravel Pit	Briton's Lane Gravel Pit		✓	21.5 hectares (53 acres)	NO	Sheringham; 52.926°N 1.225°E; TG 169 414	AONB, GCR	Map	Citation	This working quarry exposes gravel and sand derived from melting ice at the end of the Anglian glaciation around 425,000 years ago.
Broad Fen, Dilham	Broad Fen, Dilham	✓		38.4 hectares (95 acres)	NO	North Walsham; 52.774°N 1.471°E; TG 342 253	Ramsar, SAC, SPA	Map	Citation	This site's diverse habitats include fen, carr woodland, open water and fen meadows. The open water includes ponds which were dug to attract wildfowl, a stretch of the Dilham Canal and dykes. Aquatic plants include bladderwort and white water lily.
Broome Heath Pit	Broome Heath Pit		✓	1.2 hectares (3.0 acres)	YES	Bungay; 52.473°N 1.454°E; TM 347 917	GCR, LNR	Map	Citation	This site exposes rocks dating to the Wolstonian glaciation between around 350,000 and 130,000 years ago. It provides the only surviving exposure of the Broome Terrace, the flood plain of an ancient river. Ice wedges and fossils of Arctic flora and fauna indicate a tundra environment.
Bryant's Heath, Felmingham	Bryant's Heath	✓		17.7 hectares (44 acres)	YES	North Walsham; 52.814°N 1.349°E; TG 258 293		Map	Citation	Most of this site is dry acidic heath on glacial sands, but there are also areas of wet heath, fen and carr woodland. Several unusual mosses and lichens have been recorded in wetter areas.
Bure Broads and Marshes	Bure Broads and Marshes	✓		741.1 hectares (1,831 acres)	PP	Norwich; 52.690°N 1.473°E; TG 348 159	NCR, NNR NWT, Ramsar, SAC, SPA	Map	Citation	This is described by Natural England as a "nationally and internationally important wetland complex", which is situated on fenland peats in the floodplain of the River Bure. A notable feature is an extensive area of swamp alder carr on unstable peats and mud. There are a number of rare bird and butterfly species.
Burgh Common and Muckfleet Marshes	Burgh Common and Muckfleet Marshes	✓		121.5 hectares (300 acres)	FP	Great Yarmouth; 52.657°N 1.606°E; TG 440 127	Ramsar, SAC, SPA	Map	Citation	The Muck Fleet, a tributary of the River Bure, runs through this wetland site, which is traditionally managed by grazing and mowing. Habitats include tall fen, fen meadows and drainage dykes. There are rare plants and invertebrates, such as the swallowtail butterfly and the freshwater snail Anisus vorticulus.
Buxton Heath	Buxton Heath	✓		67.3 hectares (166 acres)	YES	Norwich; 52.749°N 1.220°E; TG 174 217	NCR, SAC	Map	Citation	This site has areas of dry acidic heath on glacial sands, but the main ecological interest lies in the mire along the valley of a small stream. There are a number of rare relict mosses, liverworts and fungi, together with some uncommon invertebrates.
Caistor St Edmund Chalk Pit	Caistor St Edmund Chalk Pit		✓	23.6 hectares (58 acres)	NO	Norwich; 52.595°N 1.306°E; TG 240 048	GCR	Map	Citation	This site provides the best exposure of the late Campanian Beeston Chalk, around 75 million years ago. It is very fossiliferous, with many molluscs and sea urchins.
Calthorpe Broad	Calthorpe Broad	✓		43.5 hectares (107 acres)	NO	Norwich; 52.777°N 1.573°E; TG 411 259	NCR, NNR, Ramsar, SAC, SPA	Map	Citation	This broad has diverse fauna and flora. Water plants include mare's-tail, water violet, blunt-leaved pondweed, spiked water-milfoil, floating scirpus, yellow water-lily and the nationally scarce water soldier.
Cantley Marshes	Cantley Marshes	✓		272.1 hectares (672 acres)	PP	Norwich; 52.582°N 1.497°E; TG 370 040	NNR, Ramsar, RSPB, SAC, SPA	Map	Citation	This site in the Yare valley is mainly species-rich grazing marsh with areas of wet alder carr and tall herb fen along the river bank. Invertebrates include two nationally rare dragonflies. The marshes have several important breeding bird species and an internationally important population of wintering wigeon.
Castle Acre Common	Castle Acre Common	✓		17.8 hectares (44 acres)	YES	King's Lynn; 52.703°N 0.666°E; TF 802 151		Map	Citation	This unimproved grazing marsh on the banks of the River Nar has diverse grassland habitats, and the marshy conditions provide nesting sites for several wetland bird species. There are acidic flushes where springs emerge from sands in the bottom of the valley.
Catton Grove Chalk Pit	Catton Grove Chalk Pit		✓	0.6 hectares (1.5 acres)	NO	Norwich; 52.649°N 1.292°E; TG 228 108	GCR	Map	Citation	This Cretaceous site exposes rocks dating to the late Campanian, around 75 million years ago, and it is the type site for the Catton Sponge Bed. Its well preserved fossils include many undescribed sponges and important ammonites.
Cawston and Marsham Heaths	Cawston and Marsham Heaths	✓		116.7 hectares (288 acres)	YES	Norwich; 52.767°N 1.214°E; TG 169 237		Map	Citation	These heaths are dominated by heather, and they have diverse flora including a rich variety of lichens. Many species of heathland birds breed on the site, including tree pipits, whinchats and nightjars.
Cockthorpe Common, Stiffkey	Cockthorpe Common	✓		7.1 hectares (18 acres)	YES	Wells-next-the-Sea; 52.947°N 0.952°E; TF 984 429	AONB	Map	Citation	This common in the valley of the River Stiffkey has a varied chalk grassland flora on steep slopes. Herbs are abundant, including salad burnet, dropwort, common rock-rose, large thyme and cowslip.
Coston Fen, Runhall	Coston Fen	✓		7.1 hectares (18 acres)	NO	Norwich; 52.618°N 1.043°E; TG 061 066	SAC	Map	Citation	This spring-fed site in the Yare valley has a variety of fen habitats, including a nationally rare calcareous mire community of fen flora. There are also areas of tall herbs, scrub and improved pasture.
Cranberry Rough, Hockham (Hockham Mere)	Cranberry Rough	✓	✓	81.1 hectares (200 acres)	PP	Thetford; 52.505°N 0.845°E; TL 932 935	GCR, LNR, NCR, SPA	Map	Citation	This former lake has swamp woodland, grassland, tall fen and a network of ditches and pools. It has a diverse range of wetland plants and insects, especially butterflies, dragonflies and damselflies. Large areas are covered with Sphagnum mosses.
Cranwich Camp	Cranwich Camp	✓		13.1 hectares (32 acres)	YES	Thetford; 52.516°N 0.613°E; TL 774 941	SAC, SPA	Map	Citation	This former army camp in the Breckland is now grassland, and it has a high value both entomologically and botanically. It has four Red Data Book insects and three Red Data Book plants. Rabbits help to maintain areas with diverse flora and invertebrates.
Crostwick Marsh	Crostwick Marsh	✓		11.6 hectares (29 acres)	YES	Norwich; 52.699°N 1.346°E; TG 262 165	Ramsar, SAC, SPA	Map	Citation	This marsh is in the valley of the Crostwick Beck, a tributary of the River Bure. It has areas of damp grassland, tall fen, species-rich fen grassland, alder carr, scrub and dykes. There is a variety of breeding marshland birds.
Damgate Marshes, Acle	Damgate Marshes	✓		64.7 hectares (160 acres)	FP	Norwich; 52.631°N 1.563°E; TG 412 096	Ramsar, SAC	Map	Citation	These traditionally managed grazing marshes and dykes are a nationally important wetland site. Their ecological significance lies mainly in the dykes, which have several uncommon water plants and a great diversity of aquatic invertebrates.
Decoy Carr, Acle	Decoy Carr, Acle	✓		56.0 hectares (138 acres)	NO	Norwich; 52.625°N 1.552°E; TG 405 090	Ramsar, SAC, SPA	Map	Citation	This area of wet carr woodland, fen, reedbeds and open water, is spring-fed. It has a number of rare Arctic–alpine mosses, such as Cinclidium stygium and Camptothecium nitens, which indicate only minor disturbance since the end of the last ice age. There is a network of dykes which have clear spring water and a variety of water plants.
Dereham Rush Meadow	Dereham Rush Meadow	✓		22.2 hectares (55 acres)	NO	Dereham; 52.689°N 0.919°E; TF 974 141		Map	Citation	This is an area of grassland and alder carr in the valley of a tributary of the River Wensum. The site has diverse habitats and it is traditionally maintained by grazing by horses. It is subject to flooding in winter.
Dersingham Bog	Dersingham Bog	✓	✓	159.1 hectares (393 acres)	YES	King's Lynn; 52.831°N 0.482°E; TF 673 288	AONB, GCR, NCR, NNR, Ramsar, SAC	Map	Citation	This is the largest and most intact acid valley mire in East Anglia, and it is of ornithological and entomological interest. Part of the site, Dersingham Pit, is important for establishing the rock sequence in the Lower Cretaceous in Norfolk.
Didlington Park Lakes	Stream from Didlington Park Lakes	✓		26.1 hectares (64 acres)	NO	Thetford; 52.536°N 0.619°E; TL 777 963		Map	Citation	These three artificial lakes probably date to the early nineteenth century. They are an important breeding site for wildfowl, including gadwall, teal, mallard, shoveler, tufted duck and great crested grebe.
Dillington Carr	Dillington Carr	✓		50.0 hectares (124 acres)	NO	Dereham; 52.704°N 0.914°E; TF 970 158		Map	Citation	This valley in a tributary of the River Wensum has extensive irrigation reservoirs and areas of carr woodland. An outstanding variety of birds breed on the site, including gadwalls, great crested grebe and tufted ducks on the reservoirs and barn owls, lesser spotted woodpeckers and willow tit in the woodland.
Ducan's Marsh	Ducan's Marsh	✓		3.6 hectares (8.9 acres)	NO	Norwich; 52.572°N 1.450°E; TG 339 027	Ramsar, SAC, SPA	Map	Citation	This unimproved area of wet grassland is in the valley of Carleton Beck, a small tributary of the River Yare. There are species rich fen and fen grassland communities in areas around springs on the side of the valley. The grassland is maintained by light summer grazing and it has a number of uncommon plants.
East Harling Common	East Harling Common	✓		15.1 hectares (37 acres)	YES	Norwich; 52.453°N 0.939°E; TL 998 879		Map	Citation	The importance of this site lies in its pingos, periglacial ground ice depressions, and it has many scarce species of beetles. There are also areas of chalk grassland and floristically rich fen.
East Runton Cliffs	East Runton Cliffs		✓	20.6 hectares (51 acres)	YES	Cromer; 52.938°N 1.271°E; TG 199 429	GCR	Map	Citation	The foreshore exposes Lower Pleistocene sediments, including large blocks of glacitectonic (transported by ice) chalk. There are many fossils, including extinct horse, rhinoceros, and elephant.
East Ruston Common	East Ruston Common	✓		39.5 hectares (98 acres)	YES	Norwich; 52.799°N 1.473°E; TG 342 280		Map	Citation	This is an area of unimproved fen, heath and carr woodland in the valley of a tributary of the River Ant. it is the only known English locality for the rare spider, Acanthophyma gowerensis, and it also has another nationally rare spider, Hygrolycosa rubrofasciata.
East Walton and Adcock's Common	East Walton Common	✓	✓	62.4 hectares (154 acres)	YES	King's Lynn; 52.715°N 0.569°E; TF 736 161	GCR, SAC	Map	Citation	These commons have periglacial depressions separated by chalk ridges. The habitats include chalk grassland, springs, open water and scrub. The grasses and herbs are diverse with up to thirty-two species per square metre, and the rich invertebrate fauna includes seven Red Data Book and seventy-nine nationally rare species.
East Winch Common	East Winch Common	✓		26.1 hectares (64 acres)	YES	King's Lynn; 52.713°N 0.515°E; TF 700 158	NWT	Map	Citation	This site is mainly wet acid heath on peat, and it is dominated by heather and cross-leaved heath. There are many wet hollows, which have diverse fen and mire flora, and areas of young woodland.
East Wretham Heath	East Wretham Heath	✓		141.1 hectares (349 acres)	YES	Thetford; 52.458°N 0.808°E; TL 909 882	NCR, NWT, SAC, SPA	Map	Citation	The principal ecological interest of this site lies in areas of Breckland grassland and two meres, which are supplied by ground water, and fluctuate irregularly. These conditions have led to unusual plants communities which are tolerant of alternate wetting and drying, such as reed canary grass and amphibious bistort.
Eaton Chalk Pit	Fence around Eaton Chalk Pit	✓		0.2 hectares (0.49 acres)	NO	Norwich; 52.610°N 1.261°E; TG 209 064		Map	Citation	These former chalk mines are used by hibernating bats and the site has been monitored over a long period for research into bat ecology. Up to 40 bats use the mines and the main species are Daubenton's, Natterer's and brown long-eared bats.
Edgefield Little Wood	Edgefield Little Wood	✓		5.3 hectares (13 acres)	YES	Melton Constable; 52.863°N 1.129°E; TG 107 341		Map	Citation	This is coppice with standards ancient woodland on acidic sands and gravels. Oaks which have been coppiced in the past have stools which are so tall that the wood resembles high forest. It is surrounded by ancient boundary banks.
Elm Road Field, Thetford	Elm Road Field	✓		5.0 hectares (12 acres)	YES	Thetford; 52.340°N 0.731°E; TL 859 815		Map	Citation	This area of open space has grassland with a rich flora. There are a number of uncommon plants, including the nationally endangered field wormwood and the nationally scarce sickle medick and tower mustard. There are two mature Scots pine hedges.
Felbrigg Woods	Felbrigg Woods	✓		164.6 hectares (407 acres)	YES	Norwich; 52.913°N 1.262°E; TG 194 400	AONB, NCR, NT, RHPG	Map	Citation	Ancient trees in this wood have more than fifty species of lichen, including several which are rare in East Anglia. Many of them are indicators of ancient undisturbed woodland. The trees are mainly beech which have been pollarded many years ago, and have massive stools and boles.
Field Barn Heaths, Hilborough	Field Barn Heaths, Hilborough	✓		17.9 hectares (44 acres)	NO	Thetford; 52.581°N 0.682°E; TF 818 015	SAC, SPA	Map	Citation	This light sandy grassland site is maintained by rabbit grazing and it has a rich variety of flora. There are also areas of ungrazed grassland and oak and hawthorn woodland.
Flordon Common	Flordon Common	✓		9.9 hectares (24 acres)	YES	Norwich; 52.529°N 1.215°E; TM 182 972	SAC	Map	Citation	Springs emerge from this chalk valley of the River Tas, resulting in a species-rich calcareous fen, including the very rare narrow-mouthed whorl snail. On higher ground there is chalk grassland, which is traditionally managed by grazing, allowing the survival of many locally rare plants.
Forncett Meadows	Forncett Meadows	✓		5.2 hectares (13 acres)	FP	Norwich; 52.488°N 1.187°E; TM 165 926		Map	Citation	This site in the valley of the River Tas has a variety of grassland types due to variations in soil and wetness and a long history of management by non-intensive grazing. There are also ponds and areas of scrub and alder woodland.
Foulden Common	Foulden Common	✓		139.0 hectares (343 acres)	YES	Thetford; 52.570°N 0.596°E; TF 760 001	NCR, SAC	Map	Citation	This common has a mosaic of habitats, such as acidic and calcareous grassland, birch woodland, rich fen and open water. Flora in the fen grassland include purple moor-grass, black bog rush, purple small-reed and blunt-flowered rush.
Foxley Wood	Foxley Wood	✓		124.2 hectares (307 acres)	YES	Dereham; 52.761°N 1.043°E; TG 054 225	NCR, NNR, NWT	Map	Citation	This is the largest area of ancient woodland in the county. The flora is diverse, with more than 250 species recorded, and invertebrates include several rare butterflies, such as the purple emperor and white admiral.
Fritton Common, Morningthorpe	Fritton Common, Morningthorpe	✓		20.5 hectares (51 acres)	YES	Norwich; 52.482°N 1.272°E; TM 223 921		Map	Citation	This damp acidic meadow common is traditionally managed by light cattle grazing. Scattered ancient trees have a wide variety of epiphytic lichens, including some which are locally rare. There are a number of natural ponds with diverse invertebrate fauna.
Gawdyhall Big Wood, Harleston	Gawdyhall Big Wood Harleston	✓		29.8 hectares (74 acres)	NO	Harleston; 52.416°N 1.307°E; TM 250 849		Map	Citation	This ancient wood on poorly drained chalky boulder clay has coppiced hornbeam, ash and hazel with oak standards. The ground flora is especially diverse around the hornbeams and on wet rides.
Geldeston Meadows	Geldeston Meadows	✓		14.0 hectares (35 acres)	NO	Beccles; 52.470°N 1.526°E; TM 396 916	Ramsar, SAC, SPA	Map	Citation	These traditionally managed meadows in the flood plain of the River Waveney have a very diverse flora. Most of the site is wet grassland which is dominated by sweet vernal grass, common quaking grass and crested dog's-tail.
Glandford (Hurdle Lane)	Glandford (Hurdle Lane)		✓	9.4 hectares (23 acres)	NO	Holt; 52.932°N 1.053°E; TG 053 415	AONB, GCR	Map	Citation	This is a working quarry in the valley of the River Glaven. It has a complex sequence of deposits formed by Pleistocene glaciers, with till, lacustrine calcareous silts, sands and coarse gravels, which throw light on the glacial history of the area.
Glandford (Letheringsett Road)	Glandford (Letheringsett Road)		✓	1.1 hectares (2.7 acres)	NO	Holt; 52.928°N 1.037°E; TG 042 410	AONB, GCR	Map	Citation	This site is important because it has mounds of gravel and till which can help to show whether the North Norfolk till plain is the result of Pleistocene glacial deposition or is the residue of the erosion of a former more extensive area of gravel.
Gooderstone Warren	Gooderstone Warren	✓		21.6 hectares (53 acres)	NO	Thetford; 52.577°N 0.645°E; TF 793 010	SAC, SPA	Map	Citation	This sandy site has soils which range from acid to calcareous, resulting in a variety of grassland types. There is a pit at the north end which has flora including cowslips and the uncommon purple milk vetch.
Great Cressingham Fen	Great Cressingham Fen	✓		14.3 hectares (35 acres)	NO	Thetford; 52.586°N 0.725°E; TF 847 022	SAC	Map	Citation	This calcareous spring-fed valley has a variety of vegetation types, ranging from dry unimproved grassland on high slopes to tall fen where the springs emerge at the valley bottom. There is a diverse range of flora, including some uncommon species. Plants in the valley bottom include water mint and southern marsh orchid.
Great Yarmouth North Denes	Great Yarmouth North Denes	✓		100.8 hectares (249 acres)	YES	Great Yarmouth; 52.632°N 1.737°E; TG 530 104	NCR, SPA	Map	Citation	These beaches have a complete succession of dune vegetation types, from foredunes to very extensive dry acid dune grassland. The site has the largest breeding colony of little terns in Britain.
Grime's Graves	Grime's Graves	✓	✓	66.1 hectares (163 acres)	YES	Brandon; 52.478°N 0.670°E; TL 814 900	GCR, SAC, SM, SPA	Map	Citation	This Breckland heath site has diverse plant communities. In the northern part there are parallel strips of heather and acid grassland, which are thought to have been formed periglacially during the last glacial period. Five species of bat use re-excavated Neolithic flint mines for winter roosting.
Grimston Warren Pit	Grimston Warren Pit		✓	6.7 hectares (17 acres)	NO	King's Lynn; 52.771°N 0.479°E; TF 673 222	GCR	Map	Citation	This former quarry is described by Natural England as "a nationally important site for dating the constituent facies of the Lower Cretaceous in north Norfolk". It has yielded ammonites which date to the Hauterivian age around 130 million years ago.
Gunton Park Lake	Gunton Park Lake	✓		18.3 hectares (45 acres)	NO	Norwich; 52.862°N 1.296°E; TG 220 345		Map	Citation	This artificial lake has the largest flock of post-breeding gadwall in Britain, and more than 500 birds have sometimes been recorded in September. Wintering wildfowl include teal, mallard, shoveler, shelduck and goosander.
Hall Farm Fen, Hemsby	Hall Farm Fen, Hemsby	✓		9.2 hectares (23 acres)	YES	Great Yarmouth; 52.693°N 1.669°E; TG 480 169	Ramsar, SAC, SPA	Map	Citation	This area of unimproved fen grassland and dykes is grazed by horses and cattle. It has diverse flora, including many orchids. The dykes have a rich variety of aquatic plants and invertebrates, including the nationally rare freshwater snail Segmentina nitida.
Halvergate Marshes	Halvergate Marshes	✓		1,432.7 hectares (3,540 acres)	PP	Norwich; 52.588°N 1.608°E; TG 445 050	LNR, Ramsar, RSPB, SAC, SPA	Map	Citation	These traditionally managed grazing marshes have a system of intersecting dykes, and they have a wide variety of aquatic ditch communities, including pondweeds of international importance. There are many bird species, with wintering Bewick's swans in internationally important numbers.
Happisburgh Cliffs	Happisburgh Cliffs		✓	6.1 hectares (15 acres)	YES	Happisburgh; 52.826°N 1.533°E; TG 381 312	GCR	Map	Citation	These cliffs are unique as they display three glacial deposits, from the 1.9 million year old Pre-Pastonian Stage to the Beestonian and the Cromer Tills of the Anglian stage 450,000 years ago, the most severe ice age of the Pleistocene.
Hardley Flood	Hardley Flood	✓		49.8 hectares (123 acres)	YES	Norwich; 52.542°N 1.508°E; TM 380 996	Ramsar, SAC, SPA	Map	Citation	This area of tidal lagoons and reedbeds provides a spillway for the River Chet. The reedbeds provide nesting sites for birds, including nationally important populations of several breeding birds. Three rare flies have been recorded, Elachiptera uniseta, Elachiptera scrobiculata and Lonchoptera scutellata.
Heacham Brick Pit	Heacham Brick Pit		✓	0.8 hectares (2.0 acres)	NO	King's Lynn; 52.899°N 0.495°E; TF 679 364	GCR	Map	Citation	This is the only site which gives access to examine the Lower Cretaceous Snettisham Clay. It has Lower Barremian ammonite fossils, dating to around 130 million years ago.
Hedenham Wood	Hedenham Wood	✓		23.4 hectares (58 acres)	NO	Bungay; 52.499°N 1.406°E; TM 313 945		Map	Citation	Most of this ancient wood on boulder clay is hornbeam coppice with oak standards, but the wet valley bottom has ash, maple and elm. The diverse ground flora includes some uncommon species.
Hilgay Heronry	Hilgay Heronry	✓		1.8 hectares (4.4 acres)	NO	Downham Market; 52.566°N 0.411°E; TL 635 992		Map	Citation	This small wood has a nationally important breeding colony of grey herons, with around forty nests each year in larch and ash trees. Nearby drainage dykes on The Fens provide feeding grounds.
Hockering Wood	Hockering Wood	✓		89.5 hectares (221 acres)	NO	Dereham; 52.687°N 1.064°E; TG 072 143		Map	Citation	This is one of the largest areas of ancient, semi-natural woodland in the county. It has many rare species, especially of bryophytes, and there are ponds which have populations of great crested newts, a protected species under the Wildlife and Countryside Act 1981.
Holkham Brick Pit	Holkham Brickpits		✓	0.5 hectares (1.2 acres)	NO	Wells-next-the-Sea; 52.950°N 0.770°E; TF 862 428	AONB, GCR	Map	Citation	According to Natural England, this is the best site displaying the Hunstanton Till, a glacial deposit dating the last glacial period, between 115,000 and 11,700 years ago. This is the furthest the ice reached in East Anglia during the Last Glacial Maximum, around 26,000 years ago.
Holly Farm Meadow, Wendling	Holly Farm Meadow, Wendling	✓		2.6 hectares (6.4 acres)	NO	Dereham; 52.680°N 0.862°E; TF 936 130		Map	Citation	This meadow in the valley of the River Wensum has a line of calcareous springs which supports fen grassland which has diverse flora. The unimproved meadow is maintained by seasonal grazing. There are also areas of tall fen and dry grassland with many anthills.
Holt Lowes	Holt Lowes	✓		49.9 hectares (123 acres)	YES	Holt; 52.894°N 1.101°E; TG 087 374	NCR, SAC	Map	Citation	This site is mainly dry and sandy heath in the valley of the River Glaven, with a mire along a tributary which runs through the heath. Ground flora includes wood horsetail at its only known location in East Anglia.
Honeypot Wood	Honeypot Wood	✓		9.5 hectares (23 acres)	YES	Dereham; 52.692°N 0.857°E; TF 932 143	NWT	Map	Citation	This is an ancient coppiced wood on calcareous soil. It has a rich ground layer, which is dominated by dog's mercury, and other flora include greater butterfly-orchid and broad-leaved helleborine. A total of 208 plant species have been recorded.
Hooks Well Meadows, Great Cressingham	Hooks Well Meadows, Great Cressingham	✓		15.6 hectares (39 acres)	NO	Thetford; 52.577°N 0.710°E; TF 837 011		Map	Citation	This site has a long history of traditional management. The diverse habitats include fen meadow, herb-rich wet grassland, acidic flushes, dry calcareous grassland and wet alder woodland, which has carpets of Sphagnum mosses.
Horningtoft Wood	Horningtoft Wood	✓		8.3 hectares (21 acres)	NO	Dereham; 52.776°N 0.887°E; TF 948 237		Map	Citation	This ancient coppice with standards wood on boulder clay has exceptionally diverse ground flora with several rare species. There are scattered mature oaks and the main coppiced species are hazel, ash and maple. The ground flora is dominated by dog's mercury on heavy soils and bramble on lighter ones.
Horse Wood, Mileham	Horse Wood	✓		7.1 hectares (18 acres)	NO	King's Lynn; 52.731°N 0.844°E; TF 921 186		Map	Citation	This is an ancient coppice with standards wood on boulder clay, and the ground flora is diverse with several rare species. There are wide and wet rides which have plants such as herb paris, valerian and water mint.
Hunstanton Cliffs	Hunstanton Cliffs	✓	✓	4.6 hectares (11 acres)	YES	Hunstanton; 52.949°N 0.493°E; TF 676 420	GCR	Map	Citation	These eroding cliffs expose a mid-Cretaceous sequence from the Albian to the succeeding Cenomanian around 100 million years ago, with exceptionally rich Albian ammonite fossils. Biological interest is provided by a colony of breeding fulmars on the cliff face.
Hunstanton Park Esker	Hunstanton Park Esker		✓	17.3 hectares (43 acres)	NO	Hunstanton; 52.939°N 0.521°E; TF 695 409	AONB, GCR	Map	Citation	This is a 1.5-kilometre (1-mile) esker, a long winding ridge of stratified sand and gravel dating to the glacial Devensian period, between 115,000 and 11,700 years ago. This is an uncommon landform in central and southern England.
Islington Heronry	Islington Heronry	✓		1.3 hectares (3.2 acres)	NO	King's Lynn; 52.718°N 0.320°E; TF 568 159		Map	Citation	This stand of mature oaks has the largest breeding colony of grey herons in the county, with about eighty nests occupied each year. There are several other populations of woodland birds, such as the great spotted woodpecker.
Kelling Heath	Kelling Heath	✓		89.4 hectares (221 acres)	YES	Holt; 52.932°N 1.125°E; TG 101 418	AONB,	Map	Citation	The heath is described by Natural England as "a fine example of oceanic heathland". The vegetation is typical of dry, acid heath and is dominated by heather, bell heather, western gorse, gorse and bracken, with areas of mixed woodland. The dry conditions are favourable to reptiles such as common lizard and adder.
Kenninghall and Banham Fens with Quidenham Mere	Kenninghall and Banham Fens with Quidenham Mere	✓		48.4 hectares (120 acres)	NO	Norwich; 52.448°N 1.000°E; TM 040 876		Map	Citation	This site in the valley of the River Whittle has a lake, tall fen, wet woodland and calcareous grassland. Springs feed an area of fen grassland dominated by purple moor grass, blunt-flowered rush and black bog-rush.
Leet Hill, Kirby Cane	Leet Hill, Kirby Cane		✓	6.5 hectares (16 acres)	NO	Bungay; 52.482°N 1.504°E; TM 380 929	GCR	Map	Citation	This is a quarry which has a sequence of deposits dating to the Middle Pleistocene, with the base of gravels laid down by a confluence of rivers, with glacial gravels above, and then a sequence of chalky sands probably also laid down by glaciers.
Leziate, Sugar and Derby Fens	Sugar Fen	✓		87.9 hectares (217 acres)	YES	King's Lynn; 52.754°N 0.518°E; TF 700 204		Map	Citation	These fens have extensive heaths and areas of wet acidic grassland, and there are smaller areas of damp woodland and species-rich calcareous grassland. There are many ant-hills on Derby Fen.
Limpenhoe Meadows	Limpenhoe Meadows	✓		12.0 hectares (30 acres)	NO	Norwich; 52.573°N 1.537°E; TG 398 031	Ramsar, SAC, SPA	Map	Citation	This area of unimproved fen grassland in the valley of the River Yare has a network of dykes. The soils vary from alluvial clays in the valley bottom to poorly drained peats higher up. The meadows are species-rich with some uncommon plants. Aquatic plants in the dykes include the nationally rare sharp-leaved pondweed.
Lower Wood, Ashwellthorpe	Lower Wood, Ashwellthorpe	✓		37.9 hectares (94 acres)	YES	Norwich; 52.538°N 1.153°E; TM 139 980	NWT	Map	Citation	This ancient wood on chalky boulder clay has a diverse ground flora with uncommon species such as wood spurge, early-purple orchid, common twayblade, ramsons, water avens and woodruff.
Ludham - Potter Heigham Marshes	Ludham – Potter Heigham Marshes	✓		101.5 hectares (251 acres)	PP	Great Yarmouth; 52.705°N 1.561°E; TG 407 179	NCR, NNR, Ramsar, SAC, SPA	Map	Citation	This is described by Natural England as "both a nationally important wetland site and one of the richest areas of traditionally managed grazing marsh and dykes now remaining in Broadland". The principal conservation lies in the aquatic flora and fauna of the dykes, especially the dragonflies.
Mattishall Moor	Mattishall Moor	✓		5.5 hectares (14 acres)	NO	Dereham; 52.665°N 0.996°E; TG 027 117		Map	Citation	This area of calcareous fen and marshy grassland has a rich variety of flora. Black bog-rush, blunt-flowered rush and purple moor-grass are common in the fen areas, and purple moor-grass is also abundant in the grassland, together with other plants such as yellow rattle and marsh pennywort.
Middle Harling Fen	Middle Harling Fen	✓		11.8 hectares (29 acres)	NO	Norwich; 52.429°N 0.923°E; TL 988 852		Map	Citation	This calcareous valley fen has several springs and a wide variety of types of grassland, including both wet and dry communities. There are uncommon flora such as adder's tongue and yellow rattle, and the breeding birds are diverse.
Morston Cliff	Morston Cliff		✓	1.0 hectare (2.5 acres)	YES	Wells-next-the-Sea; 52.957°N 0.961°E; TF 990 441	AONB, GCR, NNR, NT	Map	Citation	This key Pleistocene site has the only interglacial deposit of a raised beach in East Anglia. It is believed to be Ipswichian, dating to around 125,000 years ago, and is overlain by glacial deposits of the late Devensian Hunstanton Till.
Mundesley Cliffs	Mundesley Cliffs		✓	29.3 hectares (72 acres)	YES	North Walsham; 52.869°N 1.452°E; TG 324 358	AONB, GCR	Map	Citation	The cliffs on this site display some of the best marine and freshwater deposits dating to the Cromerian interglacial, and to the early stages of the succeeding Anglian glaciation, which started around 478,000 years ago.
Narborough Railway Embankment	Narborough Railway Embankment	✓		7.9 hectares (20 acres)	PL	King's Lynn; 52.671°N 0.593°E; TF 754 113	NWT	Map	Citation	This nineteenth-century embankment is probably the most ecologically diverse chalk grassland site in the county, with many flowering plants which attract a wide range of butterflies. There is also a variety of mosses and molluscs.
New Buckenham Common	New Buckenham Common	✓		20.9 hectares (52 acres)	YES	Norwich; 52.475°N 1.080°E; TM 093 908	NWT	Map	Citation	This unimproved grassland is traditionally managed by grazing. It has the largest colony of green-winged orchids in the county, and there are a stream and pool which have aquatic plants.
North Norfolk Coast	North Norfolk Coast	✓	✓	7,862.3 hectares (19,428 acres)	PP	King's Lynn; 52.971°N 0.815°E; TF 891 452	AONB, GCR, NCR, NNR, NT, NWT, RSPB, Ramsar, SAC, SPA	Map	Citation	This large site has a range of coastal habitats, including the best coastal marshes in Britain and among the finest in Europe. The breeding birds are of international importance, including one twelfth of the world population of sandwich terns and the largest colony in western Europe of little terns.
Old Bodney Camp	Old Bodney Camp	✓		32.8 hectares (81 acres)	NO	Thetford; 52.557°N 0.725°E; TL 848 990	SPA	Map	Citation	This area of heath is maintained by rabbit grazing. It has some areas of grassland and others dominated by lichen and moss. There are two nationally rare moths, Noctua orbona and Scopula rubiginata, which are almost confined to the Breckland region.
Old Buckenham Fen	Old Buckenham Fen	✓		34.5 hectares (85 acres)	PP	Attleborough; 52.487°N 1.013°E; TM 047 919		Map	Citation	This valley fen has cattle grazed wet meadows, species rich reedbeds, a mere and dykes. Flora in wetter areas include ragged robin, marsh thistle and ladies smock.
Ouse Washes	Ouse Washes	✓		2,513.6 hectares (6,211 acres)	PP	Ely; 52.469°N 0.192°E; TL 490 879	GCR, NCR, Ramsar, SAC, SPA, WWT	Map (Note: This site is partly in Cambridgeshire)	Citation	The Washes are internationally significant for wintering and breeding wildfowl and waders, especially teal, pintails, wigeons, shovelers, pochards and Bewick's swans. The site also has rich aquatic fauna and flora, and areas of unimproved grassland.
Overstrand Cliffs	Overstrand Cliffs	✓	✓	57.8 hectares (143 acres)	YES	Cromer; 52.924°N 1.325°E; TG 236 415	AONB, GCR, SAC	Map	Citation	These soft cliffs are subject to falls and slumping, providing a habitat for species associated with disturbance such as the rare beetles Bledius filipes, Harpalus vernalis and Nebria livida. The cliff is geologically important for its succession of Pleistocene glacial exposures.
Paston Great Barn	Paston Great Barn	✓		1.0 hectare (2.5 acres)	NO	North Walsham; 52.858°N 1.448°E; TG 322 345	AONB, NNR SAC, SM	Map	Citation	This medieval barn has one of the few maternity colonies in Britain of barbastelle bats. This species is listed as a rare and threatened species in the British and European IUCN Red Lists of Threatened Species. The barn also has colonies of several other bats.
Poplar Farm Meadows, Langley	Poplar Farm Meadows, Langley	✓		7.5 hectares (19 acres)	NO	Norwich; 52.565°N 1.495°E; TG 370 021	Ramsar, SAC, SPA	Map	Citation	This calcareous fen on the edge of the flood plain of the River Yare is spring-fed. It is managed by light summer grazing and the flora is diverse, with some uncommon species. There are also areas of tall fen and the site is crossed by dykes which have clear spring water and a variety of aquatic plants.
Potter and Scarning Fens, East Dereham	Scarning Fen	✓		6.2 hectares (15 acres)	YES	Dereham; 52.669°N 0.930°E; TF 982 120	NCR, NWT, SAC	Map	Citation	These are valleys with calcareous fens on peat with an exceptionally diverse flora, including uncommon mosses and liverworts. Insects include the nationally rare small red damselfly.
Potter's Carr, Cranworth	Potter's Carr, Cranworth	✓		6.3 hectares (16 acres)	NO	Thetford; 52.598°N 0.922°E; TF 980 040		Map	Citation	This area of alder carr and wet pasture is on the bank of the River Blackwater. The diverse flora of the carr is typical of ancient woodland, with plants such as dog's mercury and moschatel. Wintering birds include water rails.
Priory Meadows, Hickling	Priory Meadows, Hickling	✓		23.9 hectares (59 acres)	NO	Norwich; 52.771°N 1.579°E; TG 415 253	Ramsar, SAC, SPA	Map	Citation	This grassland on damp and acidic peat soil is managed traditionally, and it has a rich and diverse flora with herbs such as tormentil and marsh cinquefoil. There is also a network of dykes with aquatic plants.
Pulham Market Big Wood	Pulham Market Big Wood	✓		4.7 hectares (12 acres)	YES	Diss; 52.459°N 1.244°E; TM 205 895		Map	Citation	This ancient coppice wood on boulder clay is probably the last fragment of a much larger area of woodland. The standard trees are mature pedunculate oaks and the coppice layer is very overgrown. The ground flora is dominated by bramble, honeysuckle and bracken.
Redgrave and Lopham Fens	Redgrave and Lopham Fens	✓		127.0 hectares (314 acres)	YES	Diss; 52.376°N 1.001°E; TM 049 796	NCR, NNR Ramsar SAC, SWT	Map	Citation	This spring-fed valley at the head of the River Waveney has several different types of fen vegetation. There are aquatic plants such as bladderwort, fen pondweed and Charophytes, all of which are indicators of low levels of pollution. The site has the only known British population of fen raft spiders.
Ringstead Downs	Ringstead Downs	✓		6.9 hectares (17 acres)	YES	Hunstanton; 52.931°N 0.514°E; TF 691 400	AONB, NWT	Map	Citation	This is a dry chalk valley which was carved out by glacial meltwaters. It is species-rich as it has never been ploughed, and it is the largest surviving area of chalk downland surviving in the county. The butterflies are diverse.
River Nar	River Nar	✓		212.3 hectares (525 acres)	PP	King's Lynn; 52.711°N 0.682°E; TF 813 160		Map	Citation	The upper Nar has 78 river and bankside species of plants, including 5 pondweeds and 8 bryophytes. The lower reaches which flow through a flood plain are more sluggish. The most common fish are brown trout, pike, roach and eel.
River Wensum	River Wensum	✓		386.0 hectares (954 acres)	PP	Dereham; 52.766°N 0.967°E; TG 003 228	SAC	Map	Citation	This river has been selected by Natural England as an example of an enriched, calcareous lowland river running through a relatively natural corridor. It has a rich invertebrate fauna and more than 100 species of flora. The SSSI also includes two tributaries, the River Tat and the Langor Drain.
Rosie Curston's Meadow, Mattishall	Rosie Curston's Meadow	✓		2.3 hectares (5.7 acres)	NO	Dereham; 52.669°N 1.017°E; TG 041 122		Map	Citation	This unimproved calcareous clay meadow is managed by cattle grazing. It has over sixty grass species and a rich variety of herbs, including green-winged orchid, adder's tongue, bee orchid, twayblade and yellow rattle.
Roydon Common	Roydon Common	✓		194.9 hectares (482 acres)	YES	King's Lynn; 52.773°N 0.498°E; TF 686 224	NCR, NNR, NWT, Ramsar, SAC	Map	Citation	The common is described by Natural England as "one of the best examples in Britain of a lowland mixed valley mire". It has diverse habitats, including wet acid heath, calcareous fen and dry heath on acid sands. There are rare plants, birds and insects, including the black darter dragonfly.
Scoulton Mere	Scoulton Mere	✓		34.2 hectares (85 acres)	NO	Norwich; 52.573°N 0.929°E; TF 986 013		Map	Citation	The principal ecological interest of this site lies in the swamp, fen and bog flora on islands in the mere and along the shore. The largest island, called Scoulton Heath, is mainly covered in Sphagnum moss, and other plants include the nationally rare crested buckler fern.
Sea Mere, Hingham	Sea Mere, Hingham	✓		36.3 hectares (90 acres)	NO	Norwich; 52.570°N 1.001°E; TG 035 011		Map	Citation	This site has a natural lake together with areas of fen, grazing marsh and woodland. The fen has a rich variety of flora including saw sedge, marsh pennywort, yellow loosestrife, yellow iris and the rare green figwort.
Setchey	Setchey		✓	33.4 hectares (83 acres)	NO	King's Lynn; 52.691°N 0.413°E; TF 632 131	GCR	Map	Citation	This site throws light on sea level changes in the Holocene, the period since the end of the last ice age, 11,700 years ago. It is part of a network of Fenland sites which allows correlation across the area.
Sexton Wood	Sexton Wood	✓		39.0 hectares (96 acres)	NO	Bungay; 52.474°N 1.382°E; TM 298 916	NCR	Map	Citation	This ancient wood on boulder clay is mainly coppice with standards, but there are some areas of high forest. The ground flora is diverse, with dog's mercury dominant and other plants such as ramsons and early-purple orchid.
Shallam Dyke Marshes, Thurne	Shallam Dyke Marshes	✓		69.8 hectares (172 acres)	NO	Great Yarmouth; 52.694°N 1.550°E; TG 400 166	Ramsar, SAC, SPA	Map	Citation	This is grazing marsh in the valley of the River Thurne, and it is important for waders such as lapwings, oystercatchers and common snipe. There are a variety of water plants such as the rare water soldier.
Shelfanger Meadows	Shelfanger Meadows	✓		10.3 hectares (25 acres)	NO	Diss; 52.403°N 1.099°E; TM 109 828		Map	Citation	This site in the valley of a tributary of the River Waveney is described by Natural England as "one of the most important areas of unimproved grassland in Norfolk". It has been traditionally managed by a hay cut followed by grazing for hundreds of years, and as a result its flora is rich, including uncommon species. There are also areas where springs make the grassland marshy.
Sheringham and Beeston Regis Commons	Sheringham Common	✓		24.9 hectares (62 acres)	YES	Sheringham; 52.934°N 1.219°E; TG 164 422	AONB, NCR SAC	Map	Citation	These commons have areas of dry heathland which have several species of breeding birds and reptiles, and wet fen in low-lying areas where there are springs. Calcareous mires have uncommon plants such as butterwort and bog pimpernel.
Shotesham Common	Shotesham Common	✓		21.6 hectares (53 acres)	YES	Norwich; 52.549°N 1.302°E; TM 240 997		Map	Citation	This site consists of traditionally managed meadows with a variety of grassland types, ranging from permanently wet marshes on the valley bottom, where a stream runs through, to drier grassland on the slopes. There are several uncommon species of flora.
Shotesham-Woodton Hornbeam Woods	Shotesham Little Wood	✓		40.4 hectares (100 acres)	NO	Norwich; 52.516°N 1.324°E; TM 256 961		Map	Citation	This site is composed of four ancient coppice with standards hornbeam woods on boulder clay, Shotesham Little Wood, Saxlingham Grove, Hempnall Little Wood and Winter's Grove. The ground flora is rich with several uncommon species, such as herb paris, stinking iris and greater butterfly orchid.
Sidestrand and Trimingham Cliffs	Sidestrand and Trimingham Cliffs	✓	✓	133.9 hectares (331 acres)	YES	Norwich; 52.902°N 1.381°E; TG 275 392	AONB, GCR	Map	Citation	These crumbling cliffs expose both Pleistocene sediments and a rich assembly of invertebrate fossils dating to the late Cretaceous. There are several rare beetles and the Red Data Book parasitic herbaceous plant purple broomrape.
Smallburgh Fen	Smallburgh Fen	✓		7.6 hectares (19 acres)	YES	Norwich; 52.768°N 1.446°E; TG 326 245	NCR, Ramsar, SAC, SPA	Map	Citation	This spring-fed fen site is in the valley of a tributary of the River Ant. The diverse flora include several rare species, including the only known locality in the county for the moss Bracthythecium mildeanum. There is also an area of alder carr.
Snettisham Carstone Quarry	Snettisham Carstone Quarry	✓		11.0 hectares (27 acres)	NO	King's Lynn; 52.884°N 0.503°E; TF 685 348	AONB	Map	Citation	This is the only known location in Britain for the micro-moth Nothris verbascella. Its host plant, hoary mullein, is abundant in areas of the quarry which are no longer worked.
Southrepps Common	Southrepps Common	✓		5.6 hectares (14 acres)	YES	Norwich; 52.865°N 1.358°E; TG 261 350	LNR, SAC	Map	Citation	This is damp grassland and fen in the valley of the River Ant. There are several rare true flies characteristic of undisturbed wetlands, especially Pteromicra glabricula and Colobaea distincta, both of which have larvae which are parasitic on snails.
St James' Pit	St James' Pit		✓	3.5 hectares (8.6 acres)	YES	Norwich; 52.636°N 1.310°E; TG 241 094	GCR, LNR	Map	Citation	This site has been designated because of its fossils of two genera of mosasaurs, large marine reptiles dating to the Upper Cretaceous.
Stanford Training Area	Stanford Training Area	✓	✓	4,678.0 hectares (11,560 acres)	NO	Thetford; 52.513°N 0.754°E; TL 870 941	GCR, NCR SAC, SPA	Map	Citation	This site contains an extensive area of species-rich Breckland grassland and heath. Wetlands and pools have wildfowl and many rare invertebrates. Part of the site is the Devil's Punchbowl, which is geologically important for its deep depression formed by the collapse of Pleistocene glacial sands and boulder clays.
Stanley and Alder Carrs, Aldeby	Stanley and Alder Carrs, Aldeby	✓		42.7 hectares (106 acres)	NO	Beccles; 52.478°N 1.581°E; TM 433 927	Ramsar, SAC, SPA	Map	Citation	Most of this site is alder carr woodland next to the River Waveney, which is often flooded. It has a diverse insect fauna. There are also areas of open fen with plants including common reed, reed canary grass and hemp-agrimony.
Stiffkey Valley	Stiffkey Valley	✓		44.4 hectares (110 acres)	NO	Wells-next-the-Sea; 52.952°N 0.950°E; TF 983 435	AONB	Map	Citation	This valley has a range of wetland habitats in the floodplain of the River Stiffkey. It has many species of breeding birds, including nationally important populations of avocets. Wintering wetland birds include bitterns, brent geese and garganeys, while marsh harriers and barn owls hunt throughout the year.
Swangey Fen, Attleborough	Swangey Fen	✓		48.4 hectares (120 acres)	PP	Attleborough; 52.499°N 0.964°E; TM 013 931	SAC	Map	Citation	Part of this site is spring-fed fen with diverse flora, including grass of Parnassus, marsh helleborine and several rare mosses. The fen is surrounded by wet woodland and grassland.
Swannington Upgate Common	Swannington Upgate Common	✓		20.5 hectares (51 acres)	YES	Norwich; 52.717°N 1.179°E; TG 148 180		Map	Citation	This site has varied habitats including glacial sands and gravels, peat, dry and wet heath, woodland, grassland, ponds and a stream. There is a wide range of breeding birds.
Swanton Novers Woods	Swanton Novers Wood	✓		83.0 hectares (205 acres)	NO	Melton Constable; 52.844°N 0.979°E; TG 007 316	NCR, NNR	Map	Citation	These ancient woods are almost certainly of primary origin, and they are regarded as one of the most important groups of woods in the country. The trees and ground flora are exceptionally diverse, and they include the nationally rare may lily.
Sweetbriar Road Meadows, Norwich	Briar Road Meadows	✓		9.7 hectares (24 acres)	NO	Norwich; 52.640°N 1.262°E; TG 208 097		Map	Citation	These unimproved meadows in the valley of the River Wensum are permanently waterlogged, and they are grazed by ponies. Herbs include yellow rattle, ragged robin, cuckoo flower and southern marsh orchid.
Syderstone Common	Syderstone Common	✓		43.7 hectares (108 acres)	YES	King's Lynn; 52.852°N 0.716°E; TF 830 317	NWT	Map	Citation	The common has heath and grassland areas in the valley of the River Tat. Pools on sand and gravel provide suitable habitats for five species of breeding amphibians, including the nationally rare natterjack toad.
Thetford Golf Course and Marsh	Thetford Golf Course	✓		122.3 hectares (302 acres)	PP	Thetford; 52.420°N 0.712°E; TL 845 837	NCR, SAC, SPA	Map	Citation	Dry grass heath covers much of this site but there are also areas of lichen and heather, with a diverse flora including uncommon plants. Horse Meadows has wet peaty areas have fenland plants and alder woodland.
Thompson Water, Carr and Common	Thompson Water	✓		154.7 hectares (382 acres)	YES	Thetford; 52.524°N 0.842°E; TL 929 956	LNR, NCR, NWT, SAC	Map	Citation	This grassland site in the valley of a tributary of the River Wissey has a number of pingos, damp and water filled depressions formed by the melting of ice at the end of the last glaciation. It also has a lake called Thompson Water which, together with its surrounding reed swamp, is important for breeding birds.
Tindall Wood, Ditchingham	Tindall Wood	✓		42.2 hectares (104 acres)	NO	Bungay; 52.489°N 1.426°E; TM 327 934		Map	Citation	This is one of the largest hornbeam woods in Norfolk. It is ancient coppice with standards, and the standards are oak, ash and hornbeam, and there are several uncommon species in the ground flora.
Trinity Broads	Trinity Broads	✓		316.8 hectares (783 acres)	PP	Great Yarmouth; 52.676°N 1.643°E; TG 464 149	SAC	Map	Citation	The site is composed of five interconnected lakes in a side valley of the River Bure, together with reed swamp, wet woodland and fen. There are nationally important numbers of breeding wildfowl, and several nationally rare invertebrates, such as the swallowtail butterfly and two Red Data Book flies.
Upper Thurne Broads and Marshes	Upper Thurne Broads and Marshes	✓		1,185.9 hectares (2,930 acres)	PP	Norwich; 52.734°N 1.605°E; TG 435 212	AONB, NCR, NNR NWT, Ramsar, SAC, SPA	Map	Citation	This is one of the finest wetland complexes in Britain, and it is internationally important for its wetland plant communities and associated animal species. It has four lakes, Hickling Broad, Heigham Sound, Horsey Mere and Martham Broad, together with smaller water bodies, swamp, fen, woodland and grazing marsh.
Upton Broad and Marshes	Upton Broad and Marshes	✓		195.4 hectares (483 acres)	YES	Norwich; 52.668°N 1.536°E; TG 392 137	NCR, NWT, Ramsar, SAC, SPA	Map	Citation	This is described by Natural England as "an outstanding example of unreclaimed wetland and grazing marsh". Its rich invertebrate fauna includes eighteen species of freshwater snail, and an outstanding variety of dragonflies and damselflies, including the nationally rare Norfolk hawker.
Warham Camp	Warham Camp	✓		5.1 hectares (13 acres)	YES	Wells-next-the-Sea; 52.929°N 0.889°E; TF 943 408	AONB, SM	Map	Citation	This unimproved chalk grassland site is heavily grazed by rabbits and cattle. It has diverse herb species such as common rock-rose and squinancywort, and butterflies including the chalkhill blue.
The Wash	The Wash	✓		62,045.6 hectares (153,318 acres)	PP	Spalding; 52.937°N 0.286°E; TF 537 402	AONB, NCR, NNR, Ramsar, RSPB, SAC, SPA	Map (Note: This site is partly in Lincolnshire)	Citation	The Wash is very important as a breeding ground for common seals, and it is also very significant for wintering waders and wildfowl which feed on its rich supply of invertebrates. Saltmarshes provide birds with valuable breeding grounds.
Wayland Wood, Watton	Wayland Wood	✓		31.7 hectares (78 acres)	YES	Thetford; 52.560°N 0.838°E; TL 925 996	NCR, NWT	Map	Citation	This semi-natural wood on wet calcareous boulder clay is managed by coppicing. Breeding birds include woodcocks, lesser spotted woodpeckers and nuthatches.
Weeting Heath	Weeting Heath	✓		141.8 hectares (350 acres)	PL	Brandon; 52.465°N 0.586°E; TL 758 884	NCR, NNR, NWT, SAC, SPA	Map	Citation	This grass and lichen heath is grazed by rabbits. It has a high density of breeding birds, including stone-curlews. One arable field is reserved for uncommon Breckland plants.
Wells Chalk Pit	Wells Chalk Pit	✓	✓	4.0 hectares (9.9 acres)	YES	Wells-next-the-Sea; 52.949°N 0.870°E; TF 929 429	AONB, GCR	Map	Citation	This quarry has chalk grassland with large populations of orchids in areas which have not been worked for many years. The site is also geologically important as it exposes the glacial deposits of the Marly Drift till, which was formerly believed to date to the Anglian glaciation, but may belong to the more recent Wolstonian ice age.
West Runton Cliffs	West Runton Cliffs		✓	17.8 hectares (44 acres)	YES	Cromer; 52.941°N 1.253°E; TG 187 431	GCR	Map	Citation	The cliffs are important because they expose a succession of warm and cold stages in the middle Pleistocene between about 2 million and 400,000 years ago. They show a succession of advances and retreats of the sea, and the site is the stratotype for the Cromerian Stage.
Westwick Lakes	Westwick Lakes	✓		9.8 hectares (24 acres)	NO	Norwich; 52.794°N 1.371°E; TG 274 272		Map	Citation	Many wildfowl over-winter on these five man-made lakes, which have unusual aquatic flora. Plants on the lake margins include lesser reedmace, soft rush and sweet flag.
Weybourne Cliffs	Weybourne Cliffs	✓	✓	40.9 hectares (101 acres)	YES	Sheringham; 52.946°N 1.173°E; TG 133 435	AONB, GCR	Map	Citation	This Pleistocene site is the type locality for the Pastonian Weybourne Crag Formation, and its fossils of marine molluscs have been studied for 200 years. Its ecological interest lies in colonies of sand martins in the cliffs.
Weybourne Town Pit	Weybourne Town Pit		✓	0.7 hectares (1.7 acres)	YES	Holt; 52.943°N 1.145°E; TG 114 430	AONB, GCR	Map	Citation	This is the type locality for the Pleistocene 'Marly Drift'. This is a chalk-rich glacial till thought to have been deposited during the Anglian stage around 450,000 years ago, but its relationship to other deposits in the area is disputed.
Whitwell Common	Whitwell Common	✓		19.4 hectares (48 acres)	YES	Norwich; 52.741°N 1.089°E; TG 086 204		Map	Citation	This common in the valley of a tributary of the River Wensum has diverse wetland flora on peat soils. There are also areas of wet alder woodland, fen and unimproved grassland, with grasses such as sheep's fescue and Yorkshire fog.
Wiggenhall St Germans	Wiggenhall St Germans		✓	5.2 hectares (13 acres)	YES	King's Lynn; 52.699°N 0.349°E; TF 588 138	GCR	Map	Citation	This site provides evidence for sea level changes during the Quaternary period, the last 2.6 million years. There are three peat layers, interspersed with fine-grained clastic rocks, and they have been studied with pollen and foraminifera analyses.
Winterton-Horsey Dunes	Winterton-Horsey Dunes	✓	✓	427.0 hectares (1,055 acres)	YES	Great Yarmouth; 52.733°N 1.678°E; TG 484 214	AONB, GCR, NCR, NNR, SAC, SPA	Map	Citation	This site has extensive dunes together with areas of grazing marsh and birch woodland. Invertebrates include a rare amphibian and a rare butterfly. The site is geologically important as it displays the processes which control dynamic dune development.
Wiveton Downs	Wiveton Downs	✓	✓	28.9 hectares (71 acres)	PP	Holt; 52.944°N 1.012°E; TG 025 428	AONB, GCR, LNR	Map	Citation	This is a classic example of an esker, a glacial crevasse which has been filled in until it forms a narrow winding ridge. It has been very important for teaching, research and demonstration.
Wretham Park Meres	Wretham Park Meres	✓		30.0 hectares (74 acres)	NO	Thetford; 52.491°N 0.807°E; TL 907 918		Map	Citation	This site consists of four natural lakes, Mickle Mere, Hill Mere, Rush Mere and West Mere, which provide a breeding habitat for wildfowl such as mallards, gadwalls, shovelers, tufted ducks and teal. There are also many wintering ducks.
Wretton	Wretton		✓	20.6 hectares (51 acres)	PP	King's Lynn; 52.565°N 0.483°E; TL 684 992	GCR	Map	Citation	This site exposes layer across the transition between the warm Ipswichian and the colder Devensian around 115,000 years ago. It has the richest assemblage of early Devensian vertebrate fossils in Britain, including arctic fox, bison and woolly rhinoceros.
Yare Broads and Marshes	Yare Broads and Marshes	✓		744.5 hectares (1,840 acres)	PP	Norwich; 52.602°N 1.448°E; TG 336 061	NCR, NNR, Ramsar, RSPB, SAC, SPA	Map	Citation	This is a nationally important wetland site, with grazing marsh, open water, fen, carr woodland and peat. There are many nationally rare plants and many birds including nationally important wintering flocks of wigeon.

== See also ==
- List of Local Nature Reserves in Norfolk
- National Nature Reserves in Norfolk

== Sources ==
- Ratcliffe, Derek, ed. (1977). A Nature Conservation Review. Vol. 2. Cambridge, UK: Cambridge University Press. ISBN 978-0-521-21403-2.
