= Damgate Marshes, Acle =

UK Site of Special Scientific Interest

Coordinates: 52.631°N 1.563°E

- Site of Special Scientific Interest
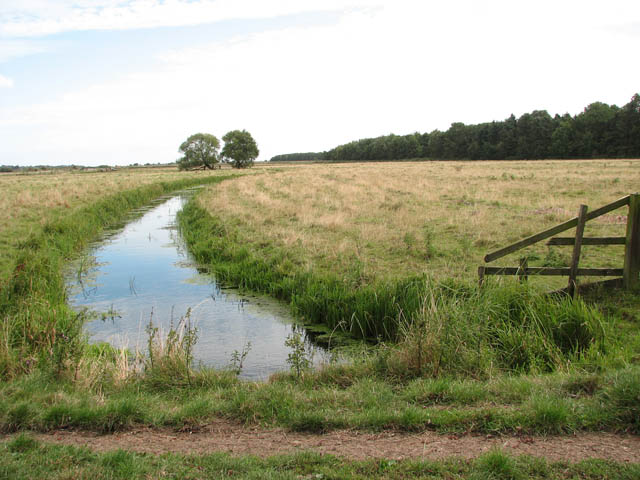
- Location of Damgate Marshes, Acle.
- Area of search: Norfolk
- Grid reference: TG 412 096
- Interest: Biological
- Area: 64.7 hectares (160 acres)
- Notification date: 1993
- Location map: Magic Map

Damgate Marshes, Acle is a 64.7-hectare (160-acre) biological Site of Special Scientific Interest between Norwich and Great Yarmouth in Norfolk, England. It is part of the Broadland Ramsar site and The Broads Special Area of Conservation.

These traditionally managed grazing marshes and dykes are a nationally important wetland site. Their ecological significance lies mainly in the dykes, which have several uncommon water plants and a great diversity of aquatic invertebrates.

The Weavers' Way footpath goes through the site.
