= East Walton and Adcock's Common =

UK Site of Special Scientific Interest

Coordinates: 52.715°N 0.569°E

- Site of Special Scientific Interest
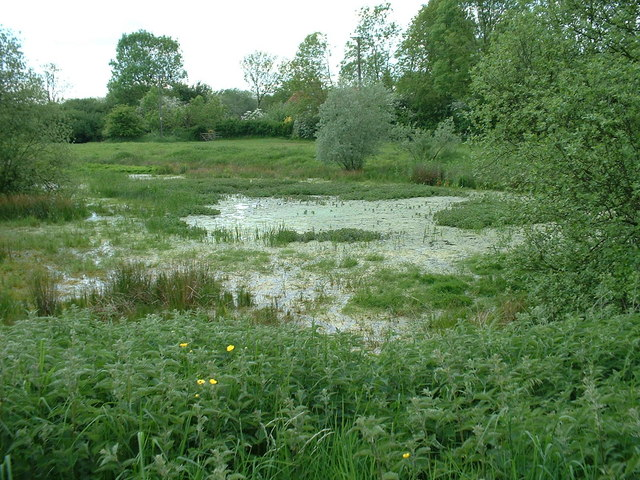
- Location of East Walton and Adcock's Common.
- Area of search: Norfolk, England
- Grid reference: TF 736 161
- Interest: Biological; Geological
- Area: 62.4 hectares (154 acres)
- Notification date: 1995
- Location map: Magic Map

East Walton and Adcock's Common is a 62.4-hectare (154-acre) biological and geological Site of Special Scientific Interest south-east of King's Lynn in Norfolk, England. It is a Geological Conservation Review site and part of Norfolk Valley Fens Special Area of Conservation

These commons have periglacial depressions separated by chalk ridges. The habitats include chalk grassland, springs, open water and scrub. The grasses and herbs are diverse with up to thirty-two species per square metre, and the rich invertebrate fauna includes seven Red Data Book and seventy-nine nationally rare species.
