= East Harling Common =

UK Site of Special Scientific Interest

Coordinates: 52.453°N 0.939°E

- Site of Special Scientific Interest
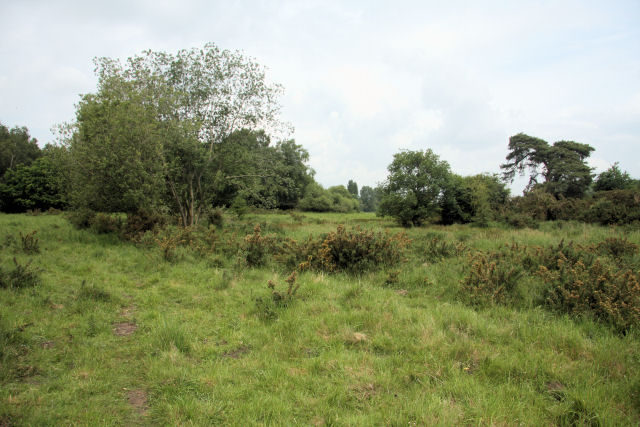
- Location of East Harling Common.
- Area of search: Norfolk
- Grid reference: TL 998 879
- Interest: Biological
- Area: 15.1 hectares (37 acres)
- Notification date: 1989
- Location map: Magic Map

East Harling Common is a 15.1-hectare (37-acre) biological Site of Special Scientific Interest east of Thetford in Norfolk, England.

The importance of this site lies in its pingos, periglacial ground ice depressions, and it has many scarce species of beetles. There are also areas of chalk grassland and floristically rich fen.
