= Castle Acre Common =

Protected area in Norfolk, England

Coordinates: 52.703°N 0.666°E

- Site of Special Scientific Interest
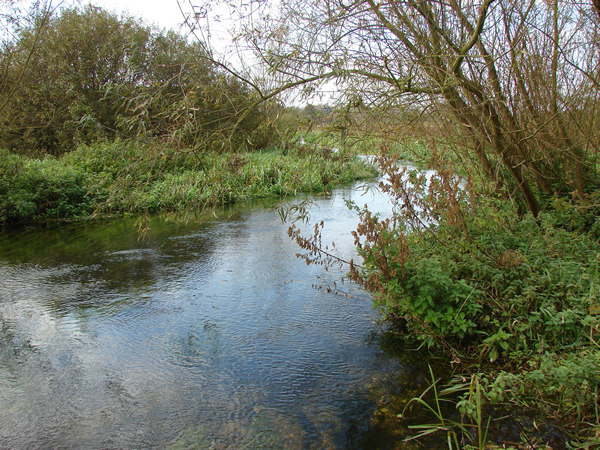
- Location of Castle Acre Common.
- Area of search: Norfolk
- Grid reference: TF 802 151
- Interest: Biological
- Area: 17.8 hectares (44 acres)
- Notification date: 1990
- Location map: Magic Map

Castle Acre Common is a 17.8-hectare (44-acre) biological Site of Special Scientific Interest east of King's Lynn in Norfolk, England.

This unimproved grazing marsh on the banks of the River Nar has diverse grassland habitats, and the marshy conditions provide nesting sites for several wetland bird species. There are acidic flushes where springs emerge from sands in the bottom of the valley.

There is access from the Nar Valley Way.

== Land ownership ==
All land within Castle Acre Common SSSI is owned by the local authority
