= Leet Hill, Kirby Cane =

UK Site of Special Scientific Interest

Coordinates: 52.482°N 1.504°E

- Site of Special Scientific Interest
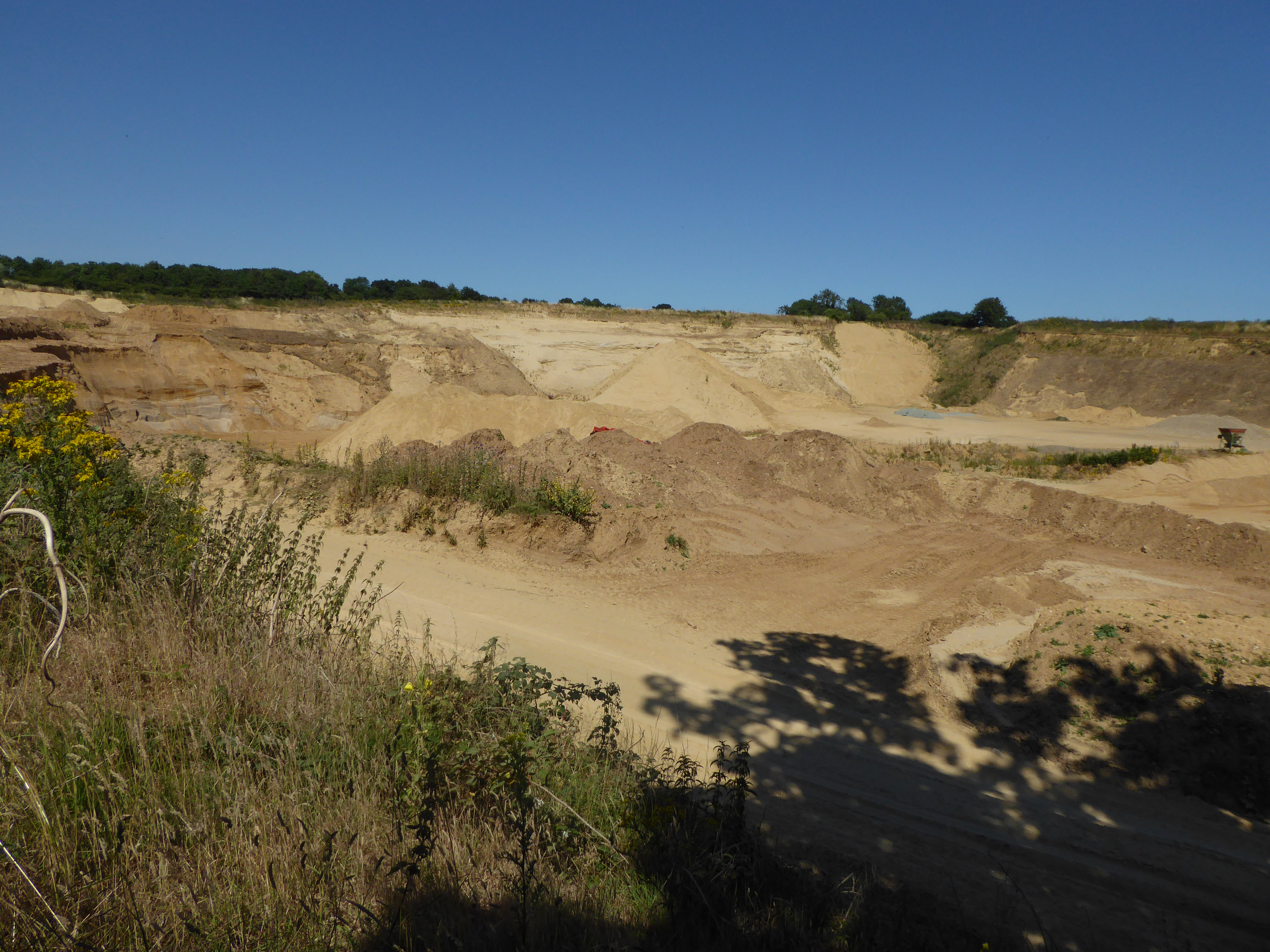
- Location of Leet Hill, Kirby Cane.
- Area of search: Norfolk, England
- Grid reference: TM 380 929
- Interest: Geological
- Area: 6.5 hectares (16 acres)
- Notification date: 1994
- Location map: Magic Map

Leet Hill, Kirby Cane is a 6.5-hectare (16-acre) geological Site of Special Scientific Interest in Kirby Cane in Norfolk, England. It is a Geological Conservation Review site.

This is a quarry which has a sequence of deposits dating to the Middle Pleistocene, with the base of gravels laid down by a confluence to two rivers, above that glacial gravels, and then a sequence of chalky sands probably also laid down by glaciers.

The site is a working quarry and there is no public access.
