= Setchey SSSI =

Protected area in Norfolk, England

Coordinates: 52.691°N 0.413°E

- Site of Special Scientific Interest
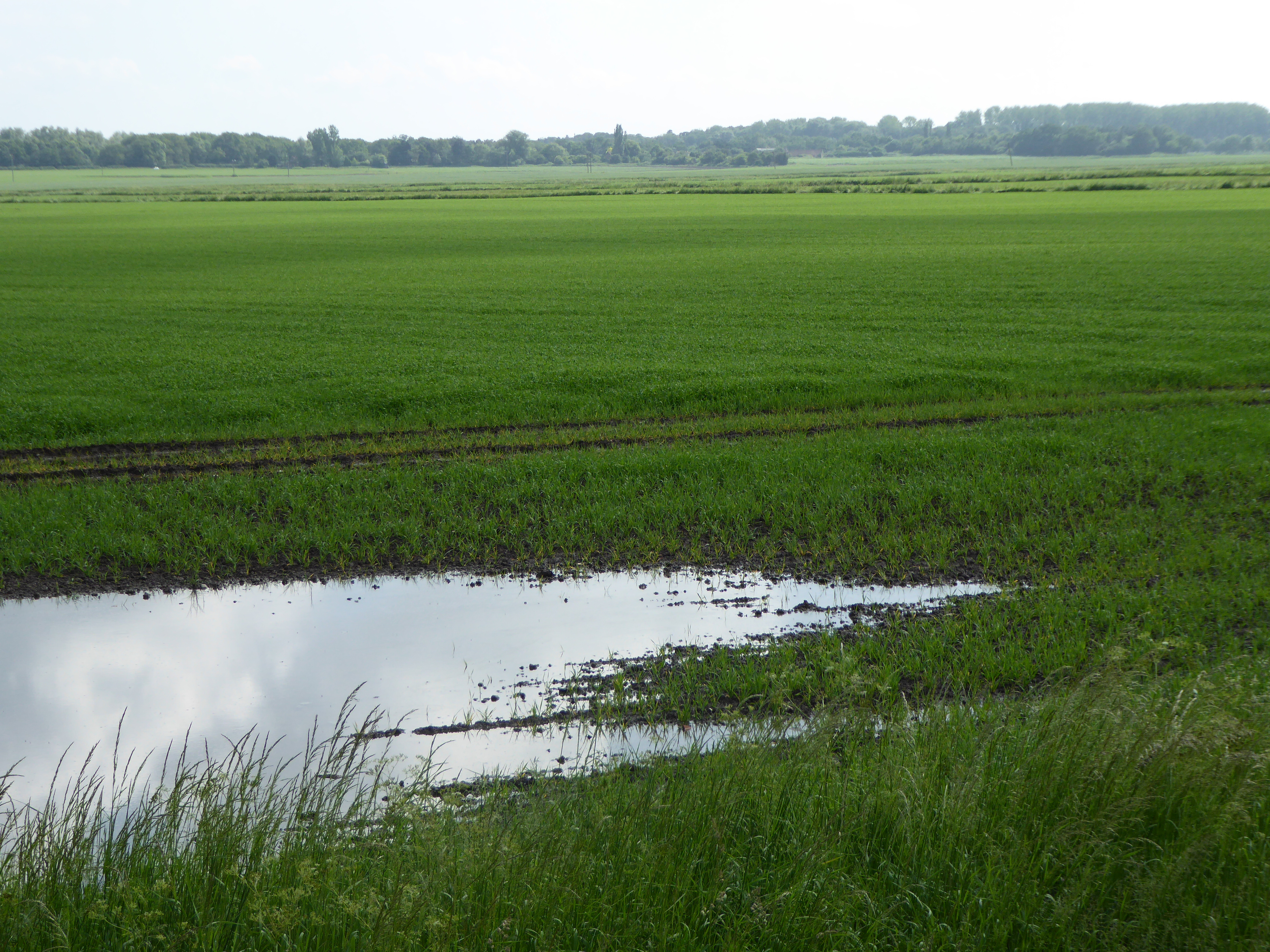
- Location of Setchey SSSI.
- Area of search: Norfolk, England
- Grid reference: TF 632 131
- Interest: Geological
- Area: 33.4 hectares (83 acres)
- Notification date: 1993
- Location map: Magic Map

Setchey SSSI is a 33.4-hectare (83-acre) geological Site of Special Scientific Interest south of King's Lynn in Norfolk, England. It is a Geological Conservation Review site.

This site throws light on sea level changes in the Holocene, the period since the end of the last ice age, 11,700 years ago. It is part of a network of Fenland sites which allows correlation across the area.

The site is private land with no public access.
