= Forncett Meadows =

UK Site of Special Scientific Interest

Coordinates: 52.488°N 1.187°E

- Site of Special Scientific Interest
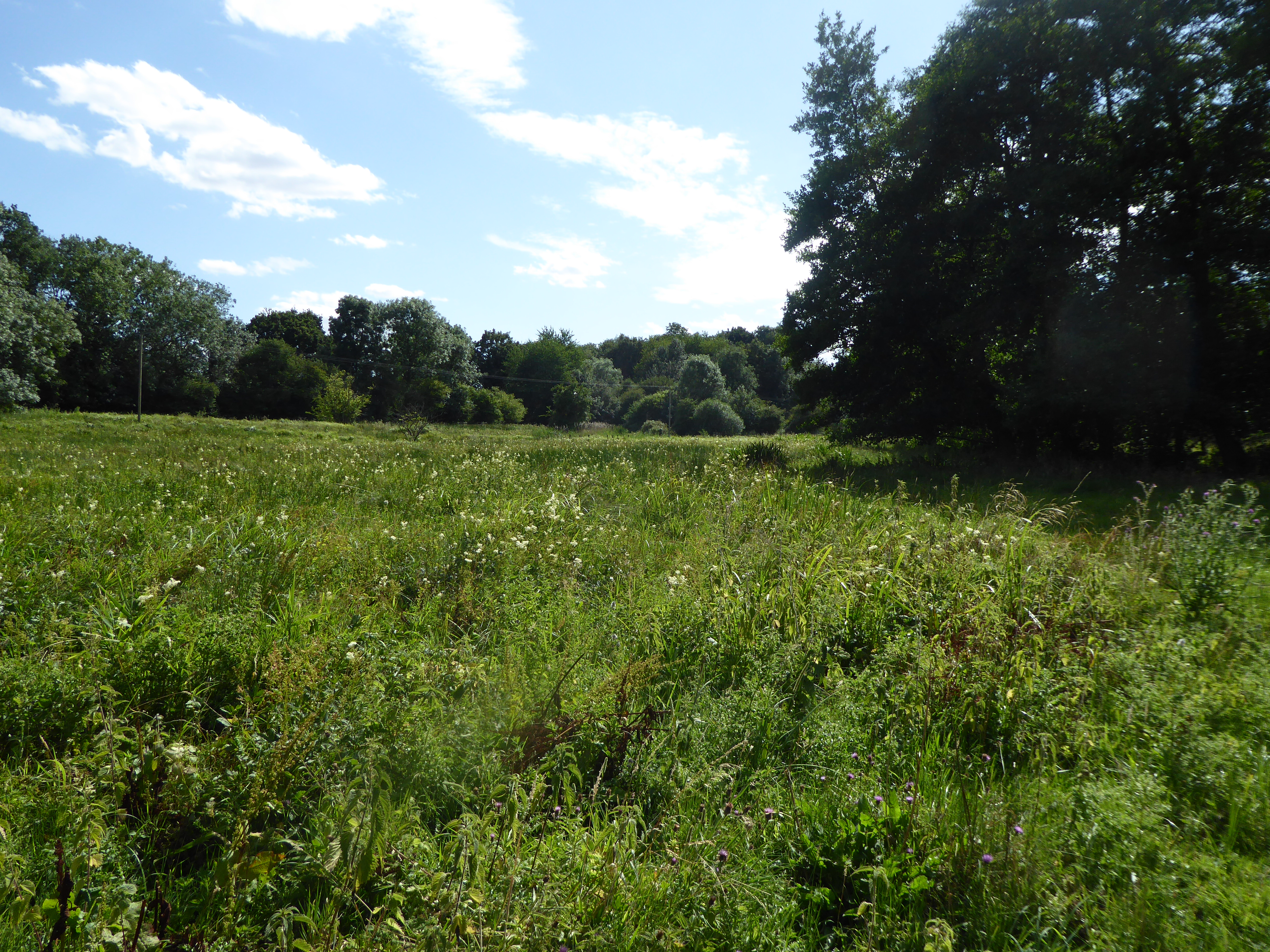
- Location of Forncett Meadows.
- Area of search: Norfolk
- Grid reference: TM 165 926
- Interest: Biological
- Area: 5.2 hectares (13 acres)
- Notification date: 1985
- Location map: Magic Map

Forncett Meadows is a 5.2-hectare (13-acre) biological Site of Special Scientific Interest west of Long Stratton in Norfolk, England.

This site in the valley of the River Tas has a variety of grassland types due to variations in soil and wetness and a long history of management by non-intensive grazing. There are also ponds and areas of scrub and alder woodland.

The site is private land but it can be viewed from a footpath which goes through it.
