= Heacham Brick Pit =

Protected area in Norfolk, England

Coordinates: 52.899°N 0.495°E

- Site of Special Scientific Interest
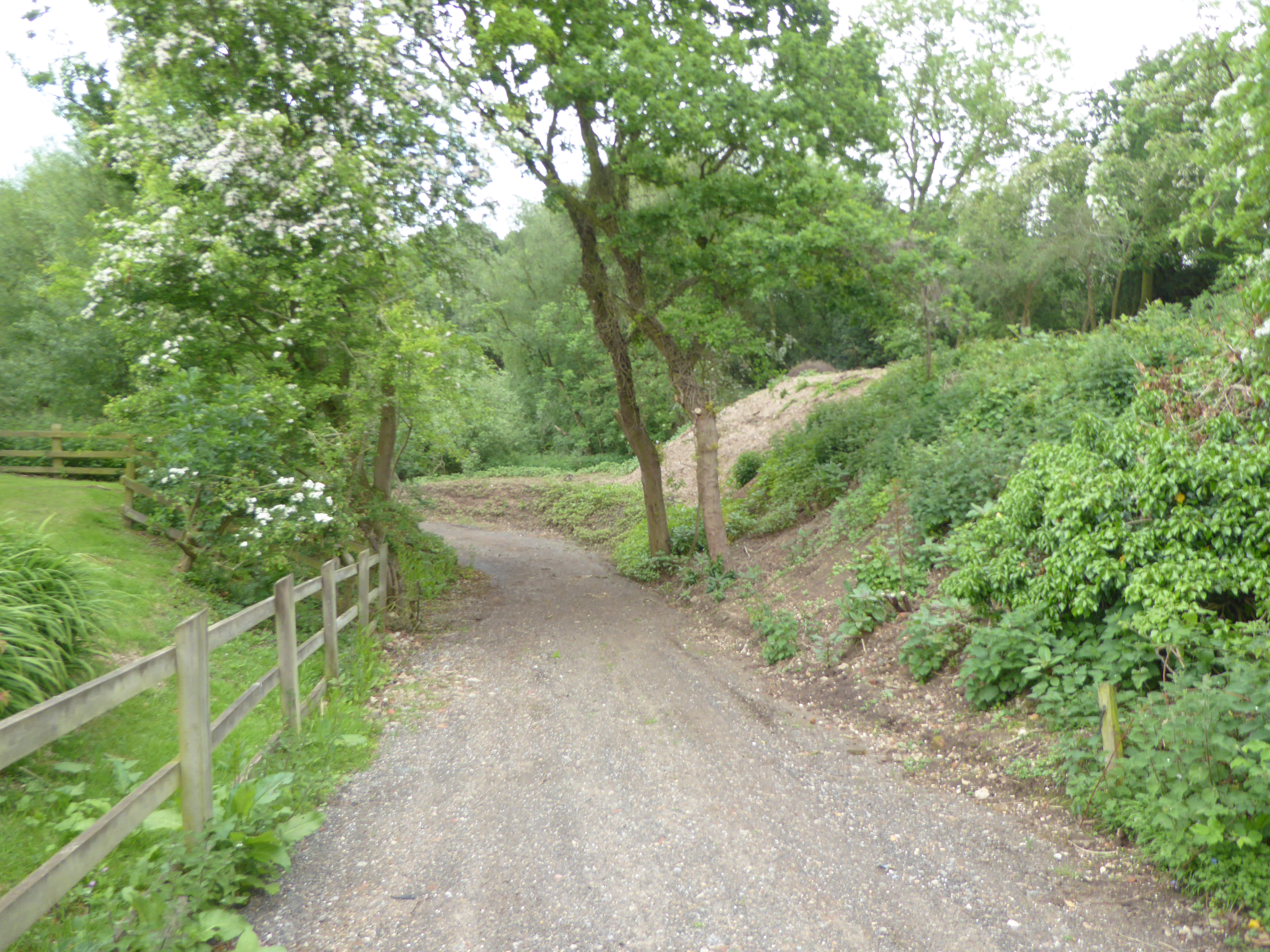
- Location of Heacham Brick Pit.
- Area of search: Norfolk, England
- Grid reference: TF 679 364
- Interest: Geological
- Area: 0.8 hectares (2.0 acres)
- Notification date: 1984
- Location map: Magic Map

Heacham Brick Pit is a 0.8-hectare (2.0-acre) geological Site of Special Scientific Interest in Heacham, north of King's Lynn in Norfolk, England. It is a Geological Conservation Review site.

This is the only site which gives access to examine the Lower Cretaceous Snettisham Clay. It has Lower Barremian ammonite fossils, dating to around 130 million years ago.

The site is private land with no public access.
