= Wretham Park Meres =

Protected area in Norfolk, England

Coordinates: 52.491°N 0.807°E

- Site of Special Scientific Interest
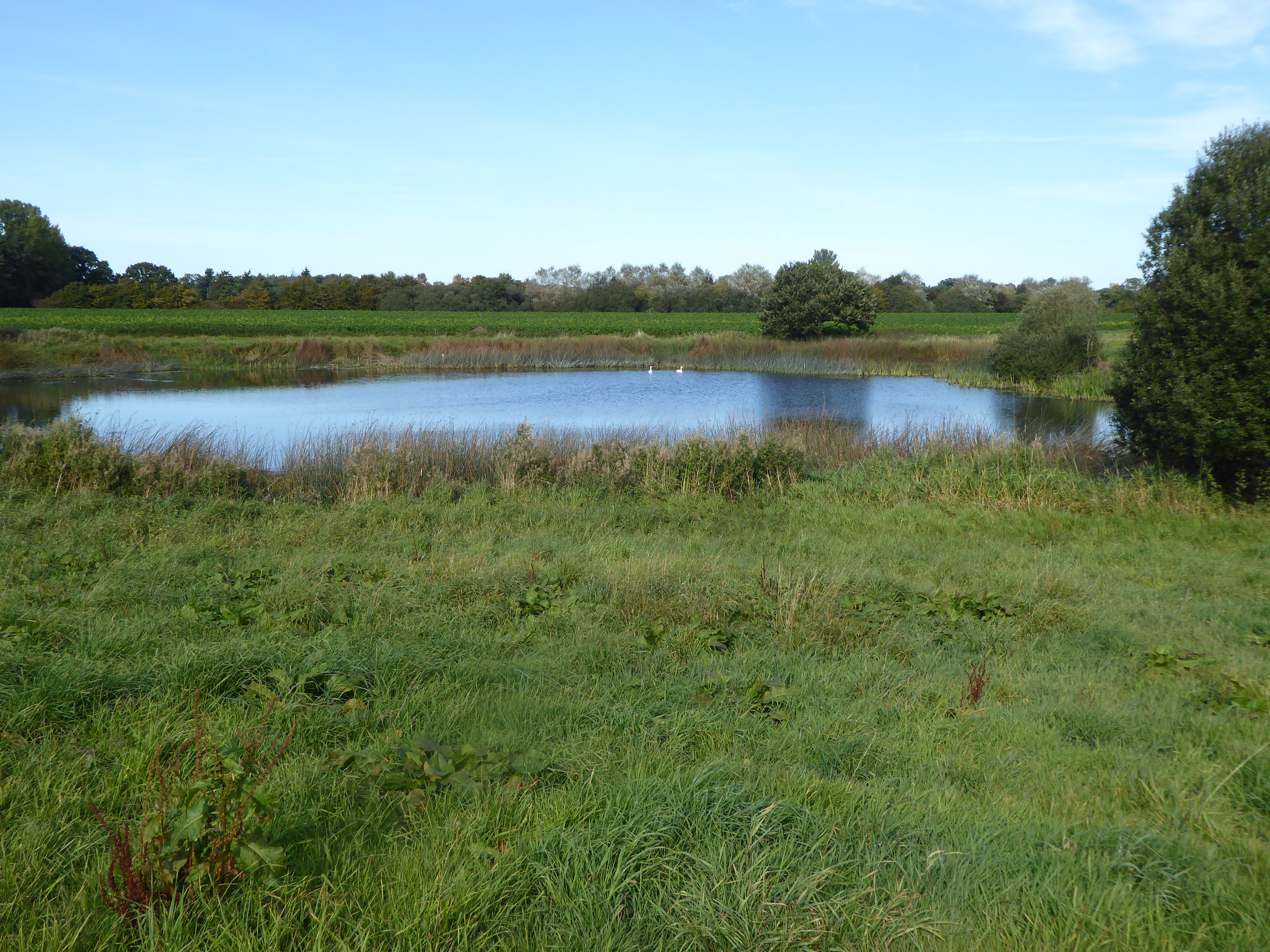
- West Mere
- Location of Wretham Park Meres.
- Area of search: Norfolk
- Grid reference: TL 907 918
- Interest: Biological
- Area: 30.0 hectares (74 acres)
- Notification date: 1984
- Location map: Magic Map

Wretham Park Meres is a 30-hectare (74-acre) biological Site of Special Scientific Interest north of Thetford in Norfolk, England.

This site consists of four natural lakes, Mickle Mere, Hill Mere, Rush Mere and West Mere, which provide a breeding habitat for wildfowl such as mallards, gadwalls, shovelers, tufted ducks and teal. There are also many wintering ducks.

The site is private land with no public access.
