= Fritton Common, Morningthorpe =

UK Site of Special Scientific Interest

Coordinates: 52.482°N 1.272°E

- Site of Special Scientific Interest
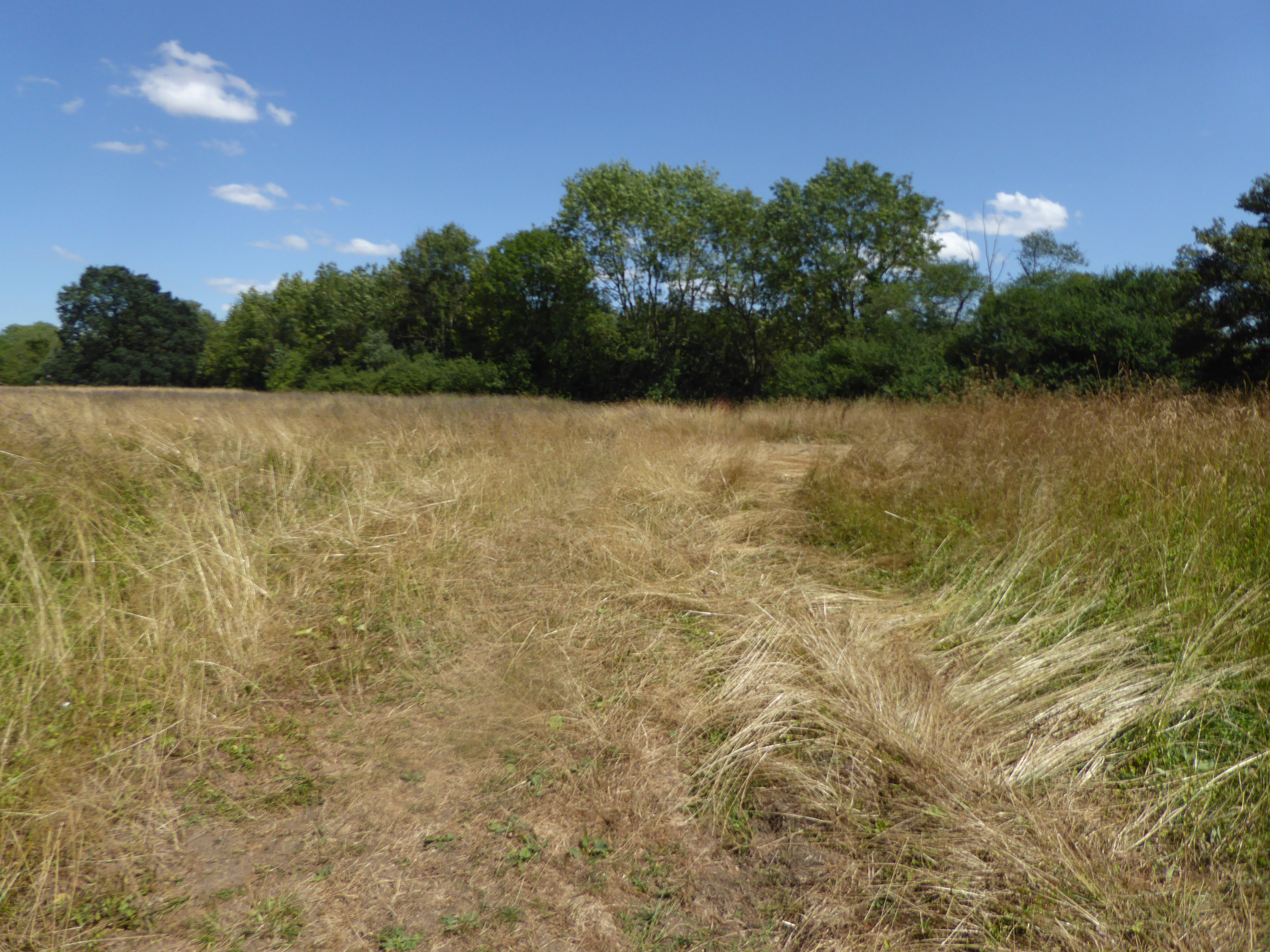
- Location of Fritton Common, Morningthorpe.
- Area of search: Norfolk
- Grid reference: TM 223 921
- Interest: Biological
- Area: 20.5 hectares (51 acres)
- Notification date: 1985
- Location map: Magic Map

Fritton Common, Morningthorpe is a 20.5-hectare (51-acre) biological Site of Special Scientific Interest east of Long Stratton in Norfolk, England.

This damp acidic meadow common is traditionally managed by light cattle grazing. Scattered ancient trees have a wide variety of epiphytic lichens, including some which are locally rare. There are a number of natural ponds with diverse invertebrate fauna.

There is access to the common from Middle Road, which runs through the site.
