= Swannington Upgate Common =

Protected area in Norfolk, England

Coordinates: 52.717°N 1.179°E

- Site of Special Scientific Interest
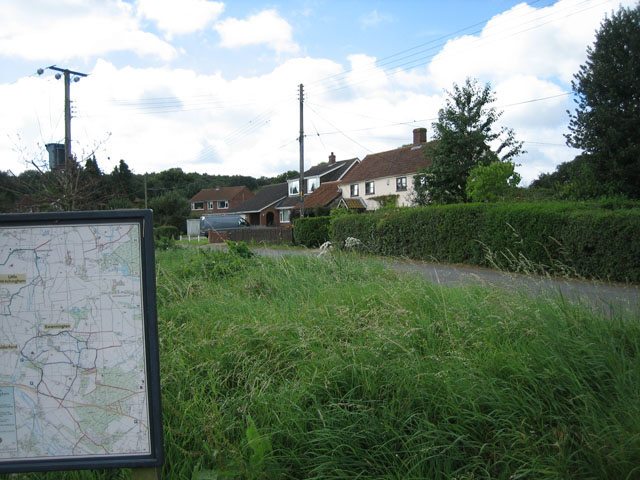
- Location of Swannington Upgate Common.
- Area of search: Norfolk
- Grid reference: TG 148 180
- Interest: Biological
- Area: 20.5 hectares (51 acres)
- Notification date: 1985
- Location map: Magic Map

Swannington Upgate Common is a 20.5-hectare (51-acre) biological Site of Special Scientific Interest north-west of Norwich in Norfolk, England.

This site has varied habitats including glacial sands and gravels, peat, dry and wet heath, woodland, grassland, ponds and a stream. There is a wide range of breeding birds.

The site is open to the public.

== Land ownership ==
All land within Swannington Upgate Common SSSI is owned by the local authority.
