= Holkham Brick Pit =

Protected area in Norfolk, England

Coordinates: 52.950°N 0.770°E

- Site of Special Scientific Interest
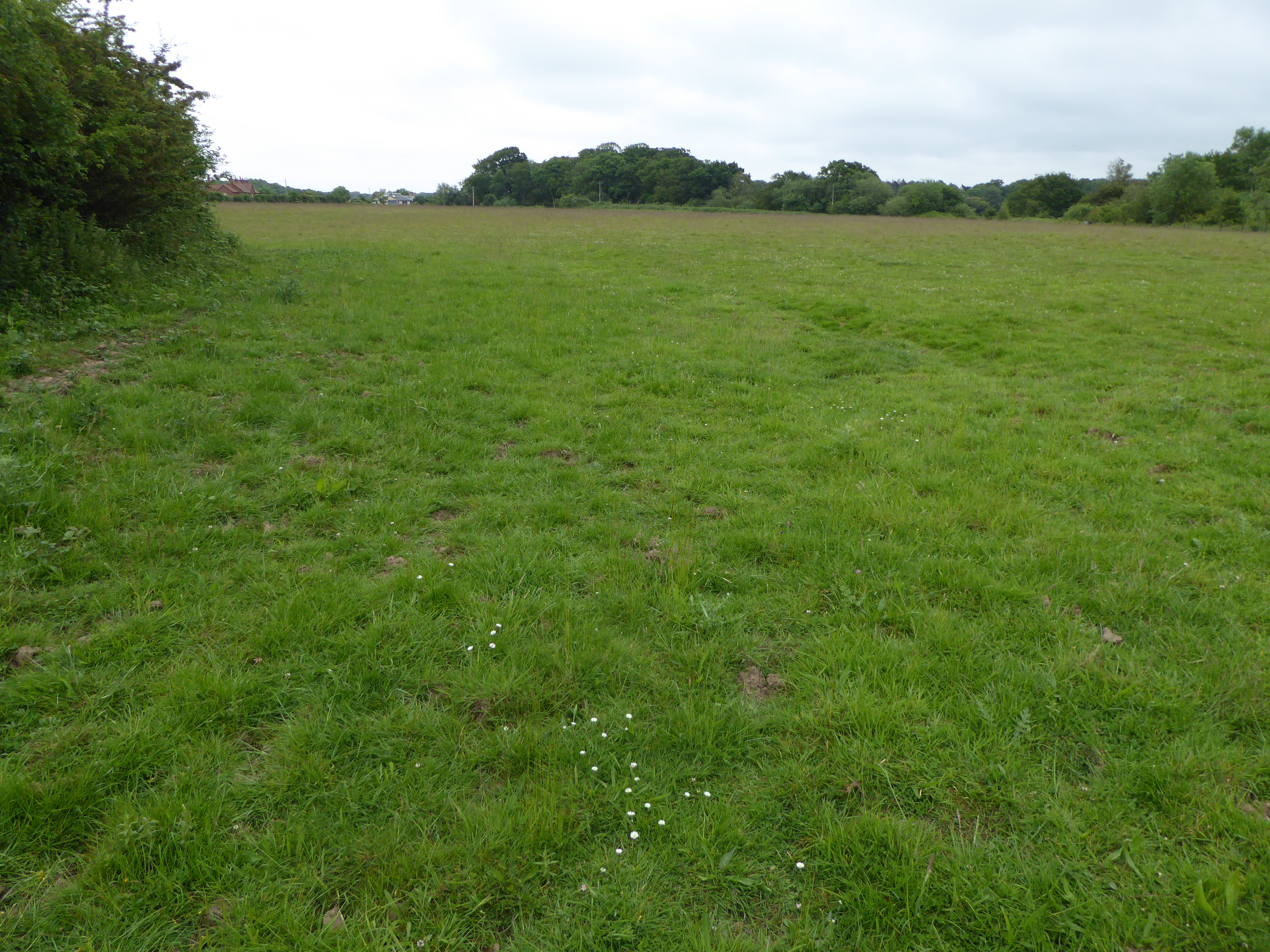
- Location of Holkham Brick Pit.
- Area of search: Norfolk, England
- Grid reference: TF 862 428
- Interest: Geological
- Area: 0.5 hectares (1.2 acres)
- Notification date: 1984
- Location map: Magic Map

Holkham Brick Pit is a 0.5-hectare (1.2-acre) geological Site of Special Scientific Interest west of Wells-next-the-Sea in Norfolk, England. It is a Geological Conservation Review site, and it is in the Norfolk Coast Area of Outstanding Natural Beauty.

This is the best site displaying the Hunstanton Till, a glacial deposit dating the last glacial period, between 115,000 and 11,700 years ago. This is the furthest the ice reached in East Anglia during the Last Glacial Maximum, around 26,000 years ago.

The site is private land with no public access, and no geology is visible as the pit has been filled in.
