= Edgefield Little Wood =

UK Site of Special Scientific Interest

Coordinates: 52.863°N 1.129°E

- Site of Special Scientific Interest
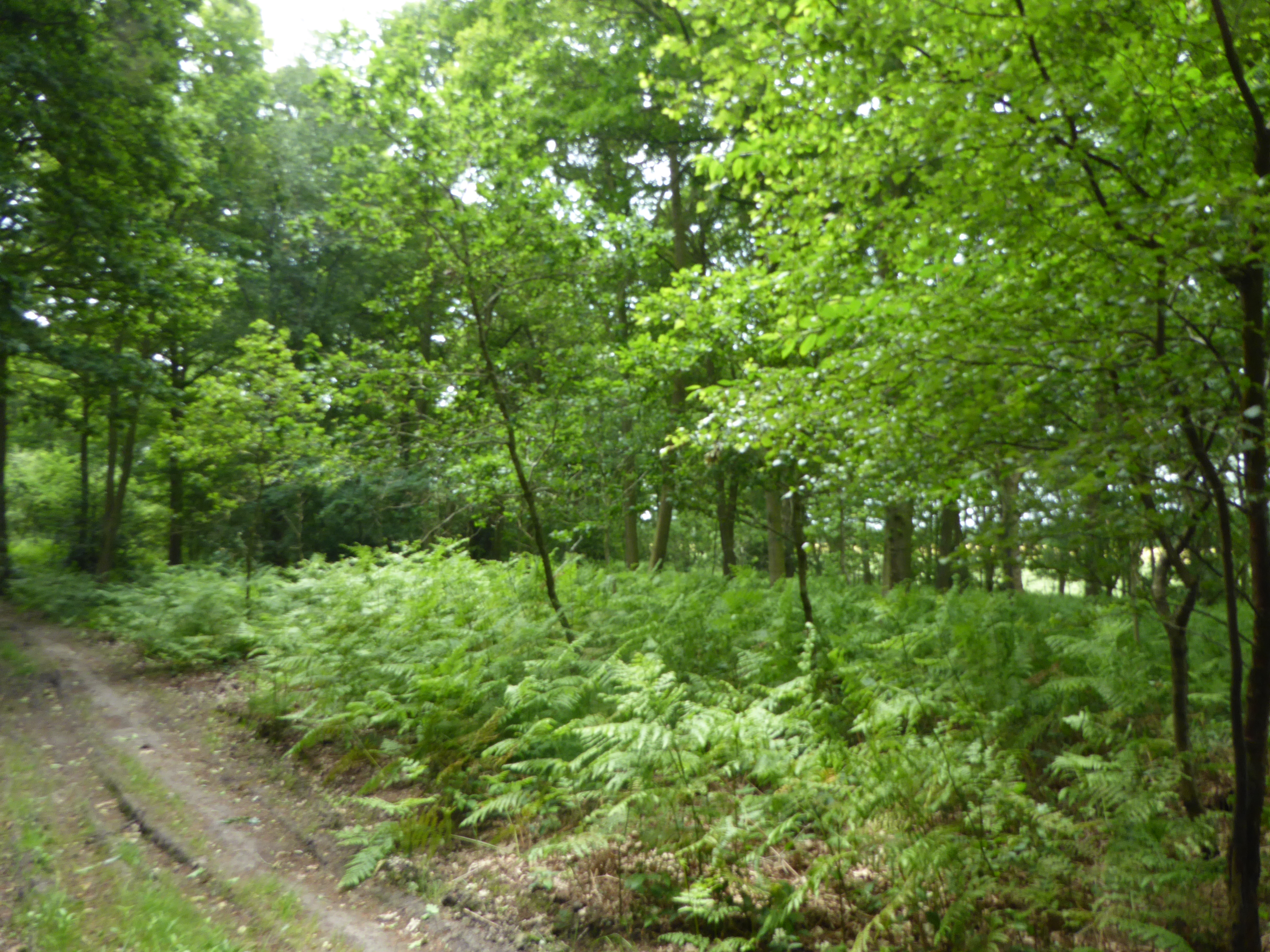
- Location of Edgefield Little Wood.
- Area of search: Norfolk
- Grid reference: TG 107 341
- Interest: Biological
- Area: 5.3 hectares (13 acres)
- Notification date: 1985
- Location map: Magic Map

Edgefield Little Wood is a 5.3-hectare (13-acre) biological Site of Special Scientific Interest south of Holt in Norfolk, England.

This is coppice with standards ancient woodland on acidic sands and gravels. The oaks which have been coppiced in the past have stools which are so tall that the wood resembles high forest. It is surrounded by ancient boundary banks.

There is access from Plumstead Road.
