= Shotesham Common =

Protected area in Norfolk, England

Coordinates: 52.549°N 1.302°E

- Site of Special Scientific Interest
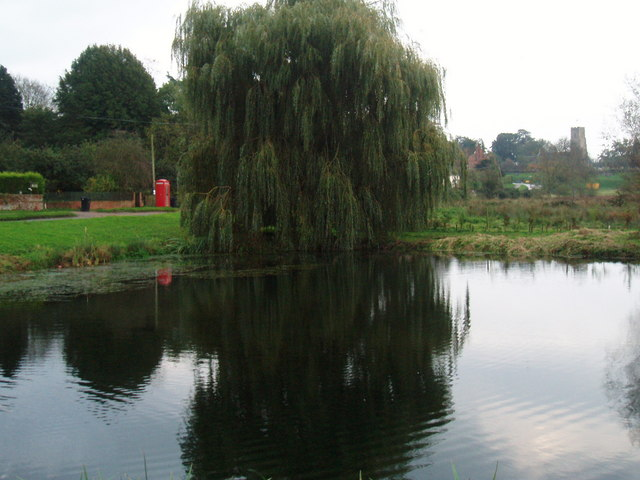
- Location of Shotesham Common.
- Area of search: Norfolk
- Grid reference: TM 240 997
- Interest: Biological
- Area: 21.6 hectares (53 acres)
- Notification date: 1987
- Location map: Magic Map

Shotesham Common is a 21.6-hectare (53-acre) biological Site of Special Scientific Interest south of Norwich in Norfolk, England.

This site consists of traditionally managed meadows with a variety of grassland types, ranging from permanently wet marshes on the valley bottom, where a stream runs through, to drier grassland on the slopes. There are several uncommon species of flora.

A public footpath goes through the common.
