= Winterton-Horsey Dunes =

UK Site of Special Scientific Interest

Coordinates: 52.733°N 1.678°E

- Site of Special Scientific Interest
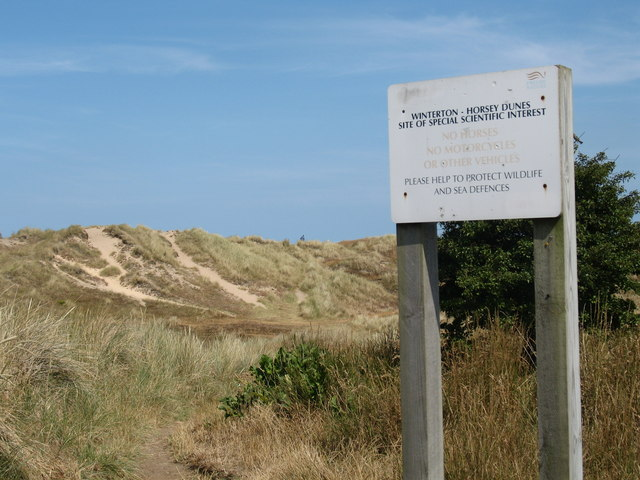
- Location of Winterton-Horsey Dunes.
- Area of search: Norfolk, England
- Grid reference: TG 484 214
- Interest: Biological; Geological
- Area: 427.0 hectares (1,055 acres)
- Notification date: 1989
- Location map: Magic Map

Winterton-Horsey Dunes is a 427-hectare (1,060-acre) biological and geological Site of Special Scientific Interest north of Great Yarmouth in Norfolk, England. It is a Special Area of Conservation and a Nature Conservation Review site, Grade I. Winterton Dunes is a National Nature Reserve Winterton Ness is a Geological Conservation Review site. The whole site is in the Norfolk Coast Area of Outstanding Natural Beauty.

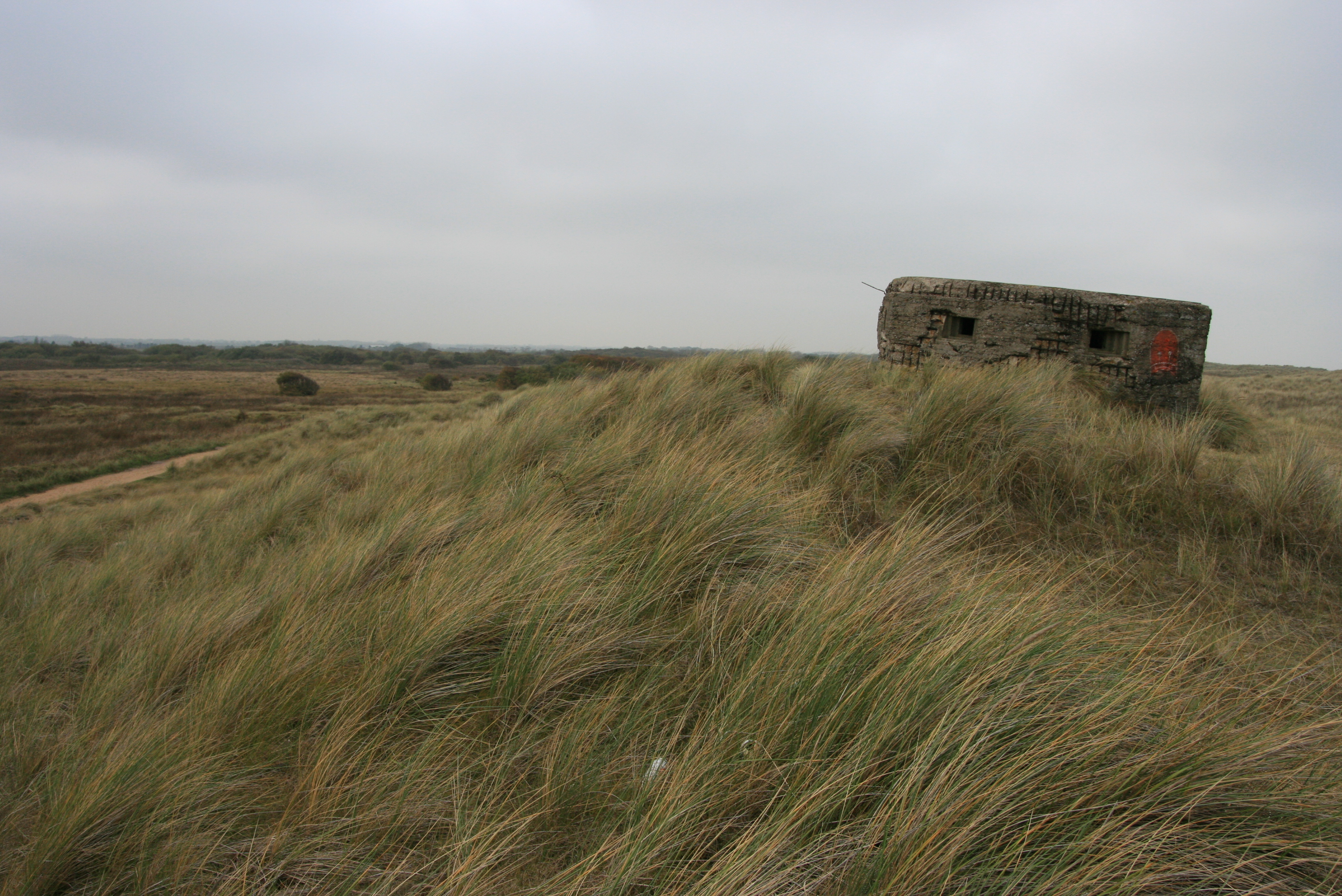
A military pillbox on the dunes

This site has extensive dunes together with areas of grazing marsh and birch woodland. Invertebrates include a rare amphibian and a rare butterfly. The site is geologically important as it displays the processes which control dynamic dune development.

The beach is open to the public.
