= Holly Farm Meadow, Wendling =

Protected area in Norfolk, England

Coordinates: 52.680°N 0.862°E

- Site of Special Scientific Interest
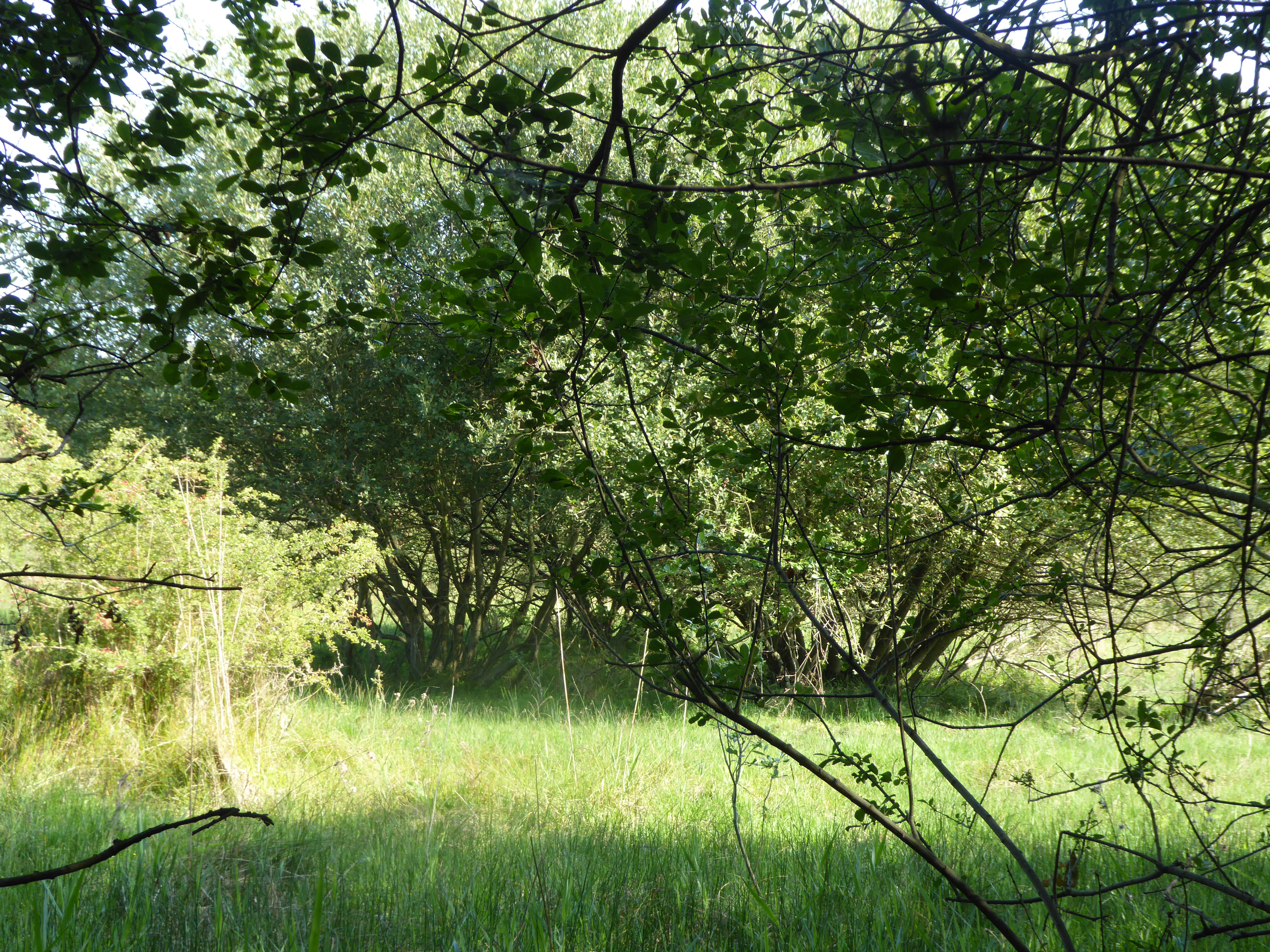
- Holly Farm Meadow
- Location of Holly Farm Meadow, Wendling.
- Area of search: Norfolk
- Grid reference: TF 936 130
- Interest: Biological
- Area: 2.6 hectares (6.4 acres)
- Notification date: 1984
- Location map: Magic Map

Holly Farm Meadow, Wendling is a 2.6 hectares (6.4 acres) biological Site of Special Scientific Interest west of Dereham in Norfolk, England.

The meadow lies in the valley of the River Wensum and contains a line of calcareous springs that support fen grassland with a diverse flora. The unimproved grassland is managed through seasonal grazing. There are also areas of tall fen and dry grassland containing numerous anthills.

The site is private land and there is no public access.
