= Sidestrand and Trimingham Cliffs =

Cliffs in Norfolk, England

Coordinates: 52.902°N 1.381°E

- Site of Special Scientific Interest
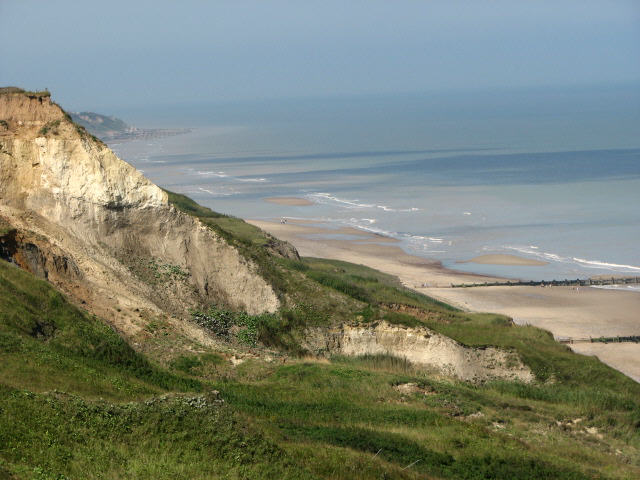
- Location of Sidestrand and Trimingham Cliffs.
- Area of search: Norfolk, England
- Grid reference: TG 275 392
- Interest: Biological; Geological
- Area: 133.9 hectares (331 acres)
- Notification date: 1993
- Location map: Magic Map

Sidestrand and Trimingham Cliffs is a 133.9-hectare (331-acre) biological and geological Site of Special Scientific Interest south-east of Cromer in Norfolk, England. It is a Geological Conservation Review site. It is in the Norfolk Coast Area of Outstanding Natural Beauty.

This crumbling cliff exposes both Pleistocene sediments and a rich assembly of invertebrate fossils dating to the late Cretaceous. It also has several rare beetles and the Red Data Book parasitic herbaceous plant purple broomrape.

The beach is open to the public.
