= Didlington Park Lakes =

Protected area in Norfolk, England

Coordinates: 52.536°N 0.619°E

- Site of Special Scientific Interest
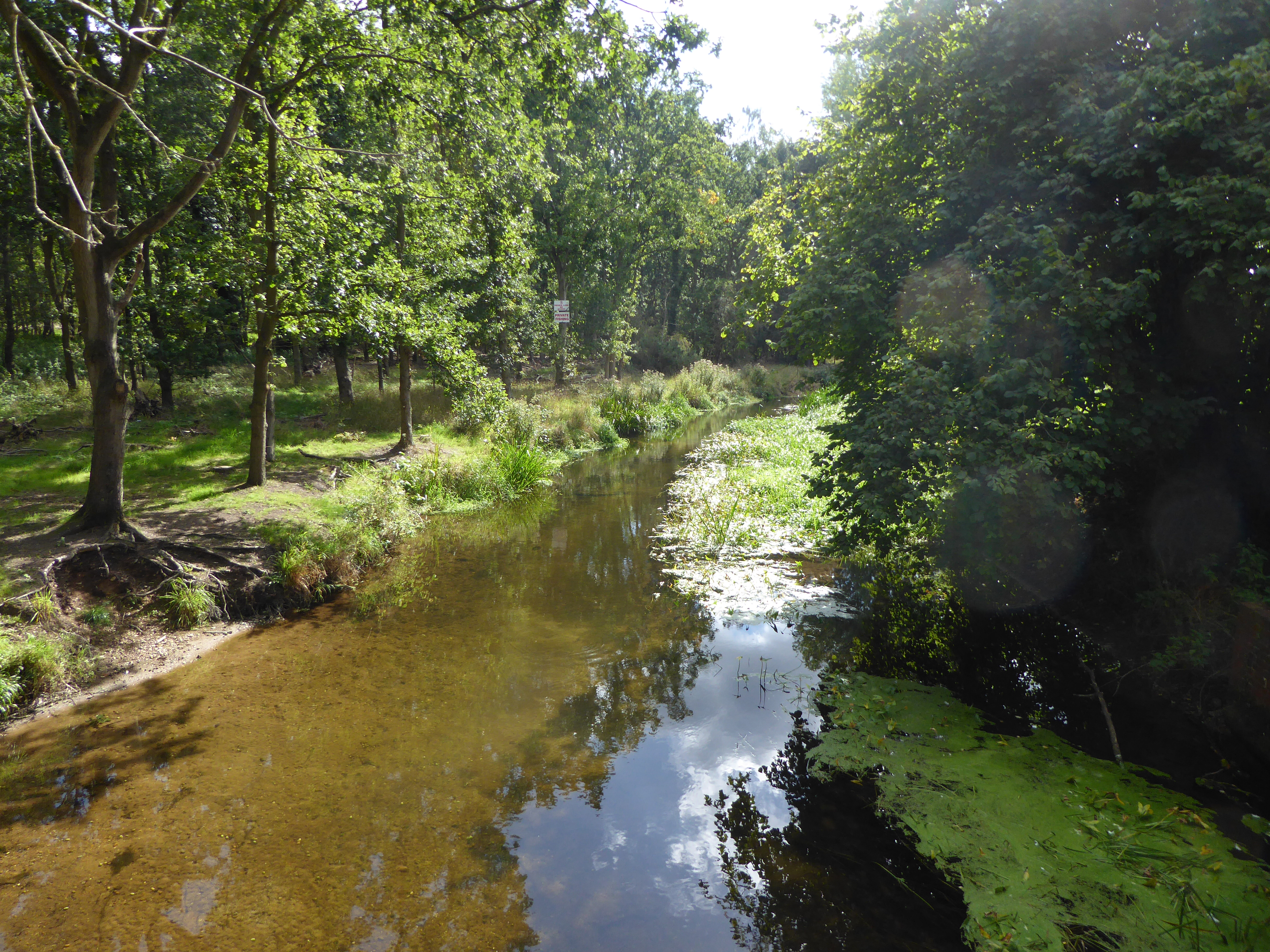
- The River Wissey runs along the southern shore of Didlington Park Lakes.
- Location of Didlington Park Lakes.
- Area of search: Norfolk
- Grid reference: TL 777 963
- Interest: Biological
- Area: 26.1 hectares (64 acres)
- Notification date: 1984
- Location map: Magic Map

Didlington Park Lakes is a 26.1-hectare (64-acre) biological Site of Special Scientific Interest south of Didlington in Norfolk, England.

These three artificial lakes probably date to the early nineteenth century. They are an important breeding site for wildfowl, including gadwall, teal, mallard, shoveler, tufted duck and great crested grebe.

The site is private land with no public access.
