= East Runton Cliffs =

Geological formation in Norfolk, England

Coordinates: 52.938°N 1.271°E

- Site of Special Scientific Interest
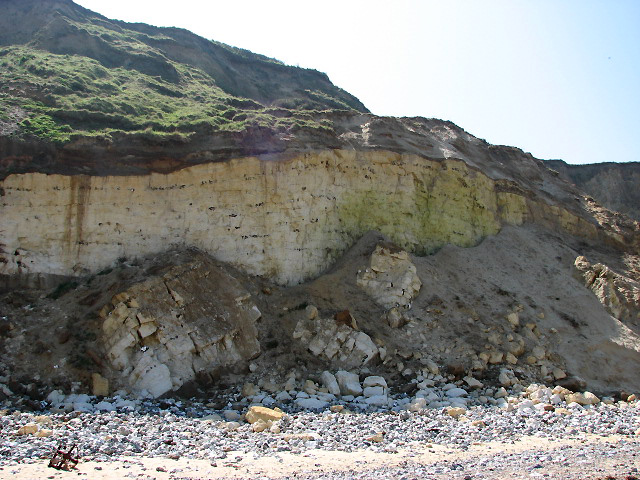
- Location of East Runton Cliffs.
- Area of search: Norfolk, England
- Grid reference: TG 199 429
- Interest: Geological
- Area: 20.6 hectares (51 acres)
- Notification date: 1985
- Location map: Magic Map

East Runton Cliffs is a 20.6-hectare (51-acre) geological Site of Special Scientific Interest west of Cromer in Norfolk, England. It is a Geological Conservation Review site.

The foreshore exposes Lower Pleistocene sediments, including large blocks of glaciotectonic (transported by ice) chalk. There are many fossils, including extinct horses, rhinoceroses, and elephants.

The site is open to the public.
