= Islington Heronry =

Nature site in Norfolk, England

Coordinates: 52.718°N 0.320°E

- Site of Special Scientific Interest
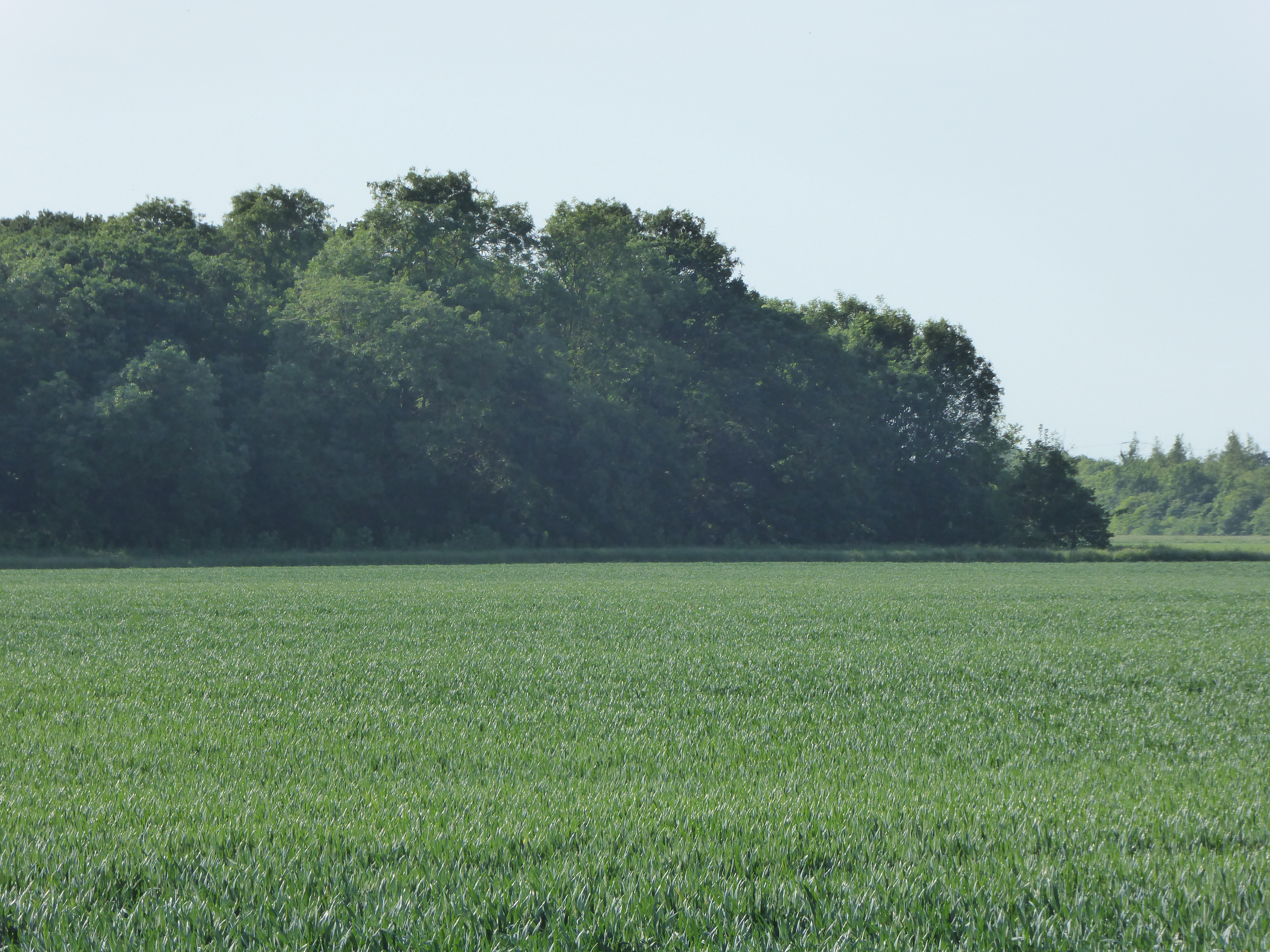
- Location of Islington Heronry.
- Area of search: Norfolk
- Grid reference: TF 568 159
- Interest: Biological
- Area: 1.3 hectares (3.2 acres)
- Notification date: 1984
- Location map: Magic Map

Islington Heronry is a 1.3-hectare (3.2-acre) biological Site of Special Scientific Interest south-west of King's Lynn, Norfolk, England.

This stand of mature oaks has the largest breeding colony of grey herons in the county, with about eighty nests occupied each year. There are several other populations of woodland birds, such as the great spotted woodpecker.

The site is private land with no public access.
