= Alderford Common =

UK Site of Special Scientific Interest

Coordinates: 52.720°N 1.149°E

- Site of Special Scientific Interest
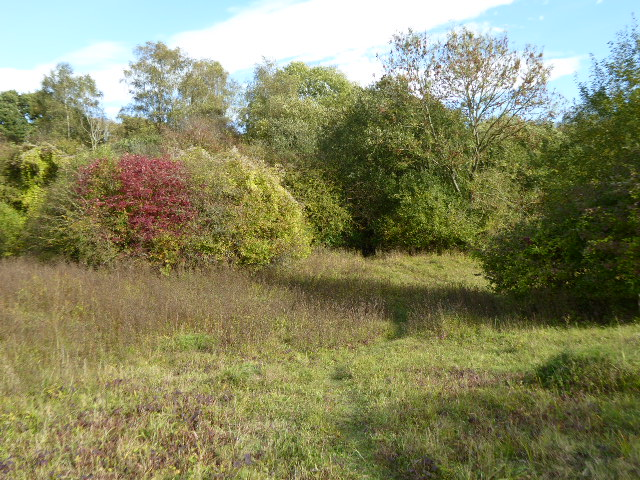
- Location of Alderford Common.
- Area of search: Norfolk, England
- Grid reference: TG 128 183
- Interest: Biological
- Area: 17.5 hectares (43 acres)
- Notification date: 1986
- Location map: Magic Map

Alderford Common is a 17.5-hectare (43-acre) biological Site of Special Scientific Interest north-west of Norwich in Norfolk, England.

The common has a thin layer of glacial sands and gravels over chalk. Habitats include bracken heath, scrub, woodland and ponds, together with species rich grassland in former chalk quarries. An old lime kiln is used by bats and a wide variety of birds breed on the site.

There is access to the site from Reepham Road, which passes through it.
