= Bilsey Hill =

Protected area in Norfolk, England

Coordinates: 52.934°N 1.009°E

- Site of Special Scientific Interest
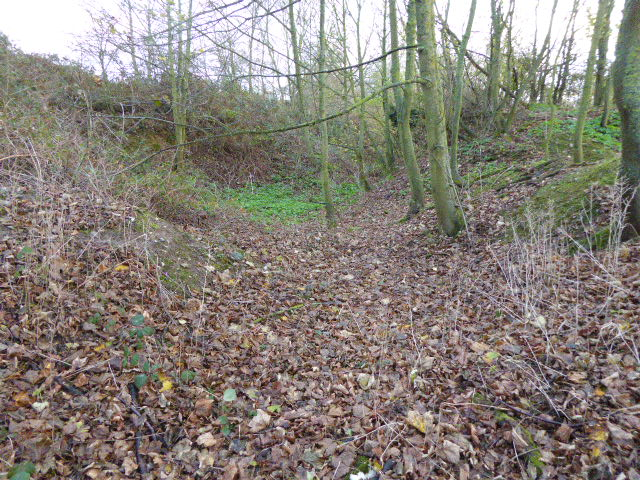
- Location of Bilsey Hill.
- Area of search: Norfolk, England
- Grid reference: TG 023 416
- Interest: Geological
- Area: 3.0 hectares (7.4 acres)
- Notification date: 1992
- Location map: Magic Map

Bilsey Hill is a 3-hectare (7.4-acre) geological Site of Special Scientific Interest south of Blakeney in Norfolk, England. It is a Geological Conservation Review site and it is in the Norfolk Coast Area of Outstanding Natural Beauty.

This 20-metre (22-yard) deep Pleistocene exposure exhibits a sequence of glacial till, sands and gravels associated with the melt phase of the ice sheet.

The site is private land with no public access.
