= Caistor St Edmund Chalk Pit =

UK Site of Special Scientific Interest

Coordinates: 52.595°N 1.306°E

- Site of Special Scientific Interest
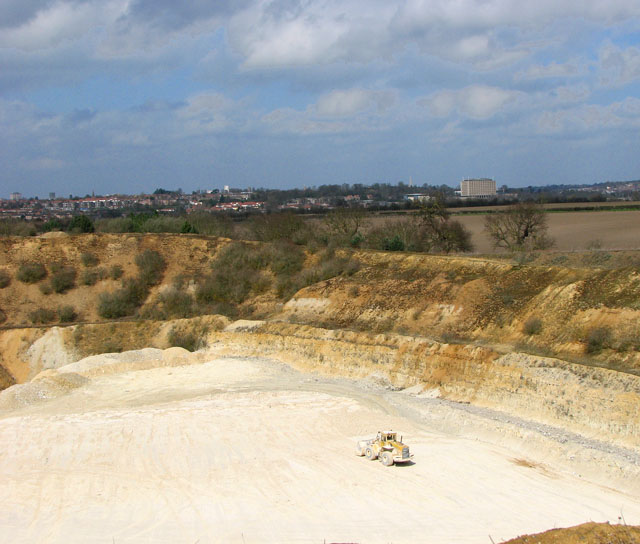
- Location of Caistor St Edmund Chalk Pit.
- Area of search: Norfolk, England
- Grid reference: TG 240 048
- Interest: Geological
- Area: 23.6 hectares (58 acres)
- Notification date: 1985
- Location map: Magic Map

Caistor St Edmund Chalk Pit is a 23.6-hectare (58-acre) geological Site of Special Scientific Interest south of Norwich in Norfolk, England. It is a Geological Conservation Review site.

This site provides the best exposure of the late Campanian Beeston Chalk, around 75 million years ago. It is very fossiliferous, with many molluscs and sea urchins.

The site is private land with no public access.
