= Thetford Golf Course and Marsh =

UK Site of Special Scientific Interest

Coordinates: 52.420°N 0.712°E

- Site of Special Scientific Interest
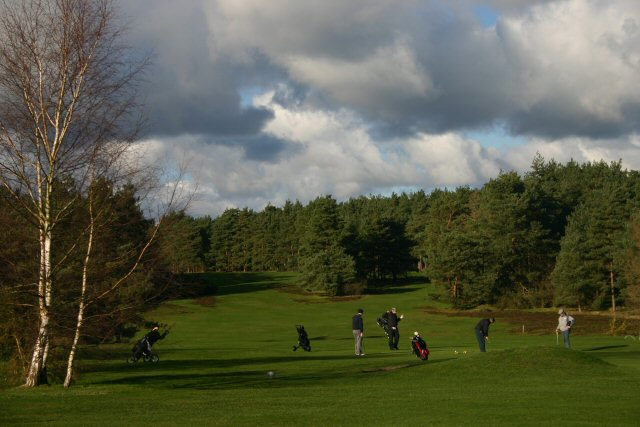
- Location of Thetford Golf Course and Marsh.
- Area of search: Norfolk
- Grid reference: TL 845 837
- Interest: Biological
- Area: 122.3 hectares (302 acres)
- Notification date: 1985
- Location map: Magic Map

Thetford Golf Course and Marsh is a 122.3-hectare (302-acre) biological Site of Special Scientific Interest on the western outskirts of Thetford in Norfolk, England. It is a Nature Conservation Review site, Grade 2, and part of the Breckland Special Area of Conservation and Special Protection Area.

Dry grass heath covers much of the site, accompanied by areas of lichen and heather, with diverse flora. Horse Meadows has wet peaty areas hosting fenland plants and alder woodland.

Much of this site is private property with no public access (part of it is owned by the Crown Estate), but roads cross it.
