= Leziate, Sugar and Derby Fens =

Protected area in Norfolk, England

Coordinates: 52.754°N 0.518°E

- Site of Special Scientific Interest
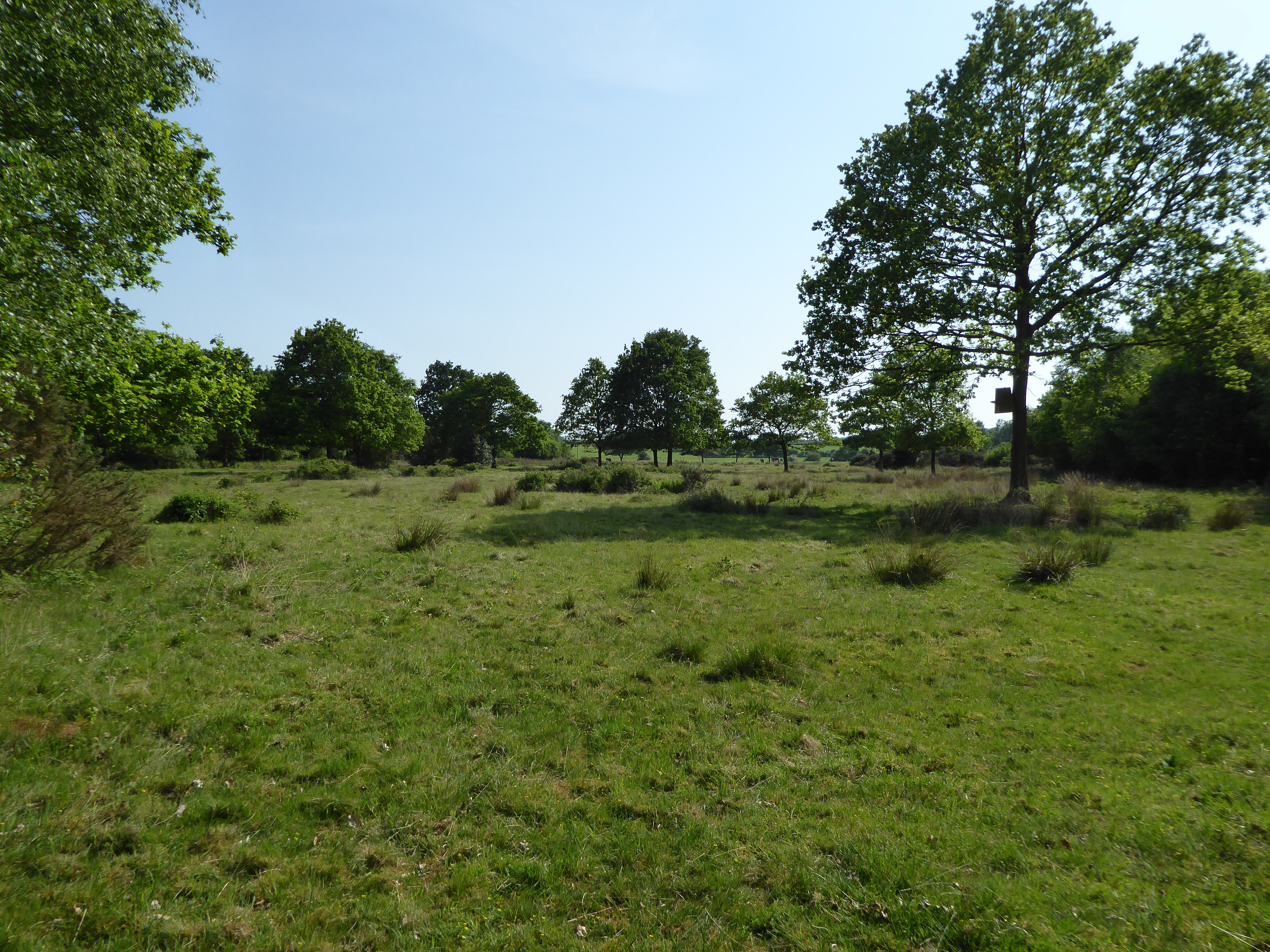
- Sugar Fen
- Location of Leziate, Sugar and Derby Fens.
- Area of search: Norfolk
- Grid reference: TF 700 204
- Interest: Biological
- Area: 87.9 hectares (217 acres)
- Notification date: 1985
- Location map: Magic Map

Leziate, Sugar and Derby Fens is an 87.9-hectare (217-acre) biological Site of Special Scientific Interest east of King's Lynn in Norfolk, England.

These fens have extensive heaths and areas of wet acidic grassland, and there are smaller areas of damp woodland and species-rich calcareous grassland. There are many ant-hills on Derby Fen.

There is public access to the fens, which are in three separate areas.
