= Blackborough End Pit =

Protected area in Norfolk, England

Coordinates: 52.702°N 0.469°E

- Site of Special Scientific Interest
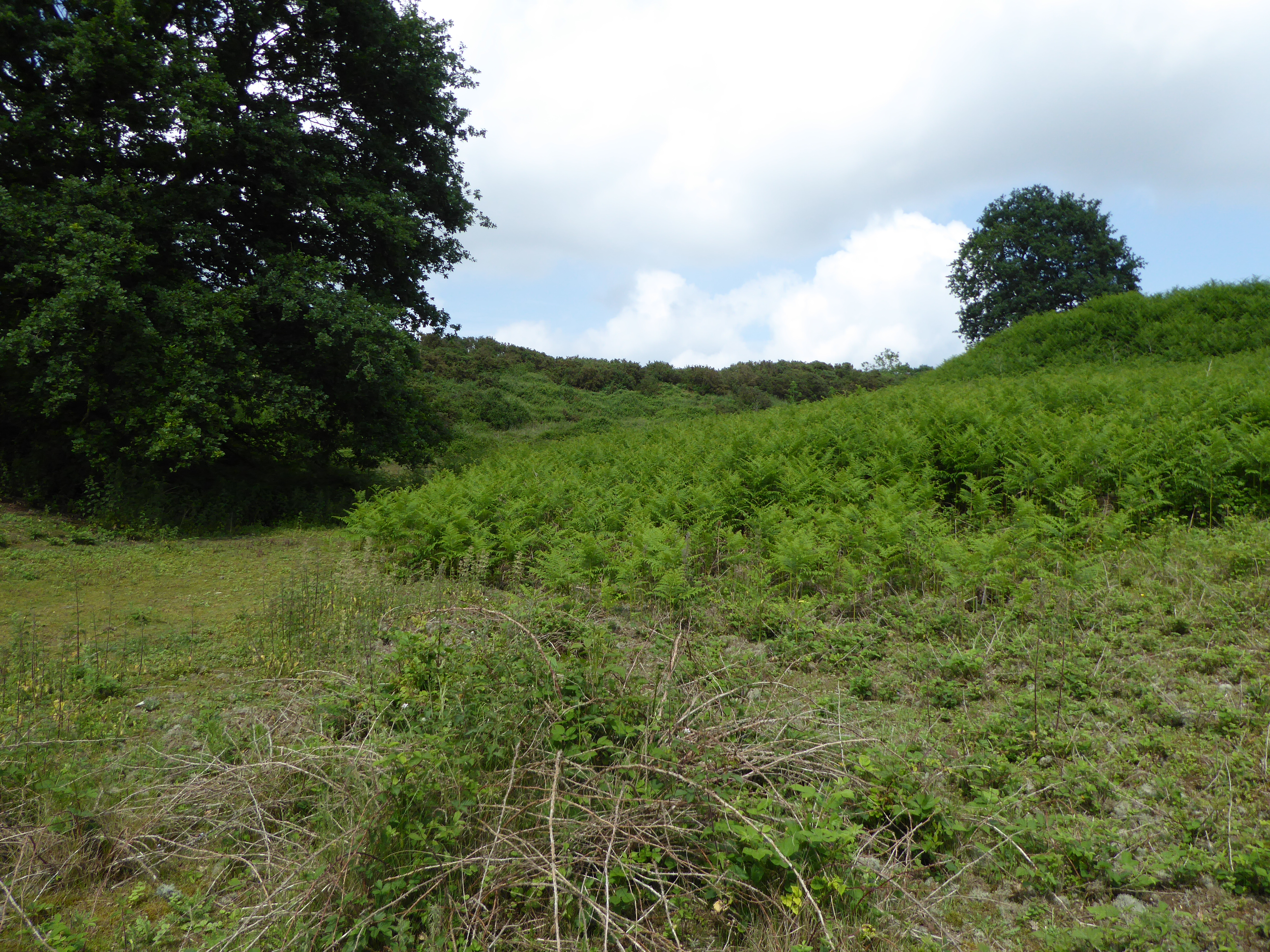
- Location of Blackborough End Pit.
- Area of search: Norfolk, England
- Grid reference: TF 669 145
- Interest: Geological
- Area: 13.2 hectares (33 acres)
- Notification date: 1993
- Location map: Magic Map

Blackborough End Pit is a 13.2-hectare (33-acre) geological Site of Special Scientific Interest south-east of King's Lynn in Norfolk, England. It is a Geological Conservation Review site.

This site is important as a demonstration of erosion during the Lower Cretaceous. The Carstone Formation, which dates to the Albian around 110 million years ago, rests unconformably on the Leziate Beds, which date to the Valanginian, over 130 million years ago, and the normally intervening Dersingham Beds are missing.

The site is private land with no public access.
