= Blo' Norton and Thelnetham Fens =

Nature reserve in east England

Coordinates: 52.37°N 0.961°E

Blo' Norton and Thelnetham Fen
- Site of Special Scientific Interest
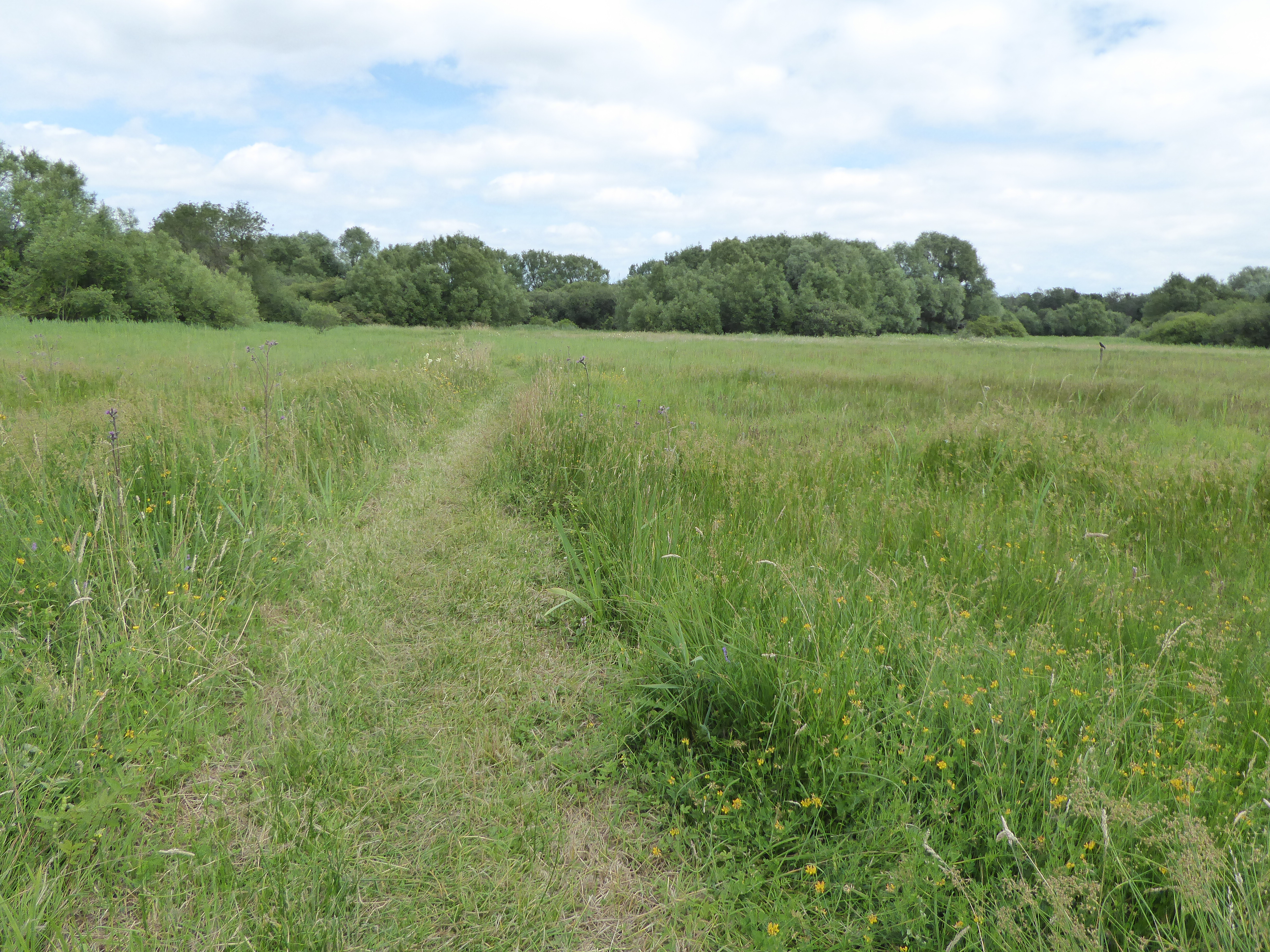
- Thelnetham Fen
- Location of Blo' Norton and Thelnetham Fen.
- Area of search: Norfolk, England; Suffolk, England
- Grid reference: TM 017 788
- Interest: Biological
- Area: 21.3 hectares
- Notification date: 1983
- Location map: Magic Map

Blo' Norton and Thelnetham Fens are a 21.3-hectare (53-acre) biological Site of Special Scientific Interest (SSSI) on the Norfolk/Suffolk border in England. Blo' Norton Fen is in the parish of Blo' Norton in Norfolk and Thelnetham Fen is in Thelnetham parish in Suffolk. It is a Nature Conservation Review site, Grade 2, and part of the Waveney and Little Ouse Valley Fens Special Area of Conservation, Thelnetham Fen is managed by the Suffolk Wildlife Trust and Blo' Norton Fen by the Little Ouse Headwaters Project (LOHP).

== Location ==
The site is located on the Norfolk-Suffolk border to the south of A1066 Diss to Thetford road and north of the A143 between Diss and Bury St Edmunds. It is 6 miles (9.7 km) west of Diss, 10 miles (16 km) south-east of Thetford and 14 miles (23 km) north-east of Bury St Edmunds. The Redgrave and Lopham Fen SSSI is 2 miles (3.2 km) east of the site.

== Ecology ==
The site consists of areas of calcareous fen wetland and associated carr woodland and meadow along the Little Ouse river which marks the county boundary. It is notable for being an internationally important site for the rare black bog rush Schoenus nigricans and saw sedge Cladium mariscus plant species.

The site supports a "very large number of plant species" on the wetter fen areas. Dominant species tend to be black bog rush Schoenus nigricans, saw sedge Cladium mariscus and purple moor grass Molinia caerulea, with species such as fen orchid Dactylorchis praetermissa, devil's bit scabious Succisa pratensis, long-stalked yellow sedge Carex lepidocarpa, quaking grass Briza media, parnassus Parnassia palustris and a number of rare mosses also found in these areas.

Other areas of the fen become drier during periods of dry weather and support a different range of plant life. Taller vegetation is more common, particularly reed Phragmites australis and meadowsweet Filipendula ulmaria. Different plants are associated with this vegetation, increasing biodiversity to include species such as hemp agrimony Eupatorium cannabinum, purple loosestrife Lythrum salicaria and great hairy willowherb Epilobium hirsutum. Scrub and woodland vegetation has developed throughout the fens with sallow and alder predominant in these areas, although Blo' Norton Fen has some oak and ash woodland.

Surrounding meadowlands and ditches support other species, including, for example, ragged robin Lychnis flos-cuculi, marsh marigold Caltha palustris. Bird species found on the site include snipe and grasshopper warbler and the protected Eurasian water shrew is found in the area.

== Management ==
Management includes the managed cutting of fen vegetation on a four-year rotation in order to maintain biodiversity and a range of habitats. The adjacent area of Hinderclay Fen was removed from the SSSI area in 1983 following drainage projects causing the area to dry out. The LOHP has begun to manage the area to return the area to a more semi-natural state, including cutting scrub vegetation and creating ponds on the site.

The fen areas were traditionally used for sites for cutting peat for fuel and for fuelwood. Marked paths, including areas of boardwalk and a footbridge across the Little Ouse, provide access for visitors and the Angles Way path passes through the SSSI.

== Access ==
There is access to Thelnetham Fen from Loggers Lane and Blo' Norton Fen from Fen Road. The fens are connected by a bridge across the River Little Ouse, and the Angles Way footpath runs through Thelnetham Fen.

== See also ==
- List of Sites of Special Scientific Interest in Norfolk
- List of Sites of Special Scientific Interest in Suffolk
- Little Ouse Headwaters Project
