= Hinderclay =

Village in Suffolk, England

Coordinates: 52.35216°N 0.97434°E

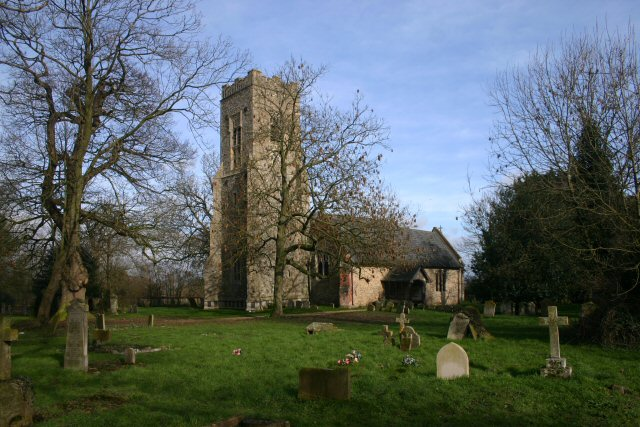
- Church of St Mary, Hinderclay

- Location within Suffolk
- Population: 340 (2005); 326 (2011)
- OS grid reference: TM025768
- District: Mid Suffolk
- Shire county: Suffolk
- Region: East
- Country: England
- Sovereign state: United Kingdom
- Post town: Diss
- Postcode district: IP22
- Dialling code: 01379
- Police: Suffolk
- Fire: Suffolk
- Ambulance: East of England
- UK Parliament: Waveney Valley

Hinderclay is a village and civil parish in the Mid Suffolk district of Suffolk in eastern England. The village is located around 14 miles (23 km) - from Bury St Edmunds in an area of rolling arable land to the south of the Little Ouse river valley. Neighbouring villages include Thelnetham and Rickinghall. In 2005 its population was 340. The parish also contains the hamlet of Thorpe Street.

The parish church is dedicated to St Mary and was thatched until 1842. Hinderclay Hall is to the south of the village. A tower mill used to stand in The Street. It was demolished either in 1920 or 1955. Two pubs used to exist in the village. The Bell (formerly Six Bells) is now residential and known as Orchard House. The old pub was also located close to a bend in the road still known locally as "Bells Corner" (on Bells Lane) and secondly, the Crown.

== History ==
Nearby, on the edge of Hinderclay wood, were found the remains of an early Iron Age settlement. Roman pottery kilns were found in the wood. The village was recorded in Domesday as "Hilderclea" (from the Anglo-Saxon for "tongue of land in a river where the elder grew").

== Natural environment ==
The northern boundary of the parish (also the border with Norfolk) is marked by the River Little Ouse, with the area directly south of the river known as Hinderclay fen. This used to form part of the Blo' Norton and Thelnetham Fen Site of Special Scientific Interest, a wetland site, but agricultural drainage caused the area to dry out. The area is managed by the Little Ouse Headwaters Project with the aim of reverting it to a more natural wetland state.

Hinderclay Lakes, 900 metres (0.56 mi) east, created by the extraction of peat, which is sold for garden use, the lakes have good fishing. Hinderclay Woods are located 1,300 metres (0.81 mi) southwest from the village centre.

== Notable people ==
- Thomas Fowle, rector 1561 to 1566.
- Thomas Carter, first pastor of Woburn, Massachusetts 1642–1684.
