= Thelnetham Windmill =

Grade II* listed tower mill constructed of brick

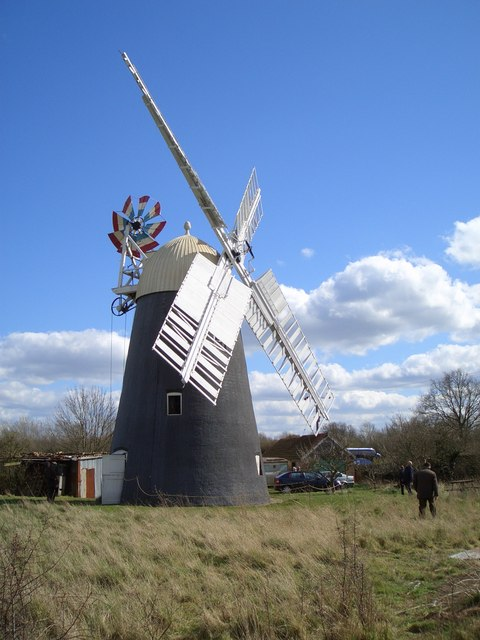
- The restored mill, photographed in 2006
- Interactive map of Thelnetham Windmill

Origin
- Mill name: Button's Mill
- Mill location: TM 011 790
- Coordinates: 52°22′19″N 0°57′18″E
- Operators: Thelnetham Mill; Preservation Trust
- Year built: 1819

Information
- Purpose: Corn mill
- Type: Tower mill
- Storeys: Four storeys
- No. of sails: Four sails
- Type of sails: Double Patent sails
- Windshaft: Cast iron
- Winding: Fantail
- Fantail blades: Eight blades
- Auxiliary power: Originally a Portable steam engine, then an oil engine, now a Ruston & Hornsby diesel engine
- No. of pairs of millstones: Two pairs driven by wind, plus one pair driven by engine
- Size of millstones: 4 feet 4 inches (1.32 m) and 4 feet 7 inches (1.40 m) diameter. Engine driven stones 4 feet 6 inches (1.37 m) diameter.
- Other information: Oldest surviving tower mill in Suffolk.

Thelnetham Windmill, also known as Button's Mill, is a Grade II* listed tower mill constructed of brick. The windmill is located at Thelnetham, Suffolk, England. It was built in the early nineteenth century to grind wheat into flour. Thelnetham windmill worked by wind power until 1924, latterly on two sails, after which it became derelict.

In 1979, a group of enthusiasts purchased Thelnetham windmill for restoration. Numerous volunteers helped to restore the mill to full working order over an eight-year period. The mill is open to the public, and flour ground at the mill can be bought at the site.

The mill is a small four storey tower mill with Patent sails and winded by a fantail. It drives two pairs of millstones, with a third pair driven by an auxiliary engine.

== History ==
The earliest record of a windmill in Thelnetham was a post mill which was shown of Joseph Hodgkinson's map of Suffolk of 1778. In 1818, the post mill was moved to Sandy Lane, Diss, Norfolk

The post mill was replaced by a tower mill, which was built by millwright George Bloomfield for William Button in 1819. The mill was set to work on Christmas Day 1819. In 1832, the mill was modernised by the fitting of a cast-iron windshaft, Patent sails and a fantail. The new windshaft was fitted on 16 July 1832. It was made by J Aickman, the King's Lynn millwright, and weighs 1¾ tons (1,780 kg). A new stock was fitted in September 1836. William Button died on 11 February 1837. The mill passed jointly to his widow Rebecca and their son Richard. Richard Button worked the mill until 1860, at which date it was conveyed to his sons Richard and William, who sold it to Richard Peverett from Kenninghall, Norfolk in 1862.

The mill was worked by Stephen Peverett, Richard's son. He inherited the mill on the death of his father in 1875 and leased it to Henry Bryant in 1879. In 1884, the mill was sold by auction, and Henry Bryant purchased the freehold. Bryant rebuilt the floors of the mill. From 1892, a portable steam engine was used as auxiliary power, driving an extra pair of millstones on the ground floor. This was replaced in 1914 by a Hornsby oil engine. Bryant ran the mill until 1920 when he sold it to Alphonso Vincent, a retired millwright from Garboldisham, Norfolk. The Hornsby engine was sold in the early 1920s. The mill was tailwinded c1920, and as a result one pair of sails was removed. Vincent carried out some repairs to the mill and ran it until he retired in 1924. One of the remaining two sails was wrecked in 1926 when the mill was again tailwinded.

On the death of Alphonso Vincent in 1932, his son George inherited the property. He lived at the site in an old lorry until his death in 1973. The mill passed to his daughter, who sold it in 1974 to Mr and Mrs Humphries, who intended to convert it into a house. They later changed their minds and offered it for sale for restoration. In 1976, the cap of the mill was blown to pieces in a gale. Thelnetham windmill was purchased by five members of the Suffolk Mills Group in November 1979, and plans for restoration were made. The consortium consisted of Mark Barnard, Charles Dolman, Peter Dolman, David Pearce and Chris Seago. The derelict mill and an acre of land cost £6,000.

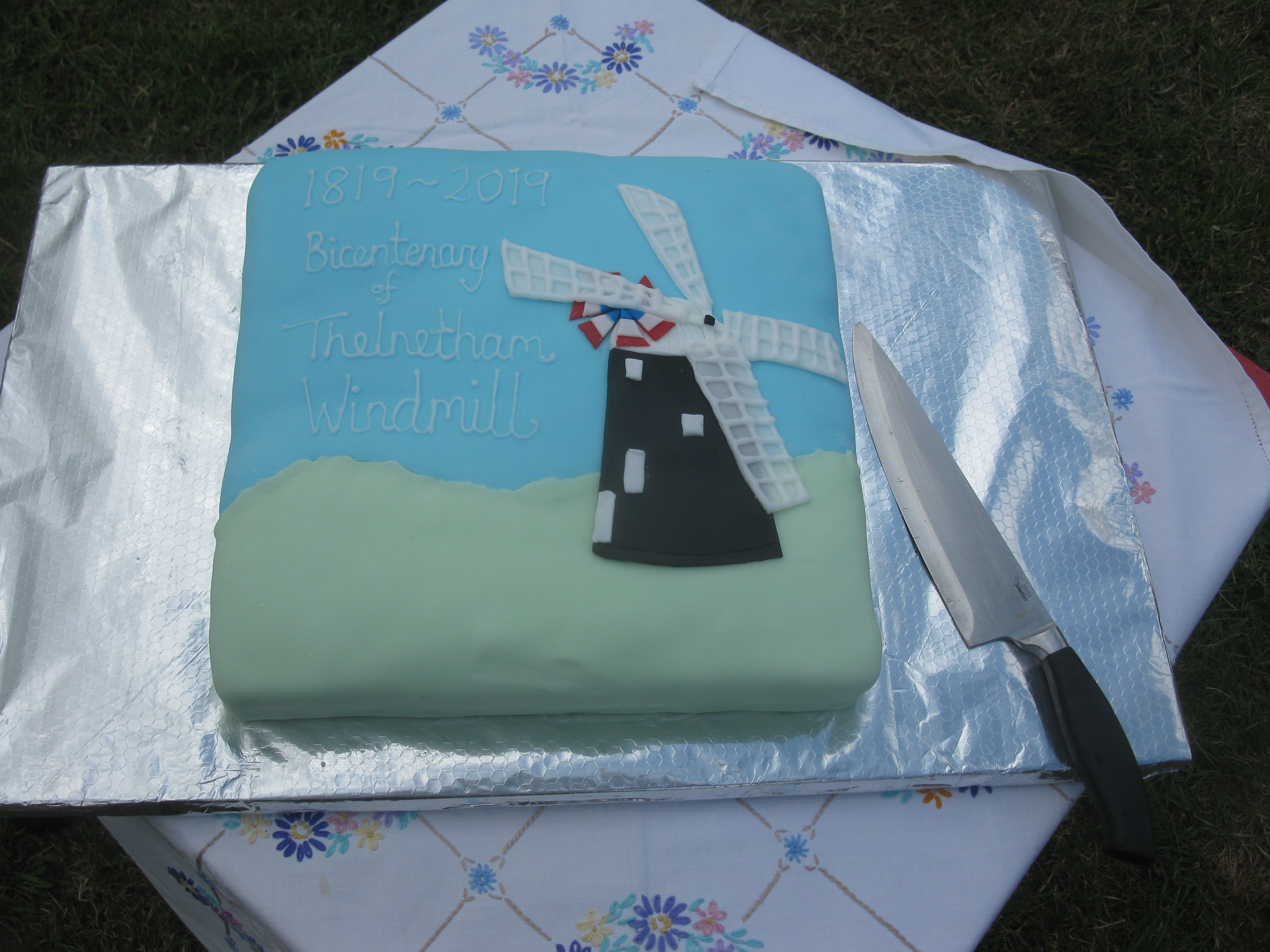
The cake made to celebrate the bicentenary of Thelnetham Windmill.

In 2013, the mill was gifted to the Suffolk Building Preservation Trust, which also owns Pakenham Watermill. On 14 July 2019, the bicentenary of the windmill was celebrated. The Locomobile lorry that George Vincent had lived in, now restored to its original army condition, was present. Also in 2019, the mill was used as a polling station during the European Parliament election in May, and in the General Election in December. The usual venue, Thelnetham Village Hall being unavailable due to it undergoing a major refurbishment.

== Restoration ==
The derelict mill before restoration began

The mill was restored over a period of six years. Much of the work was carried out by enthusiasts who used working holidays to repair the mill.

=== 1979–1980 ===
The consortium took possession of the mill in November 1979. The first priority was to make the mill as weathertight as possible. Polythene sheets were spread on the dust floor of the mill to prevent further water penetration of the structure. The mill was surveyed and recorded. In spring 1980, the dust floor partially collapsed and was removed as a safety measure. Scaffolding was erected to allow the fanstage to be dismantled, and the cap centering wheels were removed in preparation for the removal of the cap frame.

A two-week work-in was held at the end of July and beginning of August 1980. Thirty-three volunteers worked on the mill over the work-in. Two new main floor beams for the dust floor were made from baulks of pitch pine which had previously been in a maltings at Bury St Edmunds. On 3 August 1980, the windshaft and remaining sail fragments were removed by a mobile crane, followed by the cap frame and the cast-iron curb sections.

New oak joists were laid on the dust floor and temporary boarding laid to provide a working platform for repairs to the top of the mill tower. The bin floor was removed, apart from one oak main beam which was repairable. A replacement main beam was made from pitch pine, and the oak beam was repaired. New oak joists were fitted, along with some salvaged from the original floor which were fit to be reused. One of these had previously been a whip from a Common sail. Some of the joists were made from pitch pine from the Eastbridge Windpump, which, following its collapse on 19 February 1977, had been re-erected at the Museum of East Anglian Life, Stowmarket. The sack hoist was dismantled to enable its repair, brickwork was repaired, and new lintels were made for some of the windows. A tarpaulin was secured over the mill tower to keep the weather out over winter. The floorboards on the bin floor were replaced and one of the two pairs of millstones was removed.

The work was financed by grants of £500 from the Council for the Preservation of Rural Essex, £250 from St Edmundsbury Borough Council, £200 from the Scarfe Trust, and £200 from the Suffolk Mills Group. Other donations and income amounted to £65, with the balance of expenditure being met jointly by the five owners.

The "work-in" was reported in both local and national media, including BBC Look East, Bury Free Press, Eastern Daily Press, East Anglian Daily Times, Daily Telegraph, and Radio Orwell.

=== 1981 ===
In the 1981 season two separate work-ins were held, the first from 25 July to 2 August and the second from 22 August to 30 August. A total of 37 volunteers participated over the two weeks.

The millstones were removed from the stone floor, which was then repaired. One of the main beams was found to have been attacked by Death Watch beetles, and over a third of the elm beam was replaced with oak. The six supports for the hurst frame were repaired one at a time, as they bore the whole of the weight of the machinery above. One post required replacement. It had rotted and the floor had sunk by 4 inches (100 mm) causing the second main floor beam to fracture. When this work had been completed, the stone floor was removed, including the second main floor beam, which was removed in one piece so that the most suitable route to install its replacement could be assessed.

The new main beam for the stone floor was installed and the ground floor was concreted. The stone floor was reconstructed, reusing the old stone bearers and those joists that were fit for reuse. Other joists were made new from oak or pitch pine. New floorboards were laid in the dust floor, the 1 1/4 inches (32 mm) thick elm boards being double-grooved with a metal tongue between them. Those on the bin floor are of a similar configuration. The top four courses of brickwork of the mill tower were removed and work began on rebuilding them, aided by a trammel attached to the upright shaft.

During the second work-in, the remainder of the stone floor was boarded, again using double-grooved boards with a metal tongue between them. The window on the dust floor was rebuilt and the reconstruction of the top four courses of brickwork continued. The top two courses were rebuilt with red engineering bricks. The dust floor window had a reinforced concrete lintel cast as the tower was weak at this point and had distorted. The windshaft, the curb segments and fantail gearing were given two coats of red lead paint. A new finial for the cap was made from a piece of oak 3 feet (910 mm) long by 16 inches (410 mm) diameter. A start was made on removing the old pointing on the brickwork and repointing with gauged mortar.

After the work-in had finished, the boarding of the stone floor was completed and the mill thoroughly cleaned in preparation for an open day which was held in late autumn. The work done in 1981 cost £3,250. Donations received were £2,000 from Rank Xerox, £1,704 from the Historic Buildings Council and £130 from St Edmundsbury Borough Council. Other donations and income received amounted to £70. The project received further coverage in local media, the Eastern Daily Press, and South Norfolk News.

=== 1982 ===
The 1982 work-ins took place from 24 July to 1 August and 21 August to 29 August. The work planned included the completion of the brickwork at the top of the tower, installation of the Elm curb, a start on the construction of the new cap, installing machinery and making and fitting various doors and windows. The cap frame was constructed, incorporating two beams from the original cap frame that were fit to be reused. The cap frame was completed in autumn 1982. It had been constructed upside down and a mobile crane was used to turn it over and place the windshaft into position.

=== 1983 ===
Work in the early part of 1983 was mainly confined to smaller jobs such as casting various brasses and overhaul of the various parts of the fantail drivetrain and mechanism for controlling the Patent sails. The mill was generally made as safe as possible inside in preparation for scheduled visits, including one from the Wind and Watermill Section of the Society for the Protection of Ancient Buildings. Other work included the overhaul of the final drive to the 4 feet 7 inches (1.40 m) stones, including dismantling the stone nut and replacement of three cogs in beech.

When the weather improved, work commenced outside. The cap circle was mostly constructed before the first work-in commenced. The work-ins took place over two separate weeks in July and August, with 35 people participating. During the first work-in, the fantail posts and braces were fitted. The oak cap ribs, which had been prefabricated offsite were fitted and the finial was supported by scaffolding ready for final fitting. Intermediate noggings of oak were fitted and the finial was pulled into position using a windlass. The cap frame was completed with the fitting of intermediate ribs and noggings. The rear of the cap circle was also completed during this time.

Between the two work-ins, the rear dormer was completed and the fitting of noggings to the cap frame completed. This enabled a start to be made on boarding the cap on the Monday of the second work-in. The boards for the cap are ½ inch (13 mm) thick and 9 inches (230 mm) wide at the petticoat, tapering towards the top. A new neck bearing was installed under the windshaft, not without difficulty and much machining before it would fit. When the boarding of the cap was completed, the cover strips were fitted over the joints. The petticoat was drawn into position using a rope and windlass, and the galvanised steel reinforcing band screwed into position, producing a sturdy structure. The striking rod was fitted through the windshaft and the axle for the fantail fitted in position on top of the fantail posts. At the top of the mill tower, the curb was prepared to accept the cap, and the cast iron curb track plates bolted into position. Repointing of the brickwork of the tower continued, with nearly half of it completed at the end of the second work-in.

After the work-ins had ended, work continued on finishing the cap which was scheduled for lift-on in October. The weather hampered the work initially, but the application of a modern microporous paint, designed to withstand normal movement of the timber and yet remain waterproof, was completed in time for the lift-on. A mini work-in was held the weekend before the cap was lifted, with 17 people participating over the weekend. Final work was done to the cap and a new window was fitted to the stone floor of the mill. The tarpaulin was removed and the trammel dismantled. The 5-ton cap was lifted into place by a mobile crane on 24 October 1983, watched by a crowd of some 70 people. The fitting of the cap was toasted with beer from Adnams Brewery, Southwold.

Restoration work in 1983 cost £1,408. Grants were received from the Association of Independent Museums, Blo' Norton Women's Institute, Ipswich Historical Transport Society, the National Association for Gifted Children, Mr D. Porter and the Society for the Protection of Ancient Buildings. Further income came from the sale of guide books and a drawing of the mill by Wilf Foreman.

=== 1984 ===
Four work-ins were held during 1984. The first two were by apprentices from Eastern Electricity Board. Thelnetham Windmill was chosen at the project to benefit from the Young Person's Development Project for that year. Pakenham Watermill had previously benefited from the project, and its owners, the Suffolk Preservation Trust, had suggested that Thelnetham Windmill would be a good candidate for the scheme. Two separate parties spent a week each at the mill. A mains electricity supply was provided. An underground cable was laid with assistance from British Telecom who were trialling a thrust borer which had been developed at their research facility at Martlesham Heath. The thrust borer laid 25 yards (23 m) of ducting through which the mains cable was pulled into position. The mill was then supplied with lights and sockets on each floor.

Other work undertaken by the apprentices involved repairing some frost damage to the foundation brickwork, digging a drainage trench around the mill and moving the auxiliary engine into position. A concrete path around the tower was trapping moisture, leading to rising damp. A French drain was constructed around the mill to remedy these problem. A 21 horsepower (16 kW) Ruston & Hornsby 4YHR diesel engine had been purchased in 1981 and was fitted onto a permanent concrete base with the aid of a mobile crane. After fitting it was then painted. Some missing or broken parts were made or repaired as necessary.

Off-site, the new brake wheel and fantail were made. The original brake wheel was too rotten to repair, and showed evidence that it had been altered from the original one installed in 1819. The original brake wheel was 6 feet (1.83 m) diameter to allow the Common sails to run at their optimum speed. When the mill was modernised in 1832 it was necessary to alter the gear ratios within the mill, as Patent sails run at a slower speed than Common sails. The great spur wheel was increased in diameter and the stone nuts reduced in diameter. The brake wheel was also rebuilt, with a cast-iron segment ring fitted in place of the original cogs, resulting in a wheel 7 feet 2 inches (2.18 m) in diameter. The opinion of professional millwrights was sought, and it was decided that a scaled-up version of the original brake wheel would be made, but retaining the cast iron teeth segments. The remains of the original brake wheel were retained as an exhibit in the mill. The original iron segments were all broken, so a pattern was made and new segments were cast in heat-treated malleable cast iron. When the brake wheel was completed it was dismantled and transported to the mill ready for reassembly.

The fantail was made. Some of the small gears were replaced. The stocks were made from pitch pine and the blades from Douglas fir. Work at the mill over the winter included repairs to the brickwork and windows, with only one window still needing attention when the first work-in began. New beech cogs were fitted to the crown wheel, which was restored to its correct position on the upright shaft.

The stocks and sails were made during the two work-ins held in July and August, a total of 41 people attending over the two weeks. A second-hand stock had been bought in the 1920s and preserved at the mill, but upon examination it was found to be unfit for use. Thus two new stocks were required instead of one. Modern steel stocks had already been discounted on cost and durability grounds, leaving two options. Traditional stocks made from a single piece of timber, or laminated stocks. Good quality pitch pine was not obtainable in the lengths required. Douglas fir was obtainable in such lengths but was discounted on strength and durability grounds. A Douglas fir stock on a nearby mill had rotted after only seven years. Thus it was decided that laminated stocks would be made.

The 52 feet (15.85 m) long stocks were made from Douglas fir. All timber had been pressure treated with preservative and well seasoned. It was estimated that a laminated stock would be up to 20% stronger than a similar stock of solid timber. The timber used was 1 1/2 inches (38 mm) thick and nine laminations were required at the centre, where the stock passes through the poll end of the windshaft. Careful attention was paid to where individual joints occurred between different pieces of timber. Both stocks were made during the work-in, with one of them being trimmed and finished ready for use. The stocks were the first laminated stocks made by amateurs.

The four sails were made. The originals being slightly different pairs. Those on the inner stock having bays of 3 feet (910 mm) pitch and those on the outer stock having bays of 3 feet 2 inches (970 mm) pitch. It was decided that the new sails would be identical, at the larger pitch. Four 27 feet (8.23 m) long whips were cut from a baulk of pitch pine obtained from a demolished maltings at Bury St Edmunds. The whips are 6 inches (150 mm) square at their inner end. Sail bars and uplongs were made from modern pitch pine, selected for quality. The mortices for the sail bars were cut. That at the heel of the sail being at 27° and that at the tip being 15°, decreasing by 1½° at each sail bar. Three of the four sails had been completed at the end of the work in.

The fantail and associated gearing was fitted to the mill. At the end of the second work-in, the cap could be turned by means of the hand crank. The fantail itself, with the blades painted red, white and blue was installed shortly afterwards. The clasp arm brake wheel was assembled around the windshaft. It was found that the wallower was eccentric on the upright shaft by ½ inch (13 mm). When this was corrected the brake wheel was within ^{1}/_{16} th of an inch (less than 1 mm) of true. The clamps for the stocks were sawn from a baulk of pitch pine ready for completion later in the year. Other work included a new frame for one of the ground floor doors, cleaning and painting ironwork and further repointing on the brickwork. The four sails were fitted to the mill with the aid of a mobile crane at the end of the second work-in. The stock, with one sail attached was carefully inserted through the poll end of the windshaft and when wedged in position and the clamps had been attached the second sail was fitted to the stock. The process was repeated for the second pair of sails. The mill turned by wind again on the last day of the second work-in.

Work later in the year included the finishing of the fourth sail, balancing the fantail and sorting out teething troubles with the fantail gearing. The brake and brake lever were made and installed and shutter cranks for the sails were cast.

Restoration work in 1984 cost £2,918. Grants received were £1,209 from English Heritage, £500 from St Edmundsbury Borough Council, Other donations amounted to £52. Income from open days at the mill came to £151. A boost to the funds was £2,000 from Hervey Benham. This money had been allocated to allow the moving of a derelict post mill buck to Thelnetham. In the end, the removal was not proceeded with, and Mr Benham allowed the donation to remain with the Thelnetham Mill Preservation Trust. The project received further support in local media, including the East Anglian Daily Times, one of the work-ins being featured on Anglia Television's About Anglia programme.

=== 1985–87 ===
Work planned for 1985 included the replacement of the dust floor window and completion of the stocks and sails. The external walls of the mill were tarred and internal walls plastered. Two work-ins were held, from 20 July to 28 July and 17 August to 26 August. Further work over the next two years saw the restoration completed in 1987.

=== Restoration team ===
The restoration of Thelnetham Windmill was made possible by the efforts of 135 individuals and 61 organisations. This was achieved by the donation of labour, plant, materials or grants of money, or by giving discounts for materials purchased or providing publicity for the project.

== Description ==
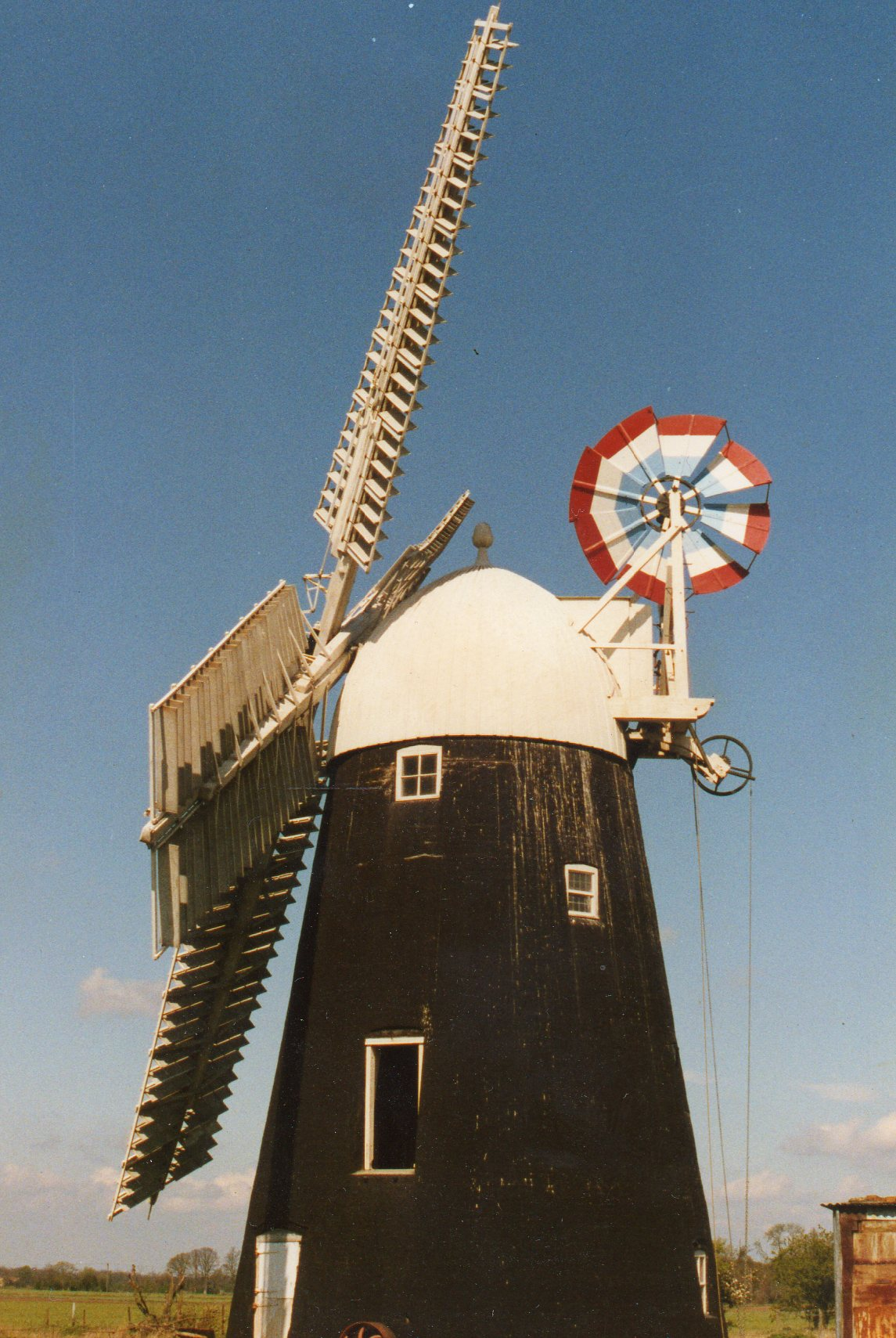
The restored mill, May 1989

Terms explained in the Mill machinery article are in italics

As built in 1819

A four-storey tower mill with Common sails carried on a wooden windshaft, driving two pairs of overdrift millstones. Brake wheel 6 feet (1.83 m) diameter. Winding was by hand.

As restored

The four-storey tower is built of brick, and stands 31 feet 5 inches (9.58 m) from ground level to the curb. The walls are 2 feet (610 mm) thick at ground level. The mill is described from the top down.

The pepperpot cap sits on top of the tower, giving the mill an overall height of 45 feet (13.72 m) to the finial. It houses the cast-iron windshaft and 7 feet 2 inches (2.18 m) diameter wooden brake wheel internally. Externally the four double Patent sails span 64 feet (19.51 m). They are 9 feet (2.74 m) wide and can develop 30 horsepower (22 kW). The eight bladed fantail keeps the mill turned into wind.

The top floor of the mill is the dust floor. It could be used for storage of grain and gives internal access to the cap. The cast-iron wallower, which is driven by the brake wheel is carried at the top of the upright shaft, in the centre of the mill.

The bin floor is where the grain is stored before being ground into flour. The sack hoist mechanism is housed on this floor, driven from the wooden crown wheel on the floor below by belt.

The stone floor is where the two pairs of underdrift French Burr millstones are located. The stones are 4 feet 4 inches (1.32 m) and 4 feet 7 inches (1.40 m) diameter. The wooden crown wheel is located towards the ceiling. This drives the sack hoist on the bin floor. Other machinery on this floor are an oat crusher and a flour dresser.

The ground floor of the mill is the meal floor. It is where the freshly ground flour is delivered for bagging up. The wooden great spur wheel, located at the bottom of the extended upright shaft and stone nuts are located on this floor. The great spur wheel has been converted from compass arm construction to clasp arm construction. A third pair of 4 feet 6 inches (1.37 m) diameter French Burr millstones is located on a hurst frame, driven by the auxiliary engine via a fast and loose pulley.

== Millers ==
- William Button 1819-37
- Rebecca Button 1837-??
- Richard Button 18??-60
- William Button 1860-62
- Richard Button (Jr) 1860-62
- Stephen Peverett 1862-79
- Henry Bryant 1879-1920
- Alphonso Vincent 1920-24
- George Vincent 1920-24

Reference for above:-

== Culture and media ==
A video of the restoration of the mill was produced by Viv Codd.

== Public access ==
Thelnetham Mill is open to the public on Easter Monday, the Sunday of the late May and August bank holidays and the first Sunday in July, August and September. It is also open at other times by prior arrangement.
