= Mattishall Moor =

Protected area in Norfolk, England

Coordinates: 52.665°N 0.996°E

- Site of Special Scientific Interest
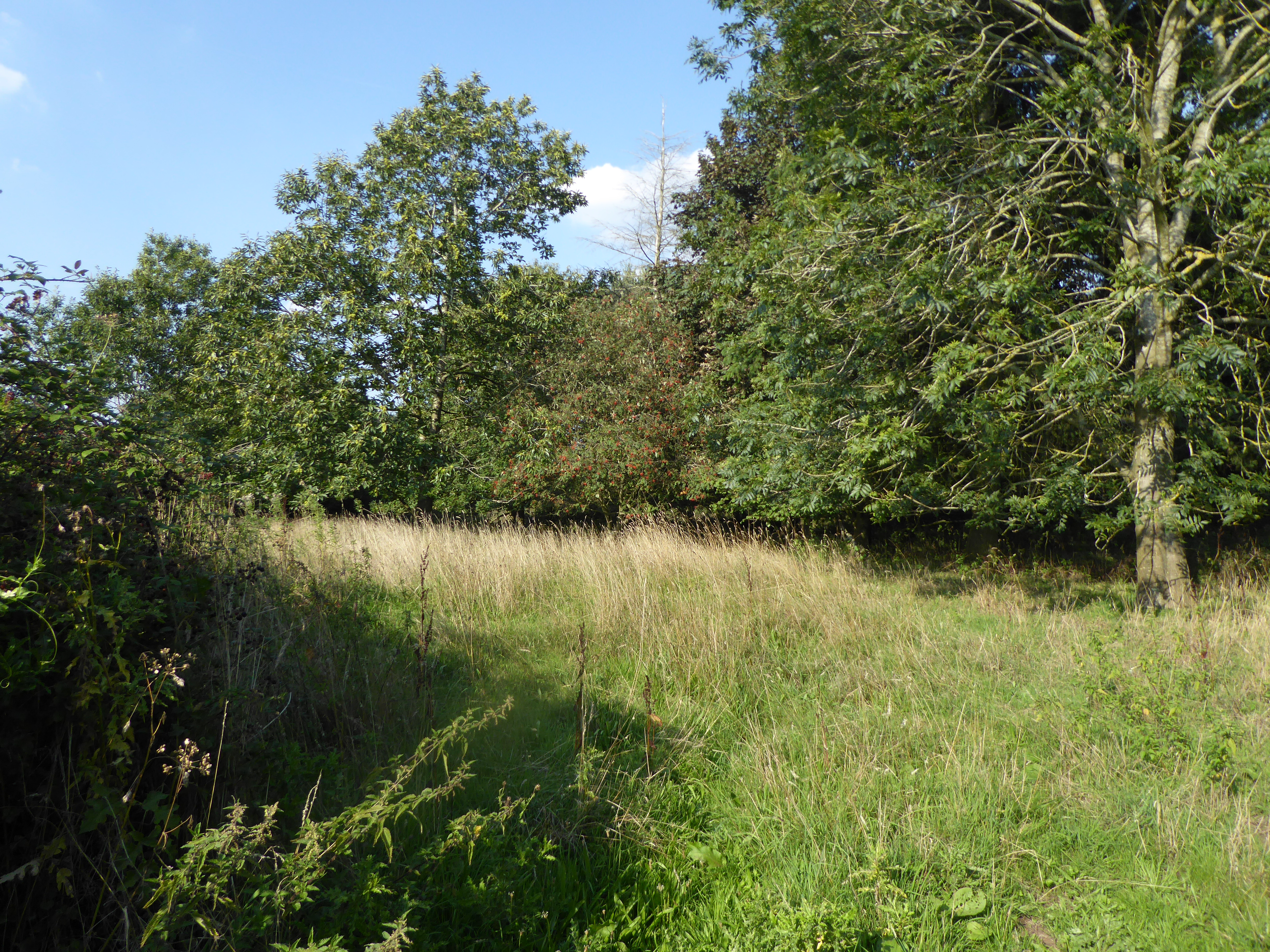
- Location of Mattishall Moor.
- Area of search: Norfolk
- Grid reference: TG 027 117
- Interest: Biological
- Area: 5.5 hectares (14 acres)
- Notification date: 2001
- Location map: Magic Map

Mattishall Moor is a 5.5-hectare (14-acre) biological Site of Special Scientific Interest east of Dereham in Norfolk, England.

This area of calcareous fen and marshy grassland has a rich variety of flora. Black bog-rush, blunt-flowered rush and purple moor-grass are common in the fen areas, and purple moor-grass is also abundant in the grassland, together with other plants such as yellow rattle and marsh pennywort.

The site is private land with no public access.
