= Thelnetham =

Village in Suffolk, England

Coordinates: 52.365°N 0.960°E

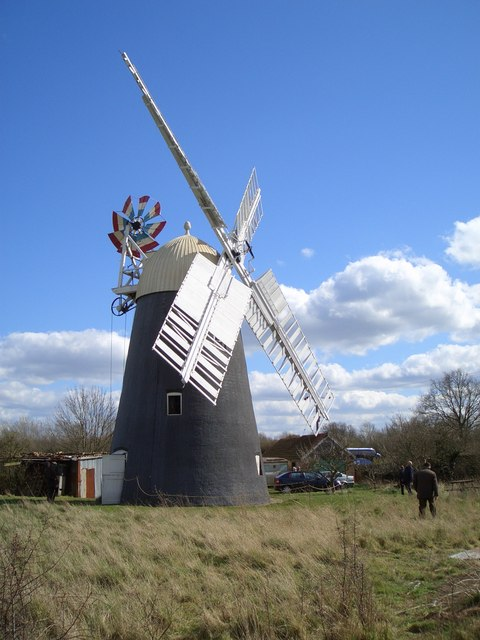
- Thelnetham Windmill

- Location within Suffolk
- Population: 230
- District: West Suffolk
- Shire county: Suffolk
- Region: East
- Country: England
- Sovereign state: United Kingdom
- Post town: Diss
- Postcode district: IP22
- Police: Suffolk
- Fire: Suffolk
- Ambulance: East of England
- UK Parliament: West Suffolk

Thelnetham is a village and civil parish in the West Suffolk district of Suffolk in eastern England. Located on the southern bank of the River Little Ouse (the Norfolk-Suffolk border), six miles west of Diss, in 2005 its population was 230. The village of Blo' Norton lies on the Norfolk side of the river. The name of the village derives from the Old English words "thel" which means a plank bridge, "elfitu" meaning swans and "hamm" meaning a meadow or enclosure. Hence the village is the "meadow with the plank bridge and the swans".

== Blo' Norton and Thelnetham Fen ==
North of the village and along the river is the Blo' Norton and Thelnetham Fen Site of Special Scientific Interest, an important calcareous fen wetland site supporting a range of rare species such as black bog rush Schoenus nigricans and saw sedge Cladium mariscus plant species. The Little Ouse Headwaters Project manages part of this area as well as surrounding wetland areas such as Hinderclay Fen and Suffolk Wildlife Trust also has a reserve on part of the site.

== Bugg's Hole Fen SSSI ==
The 4 hectares (9.9 acres) Bugg's Hole Fen SSSI is located west of the village. This is a spring fed area of fen with a wide range of habitats and flora including uncommon plant species such as common butterwort Pinguicula vulgaris, bog pimpernel Lysimachia tenella (syn. Anagallis tenella) and adder's tongue fern Ophioglossum vulgatum.

== Church of St. Nicholas ==
The Church of St. Nicholas is the Church of England parish church of Thelnetham and part of the United Benefice of Stanton.

Dating from the 14th century, it is said to have been built by Edmund Gonville, founder of Gonville Hall, later Gonville and Caius College, Cambridge, who was rector here from 1320 to 1326. Many older features remain including a simple octagonal font, the doorways and stairs to the rood loft behind the pulpit, a 14th-century arcade, and arches with octagonal piers and quarter-round mouldings. The chancel and south aisle both have medieval stone altars with recut consecration crosses which were reinstated during the 1895 restoration. Other notable features include a small brass with an inscription below it to Anne Caley (around 1500) on the large squint at the south-east end of the nave. On the south wall of the aisle an alabaster and marble monument to Henry Buckenham (died 1648) and Dorothy his wife (died 1645) can be found and on the north wall of the nave is an 18th-century wooden panel with the Flight into Egypt carved in high relief (probably Italian).

== Lodge Farm, Thelnetham ==
Lodge Farm (now called Thelnetham House) was built in 1699 and was the subject of a book by the British author and critic John Middleton Murry. His book, Community Farm was an account of his time at Lodge Farm during the Second World War when he ran the farm as a commune for conscientious objectors.

== Thelnetham Windmill ==
Thelnetham Windmill is a restored 19th century tower mill and is located to the west of the village. It is open to the public on occasional weekends throughout the summer.

== Thelnetham Vineyard ==
Thelnetham Vineyard is a 3-acre (1.2 ha) vineyard on the banks of the Little Ouse which was planted in 1985 and which produces sparkling white wine.

== Trappetes' Cross ==
A 16th-century stone cross located to the west of the village near the junction of Hopton Road and Mill Road, an area formerly known as Cross Green. Only several blocks of ashlar, forming the base and a small part of the shaft, remain in the orchard belonging to The Evergreen Oak, the early 16th century former public house. Moved from fields to its present location, the original site of the Trappetes' Cross has not been identified.

The cross was bequeathed to the village by John Cole of Thelnetham in his will of 1527 in which he gave the instruction “Item 1. I will have a new crosse made accordinge to Trappetes' Crosse at the Hawelanesende and sett upp at Short Groves ende, where the Gospell ys sayde upon Ascension Even, for which I assigne xs" (10 shillings). Shortgrove Lane now runs from Hopton village to a junction with Gypsy Lane in Thelnetham and then along the parish boundary to Weathercock Farm. Cole owned land in `Longsake' Furlong adjacent to `Ratons Lane', which now seems to be called Gypsy Lane. It is likely that his cross was erected at the high point near the junction of Shortgrove and Gypsy Lane (and the former Market Lane). John Cole further directed that a certain farm-rent should be applied yearly to the purpose of providing “a bushel and halffe of malte to be browne, and a bushel of whete to be baked to fynde a drinkinge upon Ascension Even everlasting for ye parishe of Thelnetham to drinke at the Cross of Trappetes”.

Reference to the cross can still be found in the names of nearby dwellings such as Trappetes Cross Cottages and Cross Green Farm.

== See also ==
- Blo' Norton and Thelnetham Fen
- Thelnetham Windmill
- Little Ouse Headwaters Project
