= Mariscus =

Mariscus may refer to:

- Mariscus, a synonym for a genus of plants, Cyperus
- Cladium mariscus, a species of flowering plant in the family Cyperaceae
