= Little Ouse Headwaters Project =

Conservation project in east England

The Little Ouse Headwaters Project (LOHP) was set up in 2002 by local residents to promote conservation and enjoyment of the fenland habitats bordering the upper reaches of the River Little Ouse, which lies on the Norfolk-Suffolk border. The site lies between Blo' Norton in Norfolk and Thelnetham in Suffolk. It includes a number of areas including Hinderclay Fen, Blo' Norton Fen, Betty's Fen, The Frith, Blo' Norton Lowes, Blo' Norton Little Fen and Parker's Piece. The area also include parts of the Blo' Norton and Thelnetham Fen Site of Special Scientific Interest (SSSI).

The project is a registered charity and holds monthly work parties to manage the habitat of the various fens. The Little Ouse Headwaters Project won the CIWEM/RSPB Living Wetlands Award in 2006.

Both the River Waveney and the River Little Ouse have their sources at Redgrave Fen. The Waveney runs eastwards - forming the border between Norfolk and Suffolk - while the Little Ouse flows westwards and eventually joins the River Great Ouse at Denver Sluice.

== The Project ==
The LOHP has won awards for its work as a conservation organisation. These include the prestigious Living Wetlands award, and Suffolk's 'greenest county' award for community action.

== History ==
After the Second World War the course of the River Little Ouse was over-deepened which led to the drying-out of the surrounding fen and the conversion of much of the land to arable use. The ending of traditional management practices and the lowering of the water table also led to increased dehydration which caused a decline in the bio-diversity of the area. The work carried out by the Little Ouse Headwaters Project has helped to reverse these effects.

== See also ==
- Redgrave and Lopham Fen
