= Little Ouse, Cambridgeshire =

Hamlet in Cambridgeshire, England

Coordinates: 52.477°N 0.383°E

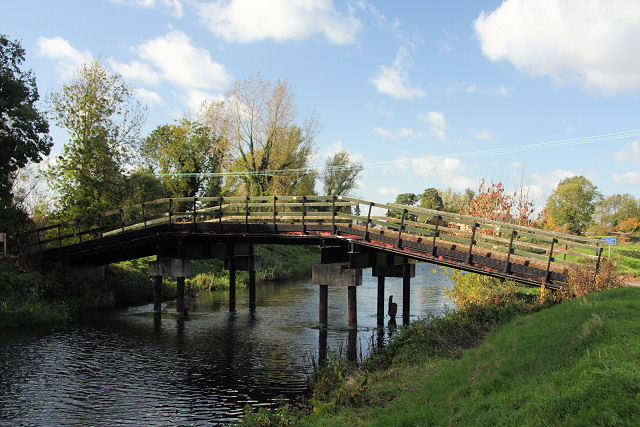
Road bridge at Little Ouse

Little Ouse is a hamlet in Littleport parish, East Cambridgeshire, England, about 3.5 miles (6 km) north-east of Littleport village. It lies on the left bank of the River Little Ouse, which here marks the boundary between Cambridgeshire and Norfolk.

The lowest trig point in Britain is near Little Ouse; it sits at 1 m below sea level.
