= Blo' Norton =

Village in Norfolk, England

Coordinates: 52.375°N 0.958°E

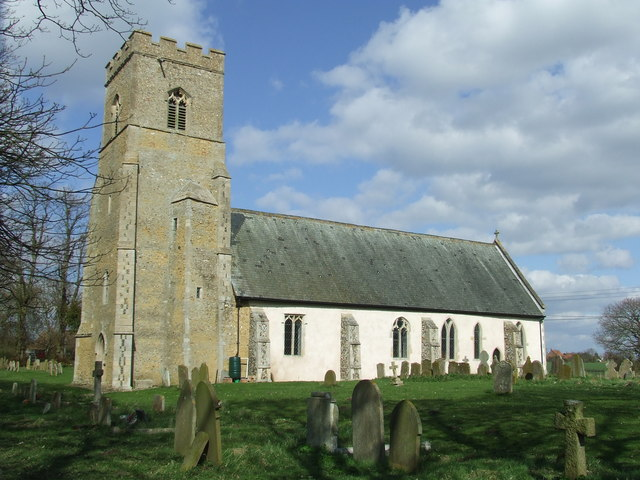
- St Andrew's Church

- Location within Norfolk
- Area: 4.62 km^{2} (1.78 sq mi)
- Population: 269 (2001 Census)
  - Density: 58/km^{2} (150/sq mi)
- OS grid reference: TM0179
- Civil parish: Blo' Norton
- District: Breckland
- Shire county: Norfolk
- Region: East
- Country: England
- Sovereign state: United Kingdom
- Post town: Diss
- Postcode district: IP22
- Dialling code: 01953
- Police: Norfolk
- Fire: Norfolk
- Ambulance: East of England
- UK Parliament: South West Norfolk
- Website: Blo' Norton Parish Council

Blo' Norton is a village and civil parish in the Breckland district of the English county of Norfolk. It is about 6.5 miles (10.5 km) west of Diss and 22 miles (35 km) south-west of Norwich along the course of the River Little Ouse.

== History ==
Blo' Norton's name is of Anglo-Saxon origin. The first record of 'Blo' added to the name is in 1291, which in Middle English may have meant 'bleak and cold or exposed' or it may have derived from ‘blae’ meaning blue, perhaps from the growth of woad plants from which a blue dye can be obtained.

In the Domesday Book, Blo' Norton is listed as a settlement of 47 households in the hundred of Guiltcross. In 1086, the village was split between the estates of William de Warenne, Roger Bigod, Bury St Edmunds Abbey and St Etheldreda's Abbey, Ely.

During the Medieval Period, Blo' Norton was significantly larger than it is today. However, the Black Death dramatically decreased the population which meant much of the village was abandoned. There is archeological evidence of the location of the deserted village to this day.

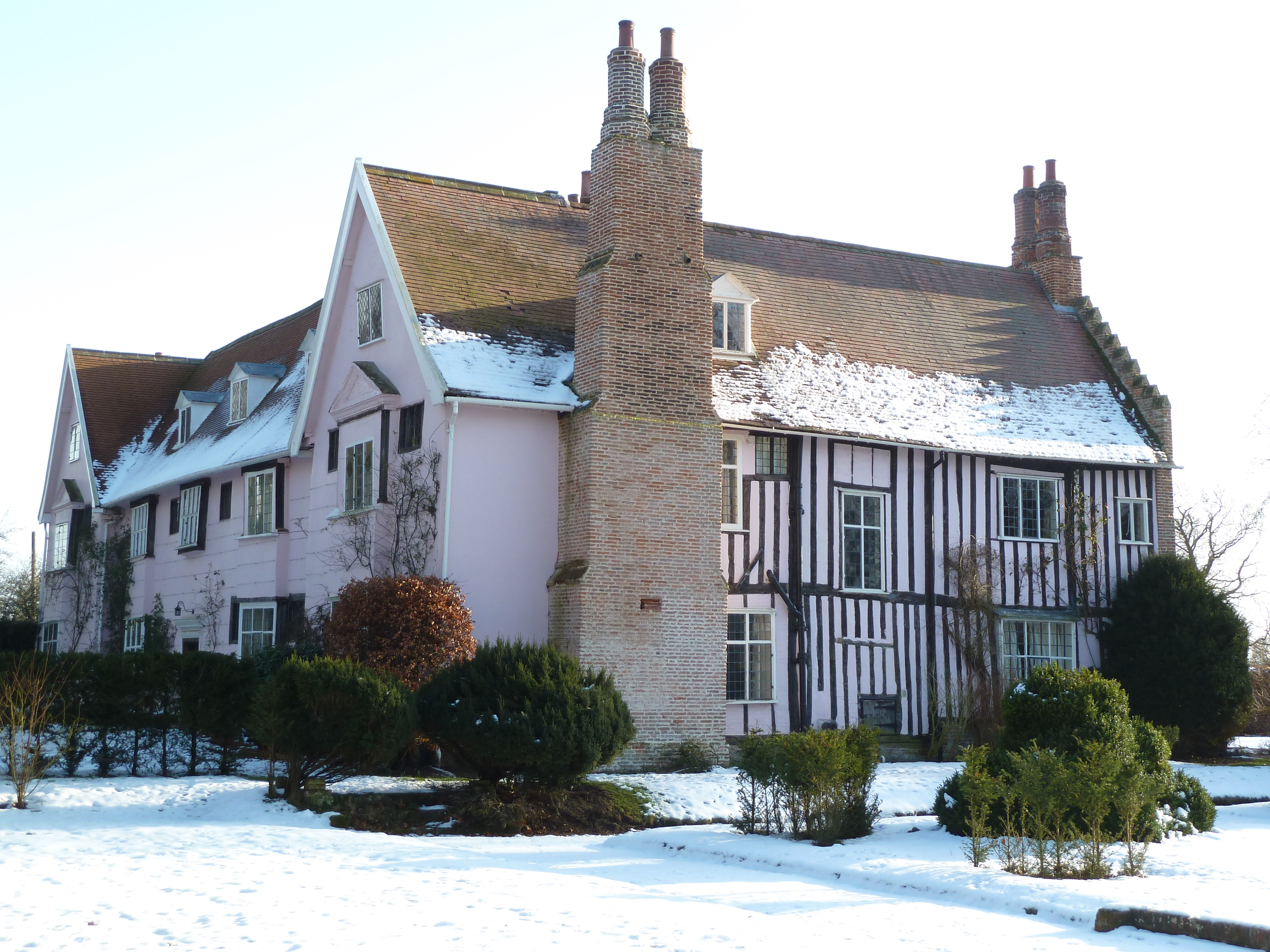
Blo' Norton Hall

== Geography ==
According to data from the 2021 census, Blo' Norton parish has a total population of 269 people which grew from 251 in the 2011 census. The village is close to the course of the River Little Ouse. Amenities within the village include a plant nursery and coffee shop.

== Church ==
Blo' Norton's parish church is dedicated to Saint Andrew and dates from the 13th-century, although its medieval furnishings have largely been removed. The church was remodelled in the 16th and 19th centuries, and features royal arms from the reign of William and Mary. The church features a stained-glass window designed and installed by William Wailes in 1863, depicting the Resurrection and Ascension of Christ. The west tower has a ring of six bells. Thomas Osborn, who had bell-foundries at Downham Market in Norfolk and St Neots in Cambridgeshire, cast five of the bells including the tenor in 1794. John Warner & Sons of Cripplegate, London cast the treble bell in 1892. St Andrew's Church has been Grade II listed since 1958.

== Governance ==
Blo' Norton is part of the electoral ward of Guiltcross for local elections and is part of the district of Breckland. It is part of the South West Norfolk parliamentary constituency.

== Blo' Norton and Thelnetham Fen ==
South of the village and along the river is the Blo' Norton and Thelnetham Fen Site of Special Scientific Interest, an important calcareous fen wetland site supporting rare plant species including black bog rush Schoenus nigricans and saw sedge Cladium mariscus. The Little Ouse Headwaters Project manages part of this area as well as surrounding wetland areas such as Hinderclay Fen and Suffolk Wildlife Trust also has a reserve on part of the site.

== Notable people ==
- Prince Frederick Duleep Singh MVO, (1868–1926) last Maharaja of the Sikh Empire and resident of Blo' Norton Hall
