= Redgrave and Lopham Fens =

Nature reserve in Norfolk and Suffolk, England

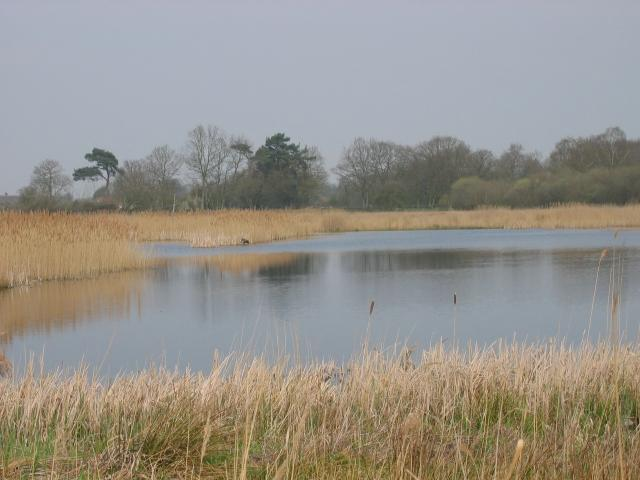
- View across Redgrave and South Lopham Fens

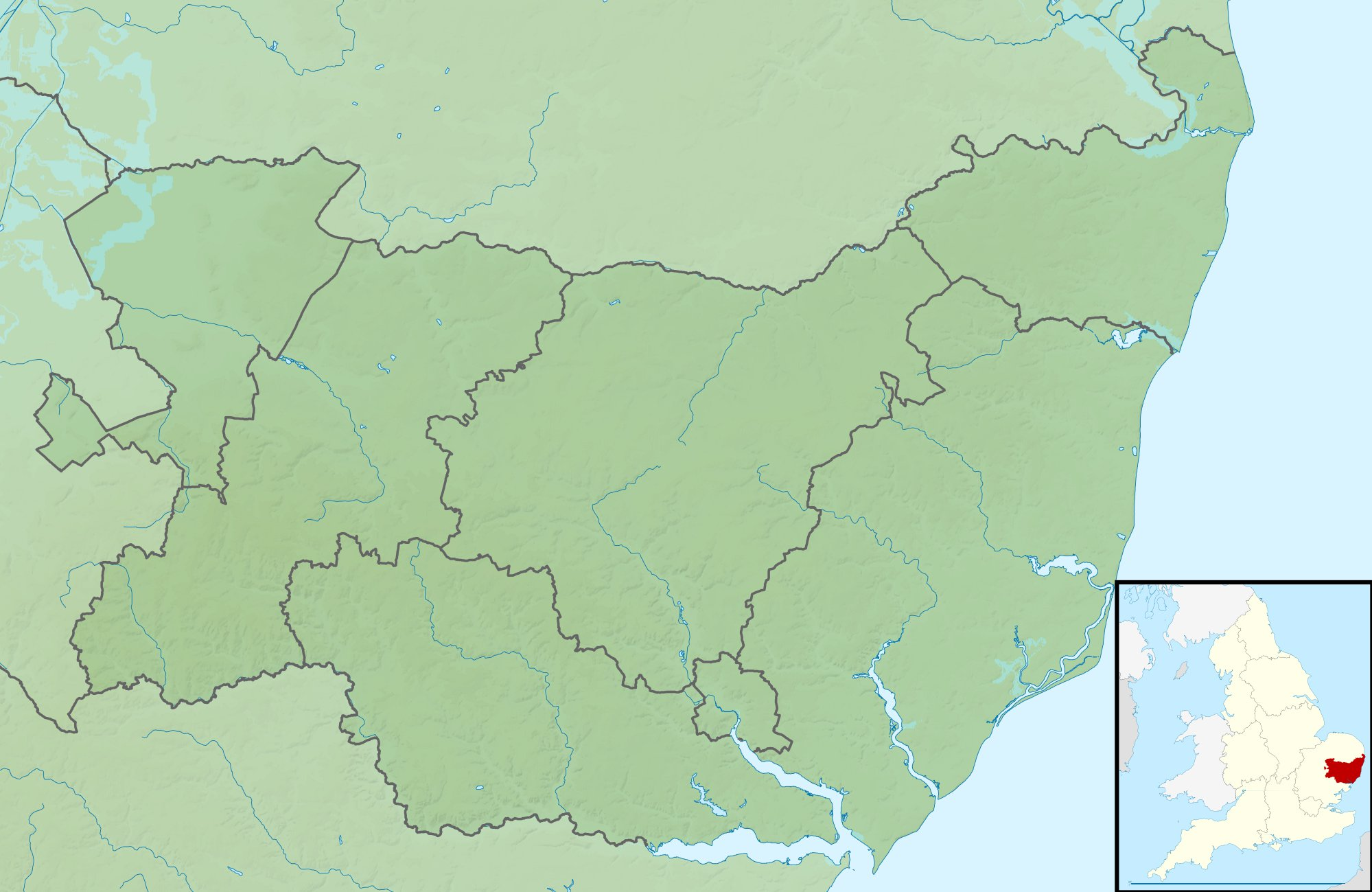
- Location within Suffolk
- Location: East of England, England, United Kingdom
- Coordinates: 52°22′49″N 01°00′57″E
- Area: 1.25 km^{2} (0.48 sq mi)
- Operator: Suffolk Wildlife Trust
- Website: SWT - Redgrave & Lopham Fen

Redgrave and Lopham Fens is a 127 hectare biological Site of Special Scientific Interest between Thelnetham in Suffolk and Diss in Norfolk. England. It is a national nature reserve, a Ramsar internationally important wetland site, a Nature Conservation Review site, Grade I, and part of the Waveney and Little Ouse Valley Fens Special Area of Conservation. It is managed by the Suffolk Wildlife Trust.

It is the largest remaining area of river valley fen in England and consists of a number of different fen types, including saw-sedge beds, as well as having areas of open water, heathland, scrub and woodland. It is also one of only three sites in the UK where the fen raft spider (Dolomedes plantarius) is known to be found.

== Ecology ==
The habitats present at Redgrave and Lopham are characteristic of areas of valley mire. This ecosystem creates a zonation of vegetation types, producing a diverse range of habitat. Dry marginal woodland becomes fen grassland, dominated by purple moor-grass, which grades into mixed fenland of reed and sedge beds. This grassland is particularly notable at Redgrave and Lopham for its areas of saw sedge (Cladium mariscus).

Into these areas of fenland protrude sandy ridges covered in heath vegetation. Without management these communities become invaded by sallow and develop into scrubland. To maintain site diversity, this has been allowed to occur in some areas of the fen.

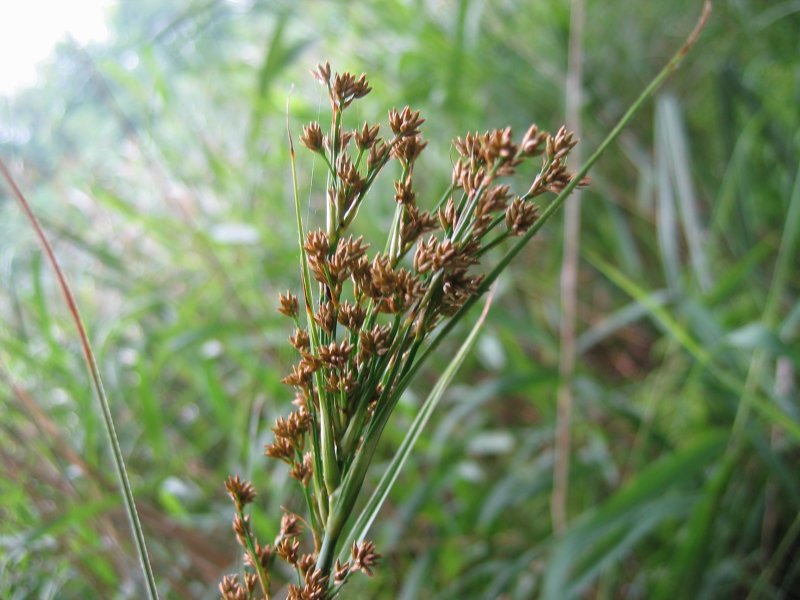
Cladium mariscus

These habitats maintain a community of plants and animals, with the site being particularly known for its diversity of invertebrate species. Surveys have identified nineteen species of dragonfly and 27 species of butterfly at the fen, which has also long been recognised for its nationally important population of the fen raft spider (Dolomedes plantarius).

Further surveys have also found 26 species of mammals, including otter, pipistrelle bats and introduced species such as the Chinese water deer. The site has also recorded 4 species of amphibian and 4 species of reptile and a 2006 survey recorded 96 species of bird visiting the fen.

== Management ==
To maintain and improve the diversity of species and quality of habitat at the site continual management is required. Suffolk Wildlife Trust employs a Site Manager and Assistant Warden to run and monitor the site but also relies on volunteers to carry out management work. Such work includes rush mowing, sedge harvesting, scrub clearance, coppicing and fence construction. The site has also introduced a successful grazing regime to reduce the cost incurred from mowing such a large area of fen. It actively manages the fen raft spider population.

=== Grazing ===
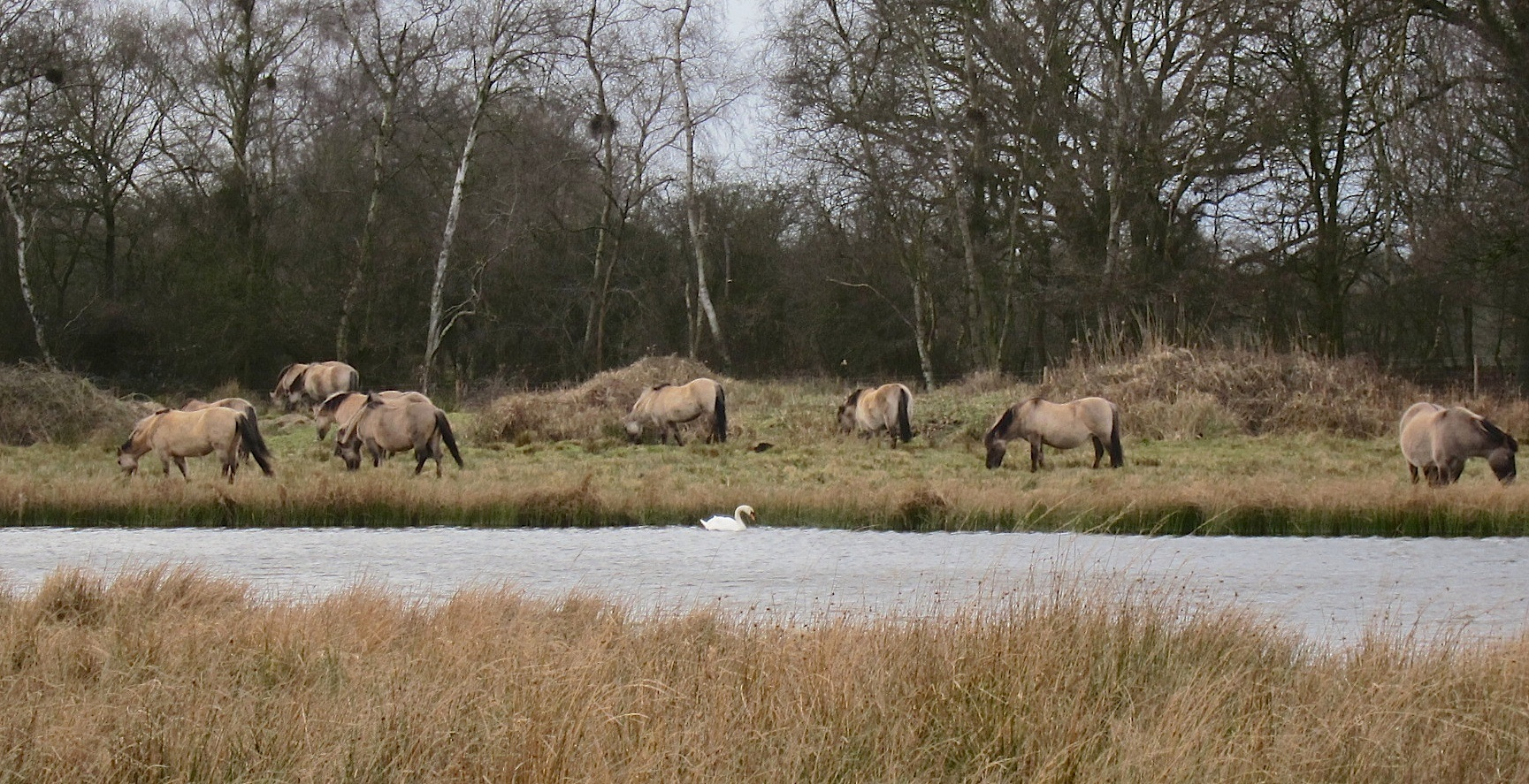
Koniks grazing wet grassland at the fen.

The site uses sheep, cattle and ponies as part of its management strategy. This has visibly benefited the fen structure and means only the larger saw sedge beds are now on a manual cutting rotation. The use of grazing has led to the emergence of a greater mosaic of vegetation and habitat types within the fen and has inhibited the expansion of scrub. Hebridean sheep owned by the trust and beef cattle from local farms graze on the dryer areas of scrub, heath and fen margins and help prevent the expansion of scrub. In 1995 the reserve introduced a herd of Polish Konik ponies to graze the wetter areas of the fen. They were chosen over native breeds for their hardiness and ability to graze in very wet conditions. The success of the Konik ponies has led to their use for grazing in other nature reserves in the UK and on the Broads. The cattle and Konik are usually kept on the fen between April and December which avoids the wettest and most barren months of the year.

=== Fen raft spider ===
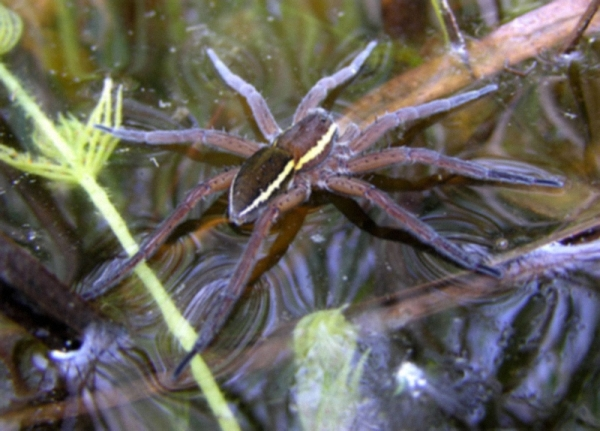
A female fen raft spider at Redgrave and Lopham Fens

Redgrave and Lopham Fens was the first site in the UK at which a population of the fen raft spider (Dolomedes plantarius) was recorded. Following their discovery in 1956 a number of new pools were dug to encourage population expansion. However, water extraction from the borehole and a series of droughts in the 1980s reduced the population to only two isolated areas on the reserve. Throughout this period irrigation of the pools inhabited by the spider enabled the continuation of the population.

The removal of the borehole in 1999 was expected to trigger an increase in population as water levels returned to normal. However, a study carried out in 2006 showed that no noticeable change had occurred. The population of the fen raft spider remains small and restricted in distribution. Recommendations for future management of the population include increasing the depths of turf pool, creating more pool habitats and greater, more focused use of water management in the reserve.

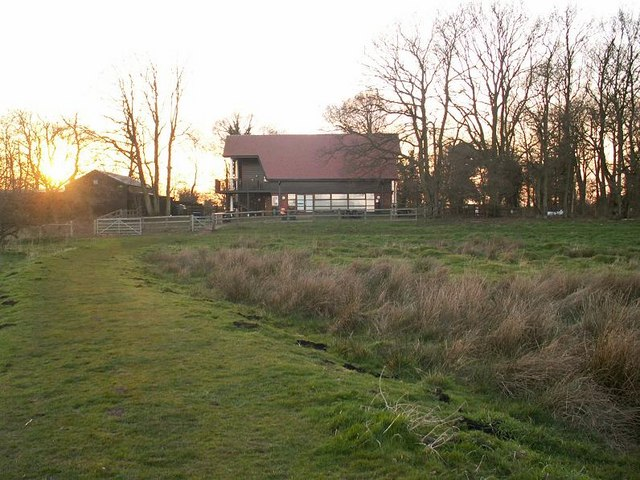
The visitor centre and picnic area at Redgrave and Lopham Fens

== Access and facilities ==
The reserve is open to the public all year round. It has an Education Centre which it uses to host family activity days, school trips and adult education courses. There is a picnic area and toilet facilities. It has three dedicated nature trails of 2, 3 and 4.5 km lengths, some of which are accessible by wheelchair. . .

== History ==
=== Pre-1959 ===
Redgrave and Lopham Fens lies at the headwaters of the Waveney and Little Ouse rivers and had for centuries provided natural resources for the local population. This activity created and maintained the various habitats of the fen. The cutting of peat for fuel lead to the creation of open pools edged in reedbeds and the pathways between them became species-rich fen meadows. Sedge and reed were cut for thatching, furze and other vegetation was removed for livestock bedding and firewood. Cattle and other livestock were also grazed on the meadow, heath and other marginal land around the fens. This removed any invading species, prevented ecological succession from occurring and preserved the diversity of the fenland. However, with the industrialisation of farming and the wider use of fossil fuels the traditional use and management of the fen began to decline.

In 1954 Redgrave and Lopham Fens was given the status as a Site of Special Scientific Interest (SSSI) due to the nationally important presence of the fen raft spider and the diversity of its fenland.

=== 1959-1991 ===
In 1959 a borehole was drilled at the fen to provide drinking water for the local population, with a capacity to take 3,600m^{3} of water every day from the underlying aquifer. This diverted water from the springs that fed the fen and the water table began to fall. This led to a change in the fen's hydrology in the early 1960s as it went from a year-round water supply to alternating summer drought and winter floods. With a net loss of water this caused the fen to begin to dry out.

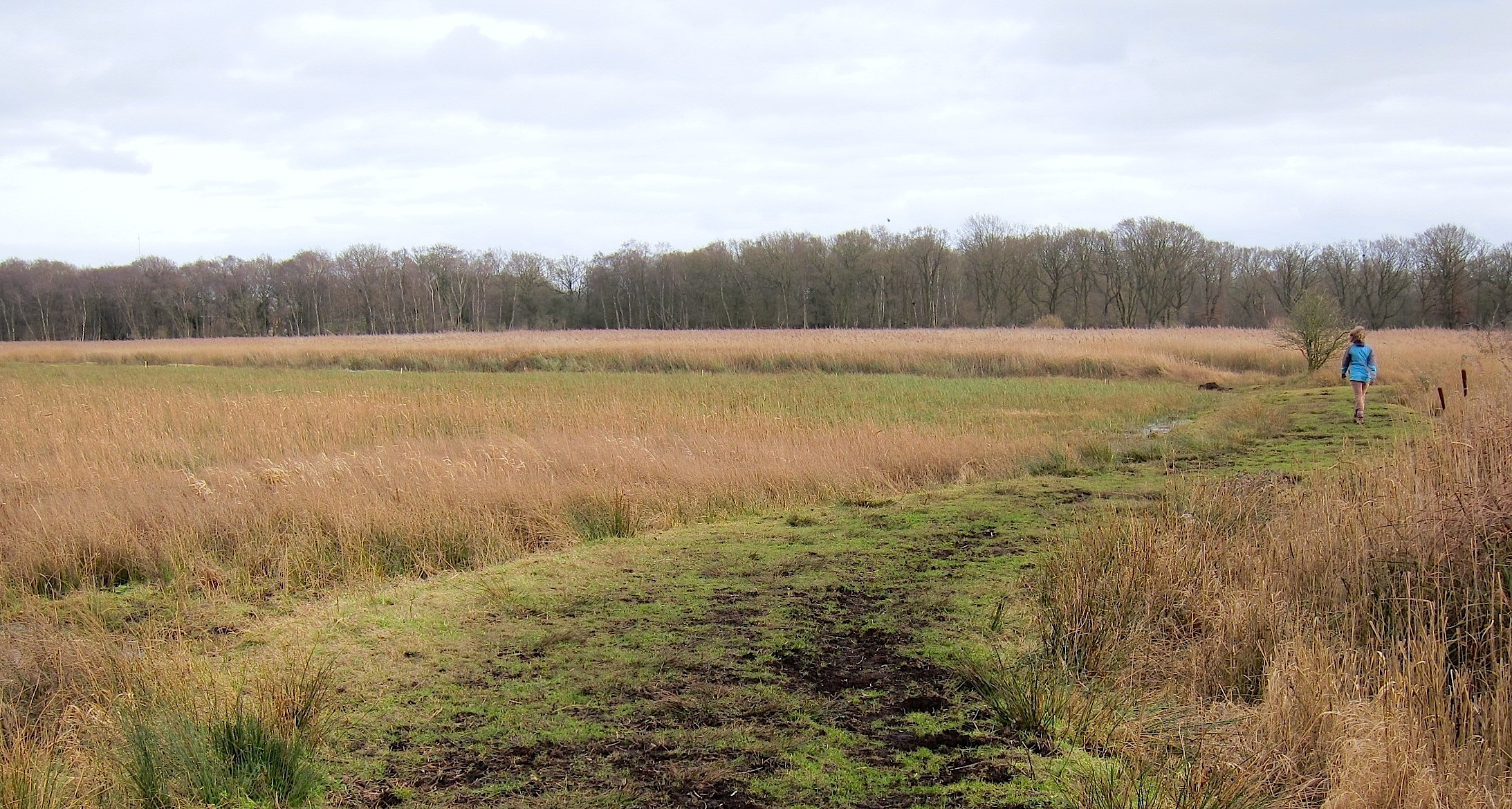
The Waveney Trail. A raised footpath that separates areas of fenland within the reserve.

The loss of water and lack of management led to the degradation of the fen, and scrub began to invade large areas. In 1961 the Suffolk Wildlife Trust gained control of the site but insufficient resources meant the large scale work they wished to carry out to return it to its previous state could not be achieved; the condition of the overall fen continued to decline.

=== 1991-present ===
In the early 1990s Redgrave and Lopham Fens gained wider recognition for its importance. Thus it was designated a Ramsar site in 1991 and gained national nature reserve status in 1993. At this time the Environment Agency undertook studies to determine the extent of damage to the fen and how restoration could best be carried out. This led to a large scale and internationally recognised restoration project, costing approximately £3.4 million.

== Restoration project ==
The restoration of the reserve was split into three key areas: the relocation of the borehole, the restoration of the river and the restoration of the fen, with a budget of £2.2 million, £0.4 million and £0.8 million respectively. The European Commission funded 50% of this cost from the LIFE Fund.

=== Borehole relocation ===
In order to re-establish the original fen water regime it was recommended that the borehole removing water from the system be relocated and that the new borehole provide sufficient water without damaging the fenland. To fit these requirements a large search for a suitable site was carried out with many test sites drilled and tested. Eventually a site was located 3 km southeast of the reserve and planning and construction of the new borehole was carried out at a cost of £1.2 million. This was the first time a public water borehole was relocated on solely environmental grounds.

The onsite borehole was shut down in July 1999 and within one month significant increases in water levels were recorded. By summer 2002 the maximum groundwater recharge level was believed to have been reached and the hydrological recovery closely followed modeling predictions. This return to natural levels of water supply has helped solve many ecological problems, with peat soils and reed beds now having sufficient water throughout the year. The many old peat cuttings have also filled with water, creating small pools filled with vegetation at various stages of succession throughout the reserve.

=== River restoration ===
The reserve is divided by the River Waveney and the river can have a great impact on the fen ecology if mismanaged. The restoration project aimed to raise the water level within the river, restore the river ecology to its previous state and improve its habitats. To achieve this two fully adjustable sluice gates were introduced to the river course. These would allow direct control of water levels within the fen and protect the site from flooding or drought events. The banks of the river were also reworked to create greater areas of marginal habitat and the shallow bank shelves that are of interest to wildlife such as water voles. The material removed from the bank was reformed to create flood defense levees alongside the river.

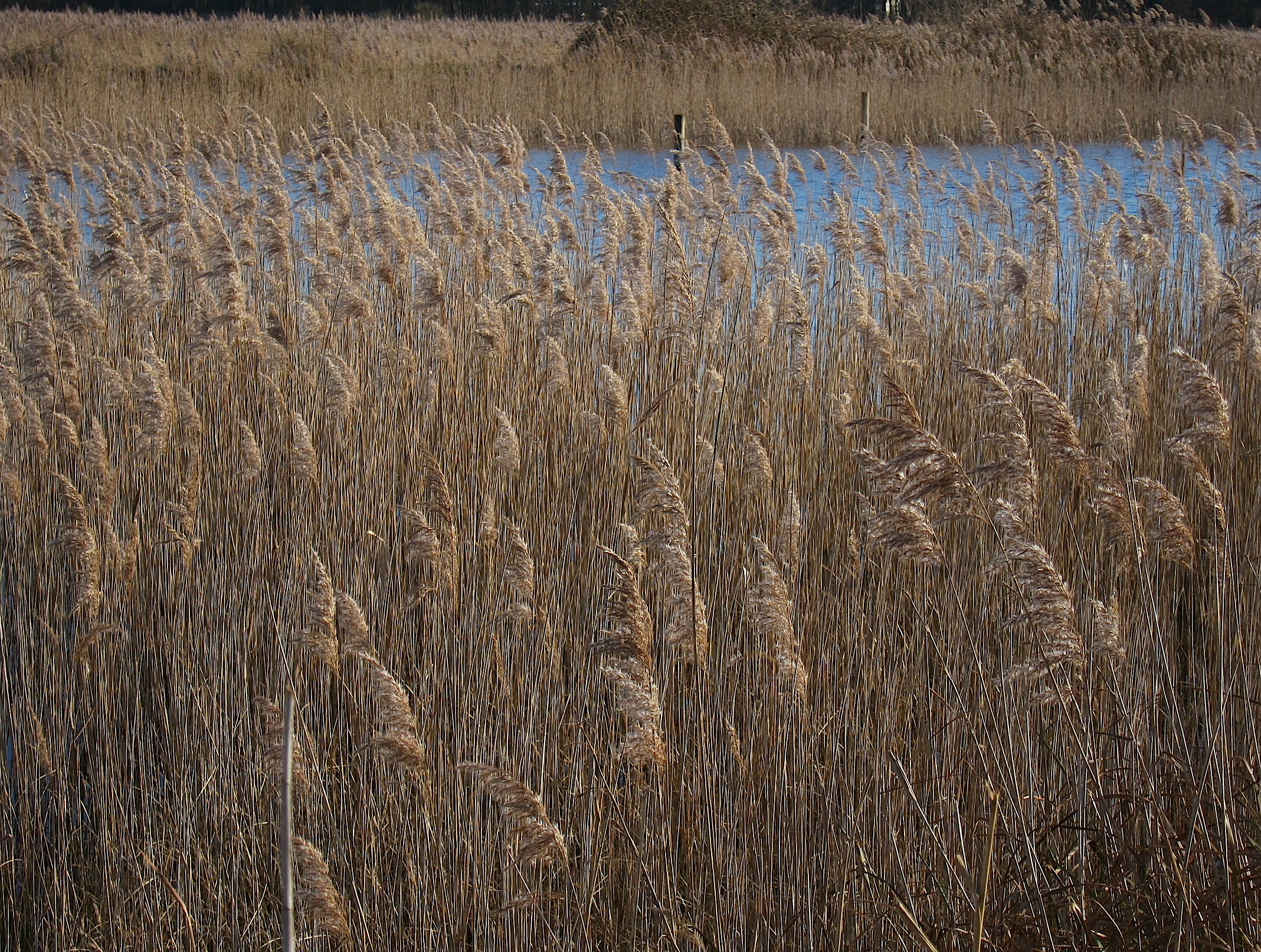
Restored Phragmites reed bed and pond

=== Fen restoration ===
The third stage of the project was to recreate the conditions that would allow the most important fen communities to become re-established. This would involve a number of different tasks but mainly focused on scrub and tree clearance and peat stripping operations. Around 80 hectares of wood and scrub were identified for clearance, all of which has now been removed and has opened up land to be reclaimed by the fen habitat. Due to the lack of water over the years large areas of peat had degraded. To restore the fen to its previous state the decision was made to strip off the peat down to a level where it was undamaged and allow natural growth from that point. By 2002 around 250,000 tonnes of peat had been removed and a number of large pools surrounded by reed bed were created. Eventually the annual growth and dieback of the fen vegetation will restart the process of forming new peat.
