= Thomas Fowle =

Church of England clergyman and academic

Thomas Fowle (c. 1530 – after 1597) was a Church of England clergyman, Fellow of St John's College, Cambridge, rector of Redgrave and Hinderclay, Suffolk, and prebendary of Norwich Cathedral.

He was briefly tutor to Edward de Vere, the future Earl of Oxford, and was later chaplain to Sir Nicholas Bacon.

== Life ==
Fowle was educated at the University of Cambridge, where he matriculated from St John's in 1547, graduated BA in 1549/50 and proceeded MA in 1553. He was elected a Fellow of St John's, but under Queen Mary I was ejected. He then served in or near the City of London as a minister to a secret congregation of Protestants.

On 4 May 1558, Fowle began to receive a salary of ten pounds a year as tutor to the young Edward de Vere, then aged eight. In November of the same year, de Vere matriculated as a fellow-commoner of Queens' College, Cambridge.

Soon after the accession of Queen Elizabeth I in 1558, Fowle was restored to his fellowship at St John's. On 4 November 1562 he was collated as Rector of Aldham, Essex, but had resigned before 19 November 1563.

On 22 July 1563, he was installed as second prebendary of Norwich Cathedral, when it was noted that he lived at Redgrave in Suffolk, where he was both rector of the parish and chaplain to Lord Keeper Sir Nicholas Bacon.

From 1561 to 1566, he was also Rector of Hinderclay in Suffolk.

On 4 January 1569/70, Fowle became a senior fellow of St John's College. In 1570, he was part of a group of prebendaries of Norwich who "disaffected to the established order as regards matters ecclesiastical, entered into the choir of that cathedral, forcibly broke down the organs and committed certain other disorders of the like outrageous character". It was also said of him that he never went to Norwich except to collect the stipend due to him.

In 1572, he was a member of a commission against Roman Catholic recusants in Norfolk, and in 1573 with John Handson and John Grundye he was appointed by John Parkhurst, the Bishop of Norwich, to take charge of "religious exercises termed prophesyings" at Bury St Edmunds. Soon afterwards, such exercises were forbidden on the authority of Queen Elizabeth.

He held his prebend at Norwich until 1581, when he resigned. He continued as rector of Redgrave until 1597.

Fowle's will mentions sons named Nicholas and Thomas. In 1586, a Thomas Fowle was Master of the school at Botesdale in Suffolk.
