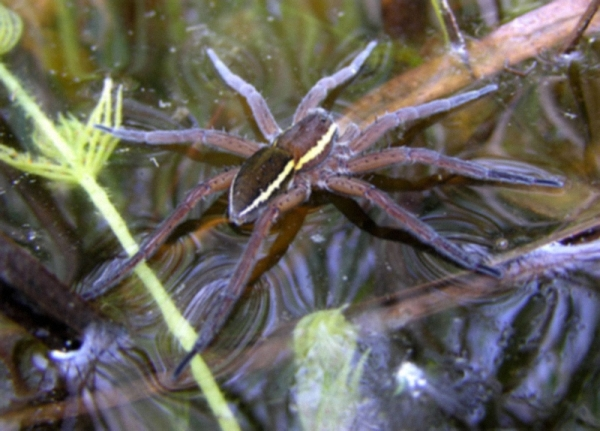
- An adult female great raft spider on the surface of a water pool

Conservation status
- Vulnerable (IUCN 2.3)

Scientific classification
- Kingdom: Animalia
- Phylum: Arthropoda
- Subphylum: Chelicerata
- Class: Arachnida
- Order: Araneae
- Infraorder: Araneomorphae
- Family: Dolomedidae
- Genus: Dolomedes
- Species: D. plantarius

Binomial name
- Dolomedes plantarius (Clerck, 1757)
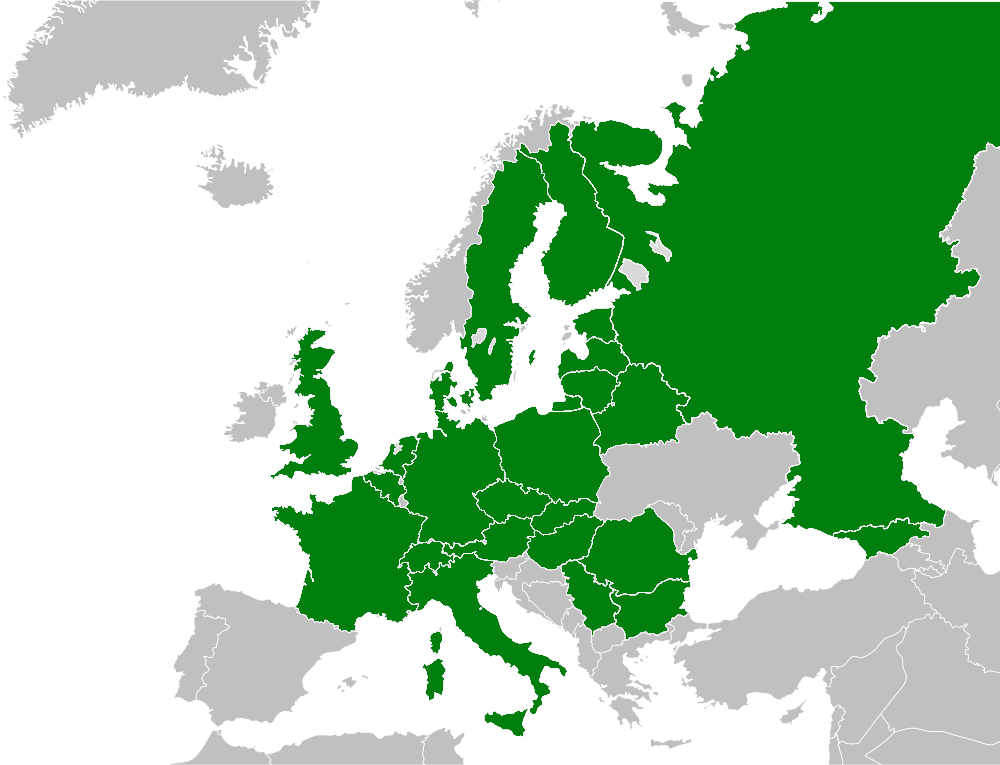
- Countries with a recorded population of D. plantarius

Synonyms
- Araneus plantarius Aranea viridata Dolomedes riparius

= Great raft spider =

Species of spider

The great raft spider or fen raft spider (Dolomedes plantarius) is a European species of spider in the family Dolomedidae. Like other Dolomedes spiders, it is semiaquatic, hunting its prey on the surface of water. It occurs mainly in neutral to alkaline, unpolluted water of fens and grazing marsh.

== Taxonomy ==
The species was first described by arachnologist Carl Alexander Clerck in 1757 as Araneus plantarius. Its genus was reclassified by Pierre André Latreille in 1804 to Dolomedes. The species has also been described under the name Aranea viridata by Müller and as Dolomedes riparius by Hahn. The species is currently recognised as Dolomedes plantarius and has two widely recognised common names: the great raft spider and the fen raft spider.

== Morphology ==
D. plantarius is a large species within its range. Adult females can have bodies of slightly over 20mm in length with a span of 70mm including their legs. It is typically black or brown in colouration with white or cream stripes along the sides of the body. It is very similar in appearance to the closely related raft spider Dolomedes fimbriatus with which it is often misidentified.

== Ecology and behaviour ==
=== Habitat ===
The great raft spider, as with most other Dolomedes species, is a semi-aquatic spider. It inhabits lowland fen and grazing marsh areas and is dependent on the presence of standing or slow moving neutral to alkaline water. Within these areas it can be found on the margins of pools or ditches. Emergent vegetation is highly important for use as perches for hunting and basking and to support nursery webs. As a warmth loving species they avoid areas where water surfaces are shaded.

=== Diet and feeding ===
Great raft spiders are predatory and hunt from perches at the water's edge. They primarily feed on aquatic invertebrates such as pond skaters, dragonfly larvae and smaller aquatic spiders, as well as small fish. They will also feed on drowning terrestrial invertebrates and have been known to catch small vertebrates such as sticklebacks and tadpoles. To hunt aquatic prey they have developed a sensory system of chaetae, a covering of sensory hairs on its legs. These are used to detect the vibrations made as prey hits the surface or moves through the water. It will typically position itself with the back legs on a plant stem and the front legs on the water surface to be able to detect any prey. When prey is found the spider is able to run across the surface of the water to reach it by use of surface tension. They are also known to hunt underwater by running down the stems of plants to reach prey, this can also be used to avoid capture by predators.

=== Life cycle and reproduction ===
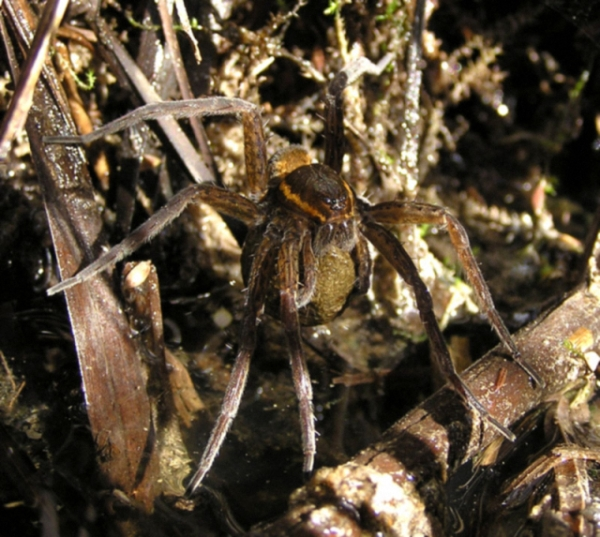
A female great raft spider with egg sac

Water is essential to the whole life cycle of the great raft spider. The spiders will live for two and a half years. As juveniles they will hibernate over the winter and will mature into adults during their final spring. In the UK, adults will usually have two breeding attempts between July and September.

The chaetae sensory system is used to help find a mate and courtship is carried out on the water. The male will slowly and carefully approach the female while tapping the water surface with its legs. When they are close they perform a slow bobbing of the body. If accepted the mating is brief and over in seconds.

The female will lay several hundred eggs in a silk sac, about 10mm across, which they carry under their bodies for around three weeks. During this time she will periodically dip the sac into water to prevent the eggs from drying out. She will also locate a suitable nest site amongst the emergent vegetation, this will usually be between 10 and 100 cm above the water. Shortly prior to hatching she will construct a tent-like nursery web within which she can guard the young until they disperse into the surroundings, usually five to nine days after hatching.

If a second brood is attempted later in the summer these are usually smaller and less likely to be successful. Courtship and mating usually takes place early in the season and adult males will die shortly after with most dead by late July. Females will survive until the end of the summer.

== Distribution ==
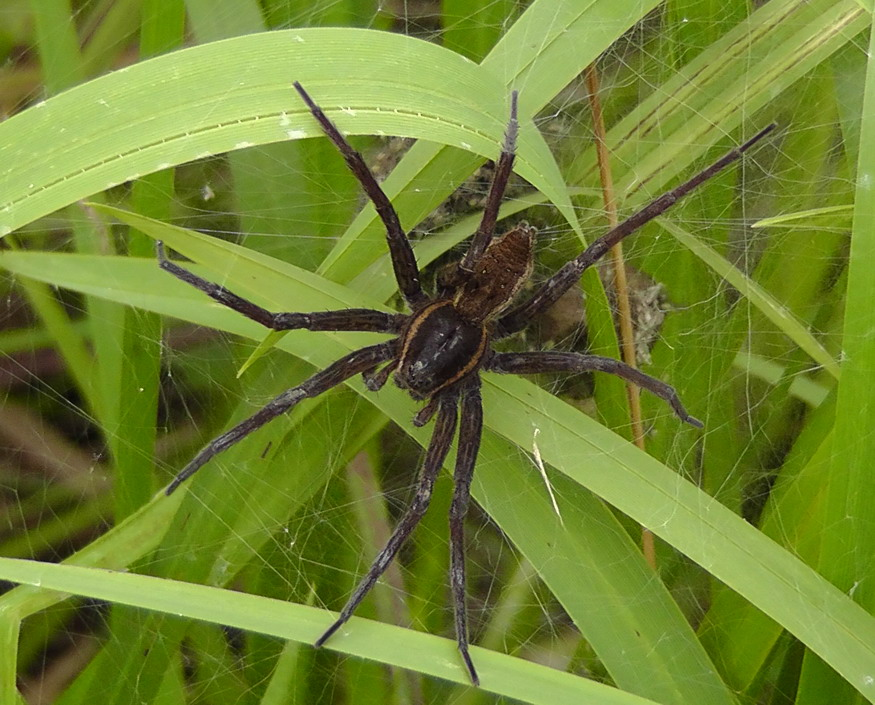
A male great raft spider in Latvia

Populations of the great raft spider are found throughout Europe and Russia, in Austria, Belarus, Belgium, Bulgaria, Czech Republic, Denmark, Estonia, Finland, France, Georgia (country), Germany, Hungary, Italy, Latvia, Lithuania, Norway, the Netherlands, Poland, Romania, Serbia, Slovakia, Sweden, Switzerland and the United Kingdom.

In 1956 an outlying population was discovered for the first time in the United Kingdom at Redgrave and Lopham Fen by arachnologist Eric Duffey. A further two populations have since been identified at the Pevensey Levels in East Sussex by Peter Kirby in 1988 and near Swansea, South Wales, by Mike Clark in 2003. The species was also recorded in the 1960s at Sound Heath in Cheshire. The lack of historical record makes it very difficult to estimate the extent of its decline or explain the widely separated current distribution in the UK.

== Conservation ==
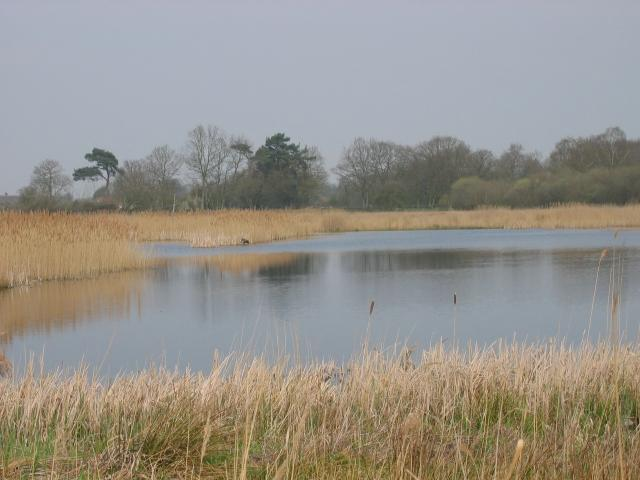
Cladium reed beds at Redgrave and Lopham Fen typical of D. plantarius habitat

Although the species is widely distributed in Europe, under-recording and confusion over identification make assessment of its status difficult. Populations are known to have declined substantially throughout its range particularly in western and central areas but remaining populations are believed to be well established in Scandinavia and the Baltic States. These reductions in population are primarily due to the degradation and loss of habitat. The great raft spider is listed as a vulnerable species on the IUCN Red List.

=== United Kingdom ===
The great raft spider has only been identified at twelve sites in the UK. Due to this extreme rarity it is listed as vulnerable, and was listed as endangered prior to discovery of the third site and reassessment of its status following changes to assessment criteria. It is classified as Nationally Rare. It is protected under Schedule 5 of the Wildlife and Countryside Act 1981 in England and Wales, and the Nature Conservation (Scotland) Act 2004 in Scotland, and was provided a Species Action Plan in 1999. Revised targets were published in 2006 with reports on targets published in 2002, 2005 and 2008. When the UK Biodiversity Action Plan was succeeded by the UK Post-2010 Biodiversity Framework, the great raft spider was listed as a 'species of principal importance' under Section 41 of the Natural Environment and Rural Communities Act 2006. Principal threats to the species in the UK are identified as water abstraction, inappropriate ditch management, deterioration in water quality and the loss of suitable wetland habitat.

Original targets aimed to: Increase the range of the population by ten-fold and to increase the population density to a mean maximum of around 15 individuals per pool at Redgrave and Lopham Fen. To maintain the density and range of the fen raft spider on the Pevensey Levels and to introduce populations to two suitable new sites by 2010. In 2006, these were revised to: Increase the range of the spider to 13 Ha of habitat occupied 3 years in 5 by 2010 and to 65 Ha by 2020 at Redgrave & Lopham Fen. To prevent an overall decrease in range at Pevensey Levels at any time from levels recorded in 1990 and to increase sites with sustainable populations by 6 by 2010 and 12 by 2020.

The spider was first identified in the UK in 1956, at Redgrave and Lopham Fen. Following their discovery, a number of new pools were dug to encourage population expansion. However, water extraction from the nearby borehole and a series of droughts in the 1980s reduced the population to only two isolated areas on the reserve. Throughout this period irrigation of the pools inhabited by the spider enabled the continuation of the population. The removal of the borehole in 1999 was expected to trigger an increase in population as water levels returned to normal. However, a study carried out in 2006 showed that no noticeable change had occurred. The population of the fen raft spider at the site remains small and restricted in distribution, but stable. Recommendations for future management of the population include increasing the depths of turf pool, creating more pool habitats and greater, more focused use of water management in the reserve.

A second population, which had previously been believed to be the similar Dolomedes fimbriatus, was identified in 1988 at the Pevensey Levels in East Sussex. A 1992 survey estimated the population at over 3000 adult females in summer. This population is considered stable and conservation efforts at the site have focused on maintaining this level. A population has been found at a small artificial pond site which derived from Pevensey material. A review of the Pevensey population since its last count has been recommended.

The spider was first found in South Wales in 2003 in the disused Tennant Canal at Pant-y-Sais Fen. Surveying found a stable population as well as identifying further occurrences at the nearby Crymlyn Bog and in connecting wetlands but the full range of the spider is not fully known. This due to the difficulty of surveying work in wetland terrain and problems with identification. The habitat at the site is considered good enough for the population not to be declining.

==== Reintroduction ====
In October 2010 the first introduction of a great raft spider population into a new site in the UK was carried out in a joint project by Natural England and Suffolk Wildlife Trust and supported by a grant from the BBC Wildlife Fund. The project saw around 3000 spiderlings bred and reared by Dr. Helen Smith and the John Innes Centre, 1600 of which were released into suitable dykes at the Suffolk Wildlife Trust Castle Marshes nature reserve. The site is part of the Suffolk Broads and lies 50 kilometres (31 mi) downstream, from Redgrave and Lopham fen, between Lowestoft and Beccles. Work was carried out to improve the ditch network at the site to prepare for the reintroduction and provide optimal habitat for the new spider population.

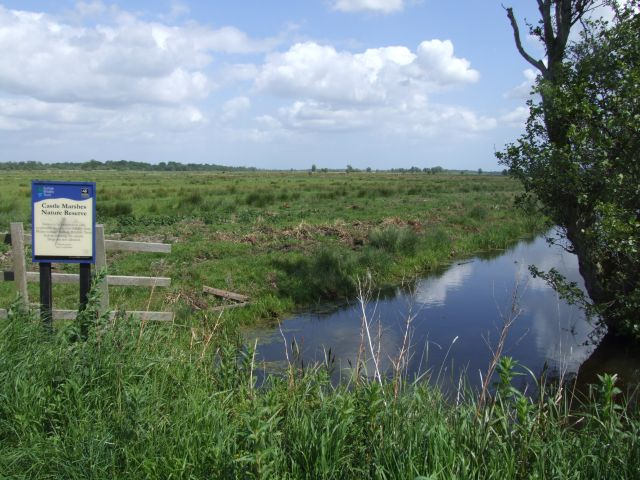
Castle Marshes nature reserve, the site of the first great raft spider reintroduction in the UK

The spiderlings were bred from adults from both the Redgrave and Lopham fen and Pevensey Levels subpopulations. This was to increase the genetic variability of the new population and increase its chances of survival. Each spiderling was hand reared in separate test tubes and fed with fruit flies. If the new population successfully establishes itself it will be one of only four great raft spider populations in the UK. Another population of spiders was also introduced at the same time to Redgrave and Lopham fen to support the small population already present.

As of 2024, the spiders are reportedly making a comeback, particularly in East Anglia.

=== Norway ===
In July 2013, a wildlife enthusiast found a suspected specimen in Rakkestad, Østfold County in Norway. Several experts have confirmed the descriptions as belonging to the great raft spider. This would make it the first confirmed sighting of the species within Norway.
