= Grazing marsh =

Grazing marsh is a British Isles term for flat, marshy grassland in polders. It consists of large grass fields separated by fresh or brackish ditches, and is often important for its wildlife.

== History ==
Grazing marshes were created from medieval times by building sea walls (earth banks) across tidal mudflats and salt marsh to make polders (though the term "polder" is little used in Britain). Polders in Britain are mostly drained by gravity, rather than active pumping. The original tidal drainage channels were augmented by new ditches, and flap valves in the sea walls let water drain out at low tide and prevent the sea or tidal river from entering at high tide. Constructing polders in this way is called inning or reclaiming from the sea.

Grazing marshes have been made in most lowland estuaries in Britain, often leaving only the river channel and the lowest part of the estuary tidal. In a few cases (such as Newtown Harbour on the Isle of Wight, and Pagham Harbour in West Sussex) the sea walls have been breached, and the estuaries have returned to a tidal state. Grazing marshes have also been made on low-lying open coasts.

Many grazing marshes were inned in stages, and the old sea walls (called counter walls) may be found marooned far from the current sea wall. Land levels on either side of a counter wall often differ by several metres. Paradoxically, the lower side is the land inned earlier, because sediment continued to build up on the side that remained tidal.

== Wildlife ==
Wintering wildfowl are characteristic of grazing marshes, often including large flocks of Eurasian wigeon, brent goose, white-fronted goose and Bewick's swan. Many of these birds are hunted by predators such as peregrine and marsh harrier.

In spring, waders such as common redshank, Eurasian curlew, snipe, and northern lapwing breed.

The ditches often have a range of salinity, depending on how close to the sea wall they are. The more saline ditches host specialist brackish-water plants and animals. These include, for example, the rare brackish amphipod Gammarus insensibilis and sea club-rush (Bolboschoenus maritimus). Fresher ditches may support rare animals, such as the great silver water beetle (Hydrophilus piceus) and the great raft spider (Dolomedes plantarius), and a wide range of pondweeds (Potamogeton and relatives).

The grassland vegetation usually has a fairly small number of species, but those present are often scarce elsewhere, such as sea arrowgrass (Triglochin maritimum), divided sedge (Carex divisa) and strawberry clover (Trifolium fragiferum).

== Conservation ==
Many grazing marshes have been converted into arable land, often using pumped drainage to lower the water levels enough to grow crops, though most are used for grazing cattle. The low ditch levels and agricultural runoff combine to remove much of the aquatic wildlife, although the arable fields may still be used by some wintering wildfowl.

Some areas of grazing marsh and other polder land have been used to recreate tidal habitats by a process of managed retreat.

Many of the larger areas of grazing marsh bear nature conservation designations, including Site of Special Scientific Interest, Special Protection Area, Special Area of Conservation and Ramsar Site.

== Examples of grazing marsh ==
- Pevensey Levels in East Sussex
- Romney Marsh in Kent and East Sussex
- The Somerset Levels
- The Thames Estuary marshes in Kent and Essex
- Marshes along the River Wantsum in Kent—formerly the Wantsum Channel separating the Isle of Thanet from the mainland
- Moss Valley, Derbyshire
