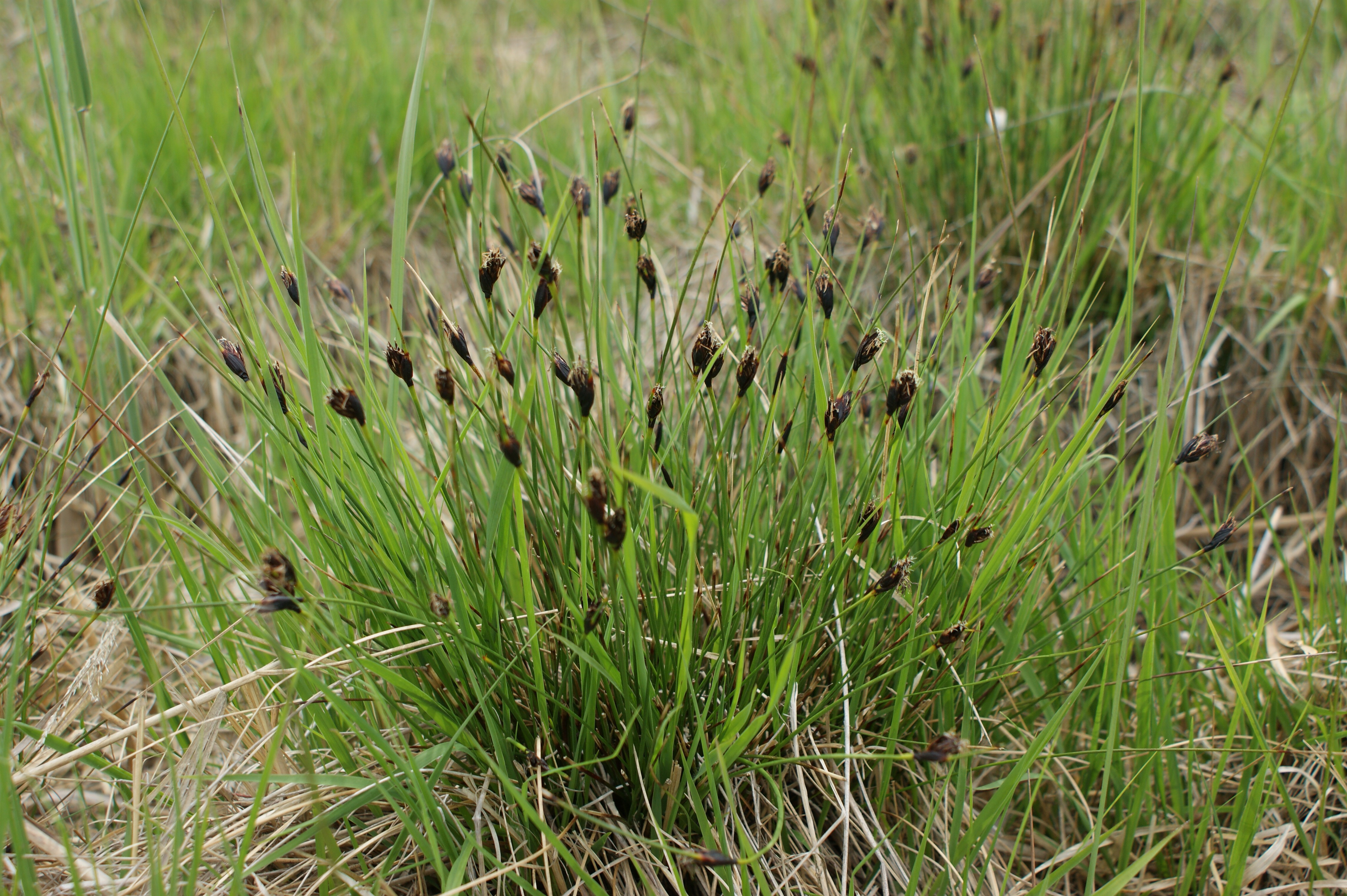

Conservation status
- Least Concern (IUCN 3.1)

Scientific classification
- Kingdom: Plantae
- Clade: Tracheophytes
- Clade: Angiosperms
- Clade: Monocots
- Clade: Commelinids
- Order: Poales
- Family: Cyperaceae
- Genus: Schoenus
- Species: S. nigricans

Binomial name
- Schoenus nigricans L.

= Schoenus nigricans =

Species of grass-like plant

Schoenus nigricans is a species of sedge known by the common names black bog-rush and black sedge. It is native to Eurasia, parts of Africa, Australia, and southern North America, including Mexico and the southernmost United States.

== Description ==
This perennial plant grows in low, tight clumps 20 to 70 centimeters tall, with threadlike leaves bearing wide, dark brown ligules. The inflorescence is a small, flattened cluster of dark spikelets. The fruit is an achene coated in a hard, white shell.

== Habitat ==
S. nigricans grows in many types of wetlands and other moist and alkaline habitat, including marshes, springs, seeps, peat bogs, heath, and alkali flats.

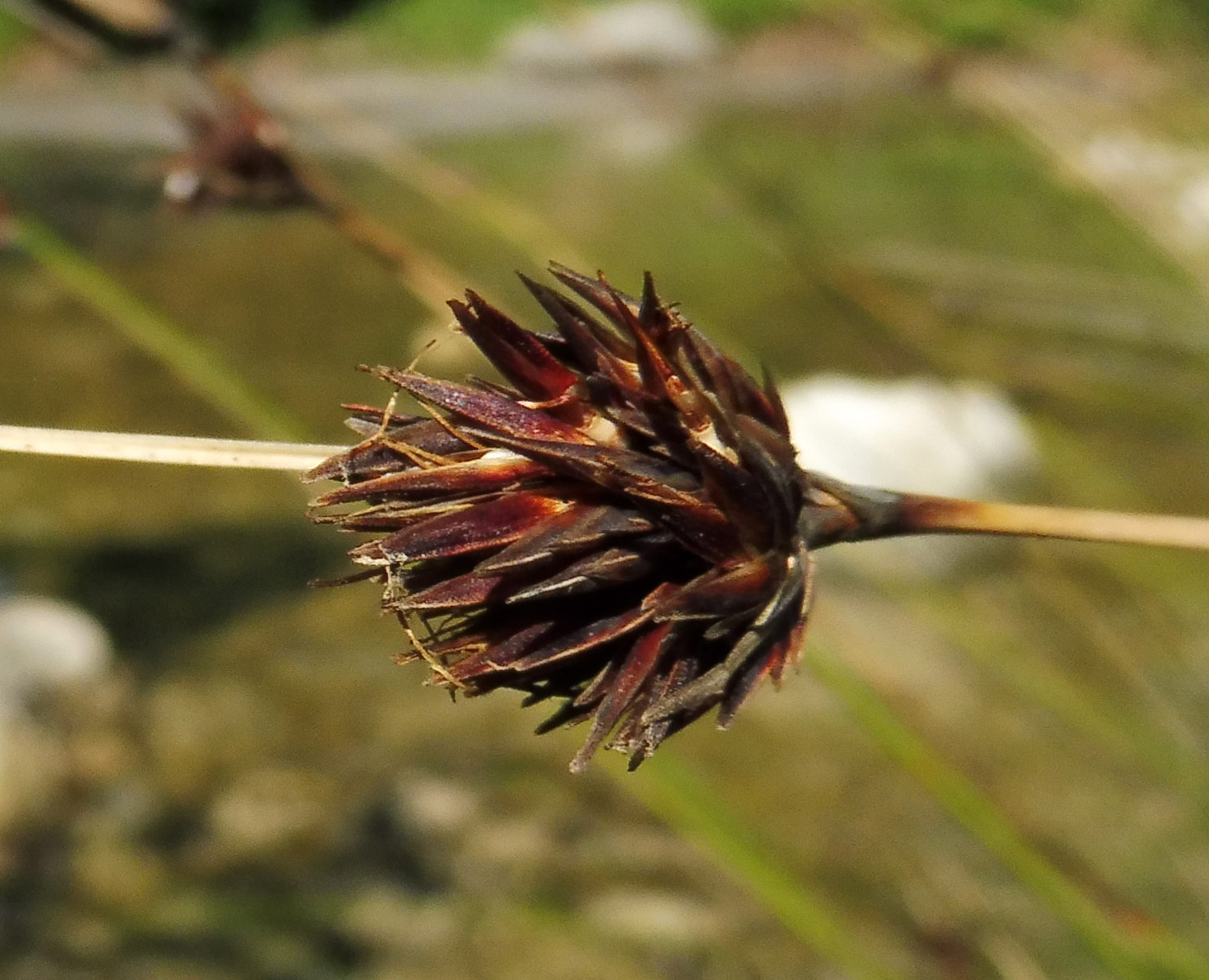
Detail of mature fruiting head
