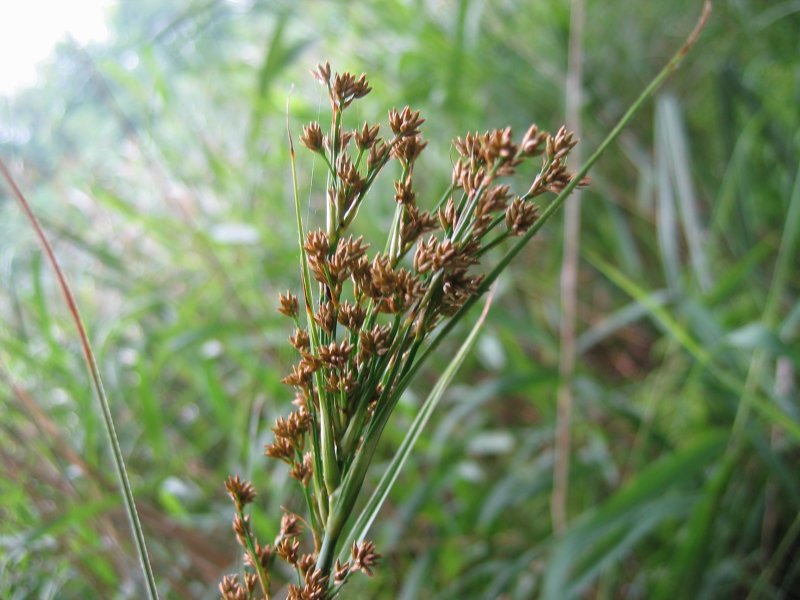

Scientific classification
- Kingdom: Plantae
- Clade: Tracheophytes
- Clade: Angiosperms
- Clade: Monocots
- Clade: Commelinids
- Order: Poales
- Family: Cyperaceae
- Genus: Cladium
- Species: C. mariscus

Binomial name
- Cladium mariscus (L.) Pohl

Synonyms
- Schoenus mariscus L.

= Cladium mariscus =

Species of grass-like plant

Cladium mariscus is a species of flowering plant in the sedge family known by the common names swamp sawgrass, great fen-sedge, saw-sedge or sawtooth sedge. Previously it was known as elk sedge. It is native of temperate Europe and Asia where it grows in base-rich boggy areas and lakesides. It can be up to 2.5 metres (8 ft 2 in) tall, and has leaves with hard serrated edges. In the past, it was an important material to build thatched roofs; harvesting it was an arduous task due to its sharp edges that can cause deep lacerations.

== Subspecies ==
- C. m. californicum (S.Watson) Govaerts - California, Arizona, New Mexico, Nevada, Utah, Texas, Sonora, Coahuila
- C. m. intermedium Kük. - Australia, New Caledonia
- C. m. jamaicense (Crantz) Kük. - Latin America from Mexico to Argentina; West Indies; southeastern United States from Texas to Delaware; naturalized in tropical Africa and on many oceanic islands including Canary Islands, Madagascar, New Guinea, Hawaii
- C. m. mariscus - Europe, northern Asia and North Africa from Ireland and Morocco to Japan, including Germany, Italy, France, Scandinavia, Poland, Balkans, Ukraine, Russia, Siberia, Saudi Arabia, Iran, Himalayas, Kazakhstan, China, Korea
