= Prehistoric Norfolk =

Archaeology of Norfolk, England

Location map of important pre-historic finds in Norfolk

The prehistory of the County of Norfolk, England is broken into specific time periods, these being Palaeolithic, Mesolithic and Neolithic .

Norfolk has a very rich prehistoric past, from the Palaeolithic era 950,000 years ago, to end of the Iron Age 2000 years ago. Indeed, Norfolk has the earliest evidence of human occupation of what is now Britain, and some of the country's best-preserved archaeological sites.

== Palaeolithic ==
The period from almost three-quarters of a million years ago until around 10,000 years ago.

During the Palaeolithic and Mesolithic periods the coast of Norfolk would have been 60–70 km further to the north than today, with much of the North Sea a wide, open plain. The size of the habitable land would have varied through the different glacial and interglacial periods up until the end of the Anglian Stage, as would have the climate, flora and fauna, and the general landscape of Norfolk. The Anglian glaciation was the 3rd from last glacial stage and occurred between 400,000 and 500,000 years ago. This stage was the last time the ice sheets reached East Anglia and it resulted in the deposits known as the Corton Formation.

The majority of the evidence for Lower and Middle Palaeolithic occupation in East Anglia survives as redeposited flakes and tools recovered from river gravel deposits. These river gravels were laid by the ancestral Thames and Bytham River systems. Large quantities of artefacts were identified from gravel quarries during the 19th and early 20th century due to the increased demand for gravel in the construction industry and the hand sorting of this gravel.

=== Lower Palaeolithic ===
- c. 950,000 BC. Homo antecessor evidence in Norfolk.

Bones and flint tools found in coastal deposits near Happisburgh. The artefacts were in situ in riverine deposits of the Cromer Forest Bed series. Experts previously thought the earliest humans arrived 700,000 years ago.

The flint assemblage consists of;

  - an ovate handaxe,
  - a thinning flake/handaxe thinning flake,
  - a flake,
  - a scraper,
  - 29 flakes & hammerstone(?) & fragments,
  - retouched flint flake,
  - and Lower(?) Palaeolithic ovate flint hand axe.

The importance of the flint assemblage of Happisburgh is not just to the understanding the prehistory of Norfolk, but to the understanding of prehistoric Europe. This is due to the first mentioned hand axe in the assemblage. The hand axe is an ovate handaxe made from black flint with pale grey coarse-grained inclusions, one face carries two small areas of pebble cortex, and is in near perfect condition. This handaxe is believed to be the earliest tool yet found in Europe; it was probably used as a knife for cutting up carcasses.

The environmental conditions of Happisburgh, shown through pollen analysis, suggests a picture of a temperate woodland with areas of fen carr and aquatic plants growing in a maritime environment of tidal sediments. With evidence showing a preponderance of pine and alder, with oak, elm and hornbeam also present; members of the galingale, buttercup and nettle families point to fen or reedswamp environments, while water-starwort, water lilies and bulrushes are among the aquatic plants present.

Other Lower Palaeolithic sites in Norfolk include:

- Whitlingham:
  - worked flint,
  - tool,
  - cleaver,
  - axe,
  - collection of Lower Palaeolithic flint implements, including three flint cleavers and five flint handaxes
- Keswick:
  - axe,
  - flint,
  - Acheulian type flint hand-axe,
  - Early Wolstonian Stage, side scraper found with flint at the gravel pit near Keswick Mill in 1957
- South Acre:
  - axe,
  - worked flint,
  - flint Levallois type hand-axe, missing its tip, found with a Neolithic flint industry at South Acre,
  - Lower Palaeolithic lithic core of Clactonian type and a
  - side scraper made on a flake, found at South Acre between 1935 and 1939
- Runton:
  - broken tip of a thin pointed Lower Palaeolithic handaxe

There is little evidence of human occupation during the subsequent Ipswichian Stage between around 180,000 and 70,000 years ago, lead.

=== Middle Palaeolithic ===
Roughly 60,000 years age to 30,000 years ago.

Well-preserved in-situ Middle Palaeolithic open-air sites are exceedingly rare in Europe and very unusual within a British context.

- Lynford Quarry, Mundford: 60,000 years ago Homo neanderthalensis (Neanderthals)

In-situ mammoth remains and associated Mousterian stone tools and debitage. The artefactual, faunal, and environmental evidence were sealed, in-situ, within a Middle Devensian palaeochannel with a dark organic fill. Forty-four pristine Mousterian flint handaxes, the remains of at least nine Mammuthus primigenius (woolly mammoths).

The assemblage.

Some 590 worked flint artefacts consisting of number of handaxes (pointed, subcordiform, cordiform, ovate and bout coupé forms), three cores and a number of retouched, utilised and waste flakes were individually recorded with over 1,000 pieces of microdebitage recovered from the 0.50 m2 spit units. A number of the handaxes and flakes were found in direct association with bones and/or tusks. The artefacts are generally fresh and relatively sharp with minimal abrasion or post-depositional edge damage. Typologically the assemblage falls within the Mousterian of Acheulean Tradition (MTA) facies of the Middle Palaeolithic.

The Fauna, flora and environmental evidence.

In total, some 2,079 bones, tusks, antlers, and teeth of Mammuthus primigenius (mammoth), Coelodonta antiquitatis (woolly rhinoceros), Rangifer tarandus (reindeer), Equus ferus (wild horse), Bison priscus (bison), Canis lupus (wolf), Vulpes vulpes or Alopex lagopus (red or Arctic fox), and Ursus arctos (brown bear) were individually recorded and a further 25,000 bone, tooth, and tusk fragments recovered. Feces of scavengers (possibly the spotted hyena Crocuta crocuta) were also recovered from the organic sediments. No articulated skeletons were found. The bone varied in condition with some bones extensively weathered and others exhibiting traces of gnawing by predator-scavengers. Bone fractures characteristic of marrow extraction by hominids have been identified on some of the reindeer and horse bones recovered from the deposit. The faunal remains recovered from the palaeochannel are typical of the Pin Hole Mammal Assemblage Zone of the Middle Devensian.

Through archaeo-environmental analysis, 150 species of insect have been identified. These indicate the presence of standing water, marsh, bare sand and grass. Dung and carcass beetles add to the picture of giant rotting mammals being scavenged by hyenas and Neanderthals. The presence of sub-Arctic plants, insects and snails at this site indicates that the Neanderthals of this time lived in a climate like that of modern Scandinavia.

Interpretation The mammoths appear to have been butchered but it is unclear whether these beasts were hunted, or their meat simply scavenged from corpses. The site is internationally important due to the rarity of such sites being preserved.

Other sites There is little evidence from this period. Other sites within modern Norfolk include:

- Little Cressingham see; Lawson, 1978: 'A Hand Axe from Little Cressingham', AJ Lawson (E Anglian Archaeology Report #8, 1978; p. 1)

=== Upper Palaeolithic ===
The Upper Palaeolithic period covers the end of the last glaciation Devensian Stage and the immediate post-glacial period Flandrian. At the beginning of this period Britain was a part of the European landmass and settlement in Norfolk was just an extension of the settlement of the North European Plain, while by the end of this period it had become more or less the island that we now know. At the end of the Devensian the sea-level was about 30 m below present with most of the land becoming forested with the ameliorating climate. In the mid-9th millennium BP, with the breaching of the land bridge, East Anglia became cut off from the rest of north-west Europe. Sea levels rose rapidly and peat formation commenced in low-lying areas.

Although material has been recovered from across the region dating to this period, there have been very few large scale excavations, particularly in recent years. The majority of material identified from East Anglia consists of stray artefacts with only a few known stratified sites. Norfolk also lacks the cave sites which have proved to be so important for the preservation of sites in other areas e.g. Kent's Cavern, Torbay, Devon; Creswell Crags, Derbyshire; Gough's Cave, Cheddar Gorge, Somerset. The Earlier Upper Palaeolithic is very poorly represented across the whole region although there is somewhat more known from the Later Upper Palaeolithic.

Early Upper Palaeolithic Flint leaf points reported at Heacham and Feltwell but it is not certain that they are not products of the later, Neolithic industries which also included leaf points.

List of sites

- Carrow Road football ground. Experts believe the tools could be from the Upper Palaeolithic era, could be 12,000 years old, from 10,000 BC.
- Titchwell, near Brancaster, is a beach site exposed only at very low tides which has yielded a large collection of Late Up Palaeo flints and is clearly a near-intact land surface, suffering slow erosion. (J J Wymer and P A Robins 1994)
- Hockwold cum Wilton evidence of long blade industries (Healy 1996, 53)
- Methwold evidence of long blade industries (Healy 1996, 53)

Healy F., 1996 The Fenland Project No. 11: The Wissey Embayment: evidence for pre-Iron Age occupation accumulated prior to the Fenland Project, E. Anglian Archaeol. 78, 53

J J Wymer and P A Robins 1994 A long blade flint industry beneath boreal peat at Titchwell, Norfolk Norfolk Archaeology, Vol XLII, part 1

In general this period is still poorly understood in Norfolk.

== Mesolithic ==
The beginning of the Holocene corresponds with the beginning of the Mesolithic age in most of Europe around 10,000 years ago. Temperatures rose, probably to levels similar to those today, and forests expanded further. By 8,500 years ago, the rising sea levels caused by the melting glaciers cut Britain off from continental Europe for the last time. The warmer climate changed the Arctic environment to one of pine, birch and alder forest; this less open landscape was less conducive to the large herds of reindeer and horse that had previously sustained humans. Those animals were replaced in people's diets by less social animals such as elk, red deer and aurochs which would have required different hunting techniques in order to be effectively exploited. Tools changed to incorporate barbs which could snag the flesh of a hunted animal, making it harder for it to escape alive. Tiny microliths were developed for hafting onto harpoons and spears. Woodworking tools such as adzes appear in the archaeological record, although some flint blade types remained similar to their Palaeolithic predecessors. The dog was domesticated because of its benefits during hunting (see Star Carr) and the wetland environments created by the warmer weather would have been a rich source of fish and game. It is likely that these environmental changes were accompanied by social changes with the groups that inhabited Britain at this time. Evidence from other parts of Britain suggests that during this period the people were becoming more settled rather than solely nomadic see Howich on the Northumbrian coast, Dunbar in East Lothian, although there is no evidence found in Norfolk to date.

Sites

- Titchwell has a rich site of the Late Glacial and Early Mesolithic period. The site lay beside a small stream but the then coastline was still far distant – the sea level 60 metres below its present level.
- Leman and Ower Banks, 40 km off Norfolk. A barbed antler point radiocarbon dated to about 9800BC, dredged off the sea bed in 1931.

Due to the coast being much further out than the present coast line and the barbed antler point found in the North Sea suggests there are many more Early Mesolithic sites under the North Sea off the Norfolk coast.

Other inland sites

- Kelling Heath. In terms of scattered flintwork over a large area, Kelling Heath is one of the richest sites of this time in Norfolk. With artefacts including cores, blades, flakes, in all 51 Mesolithic flint objects; 3 two-platform blade cores, 3 one-platform blade cores, 1 core, 15 blades and bladelets, 29 flakes and flake fragments. Due to the intensely acid soil of this part of the Cromer Ridge nothing but the flintwork has survived. Such a high (high for Norfolk) vantage point would have allowed the Mesolithic hunters magnificent views of the wide plains that are now the North Sea, which may have been the reason for the visits, probably seasonal from generation to generation.
- Great Melton. This parish on the River Yare has revealed through excavation and fieldwalking a number of Mesolithic sites, including one of the most important Mesolithic sites in Norfolk. A site near Pockthorpe has produced over 32000 mesolithic flint artefacts, including over 18000 flakes, over 12000 blades and over 280 microliths. The site was probably an open camp and flint working site. In the north of the parish close to the River Yare, a large number of Mesolithic and neolithic flint artefacts have been found which may suggest the flint was mined and flints worked on the site during the two periods. (Wymer, J.J. & Robins, P.A.. 1995.)
- Spong Hill. There are signs of forest clearance by burning from this site.

The Breckland district seems to have been attractive to hunter-gatherers during the Late Mesolithic (c. 6000–4000 BC). This may be due to its proximity to the fen-edge and salt marshes, which were rich in wildfowl, and eels. The lighter soils of Breckland, lighter than on the claylands to the north, would have resulted in the wildwoods being less dense thus enabling easier hunting of deer and other species. Two recent excavations in different parts of Thetford are:

- Redcastle Furze near Thetford, Mesolithic flintworking site
- Two Mile Bottom near Thetford, Mesolithic flintworking site

Microliths have frequently been found in the Brecks, including along the Little Ouse Valley, and around the edges of the meres (small lakes).

The heavier boulder clay of the Norfolk till plain has a site that has produced more flint tranchet axes than any other in East Anglia

- Banham

Wymer, J.J. & Robins, P.A.. 1995. A Mesolithic Site at Great Melton IN Norfolk Archaeology. Vol. XLII, pp 125–147. Vol. XLII, p. 125ff.

== Neolithic ==
The Neolithic period, 4000-2500BC, has produced a larger archaeological record than the previous prehistoric periods due to their impact and changing their surroundings that the Neolithic peoples had on the landscape, from industrial to maybe religious needs. By the time of the Neolithic Norfolk, like the rest of Britain, was cut off from mainland Europe by the North Sea and the English Channel.

Norfolk has revealed important information concerning this period in British history.

Neolithic communities seem to have preferred Norfolk's light soils and well-drained river valley tracts, rather than the heavily wooded central claylands, although these were probably occupied to some extent and also exploited for hunting and foraging. Excavation results indicate that the woodland was dominated by oak and pine, see Broome Heath and Colney. The fertile Rich Loam region of north and east Norfolk, with its loess-rich soils, may have been especially congenial, and the number of possible monuments here is striking.

Neolithic settlements

- Broome Heath The Broome Heath earthwork formed part of a monument complex which seems to have developed over some time, with a long barrow and round barrow constructed north-east of the northern terminal of the C-sharped enclosure, and a round barrow south-east of the southern terminal.
- Kilverstone, Thetford, 226 earlier Neolithic pits interprecated as temporary occupation site (Garrow et-al 2005).

Duncan Garrow, Emma Beadsmoore & Mark Knight. 2005. Pit Clusters and the Temporality of Occupation: an Earlier Neolithic Site at Kilverstone, Thetford, Norfolk. In VOLUME 71, Proceedings of the Prehistoric Society

Causewayed enclosures

All of the Norfolk Causewayed enclosure sites appear to be approximately circular, defined by relatively narrow ditches and pit sections, interspersed with narrow causeways. These enclosures are generally defined by single ditches, however the recently published plot of Roughton (Oswald et al., 2001: fig. 6.7), has identified a second, more ephemeral, inner ditch or feature. The three possible Norfolk examples are relatively small and have a marked circularity in comparison to many other causewayed enclosure sites in England

- Buxton with Lammas
- Roughton see
- Salthouse in north-east Norfolk. The monument is approximately circular, with a diameter of 60 metres. The circuit appears to be divided into at least seven separate lengths of ditch, although there is a larger gap to the north where a further two stretches of ditch may be obscured. The enclosure lies at a height of 50 metres OD on a south facing slope. The location overlooks the areas to the East, South and West but is topographically situated slightly downslope from the higher ground to the immediate north.

The way in which they were used is not fully understood, but they may have been a meeting point for small, dispersed groups of people living in the surrounding area, a place where the exchange of goods, ritual feasting and other ceremonial activities might have taken place.

All three enclosures, the only sites of this type known from the county, are notable for their small size and circular shape. In national terms their morphology is rather anomalous, a characteristic which can be interpreted in a number of ways. It has been suggested that they may have more in common with hengiform monuments of the later Neolithic and early Bronze Age than with 'normal' causewayed enclosures of the fourth millennium BC. Alternatively, they might represent a regional tradition distinct to this part of the country. In addition, the geographical distribution of the sites is confined to north-east Norfolk. While some allowance can be made for the usual factors associated with the distribution of cropmark sites (soils, geology, etc.), at present it seems that the clustering of the three sites in the north-east of the county may be of archaeological significance. The smaller dimensions of the Norfolk sites may be a reflection of the size and dispersal of the communities creating, maintaining and using them and it may not be necessary to assume that they occurred later than elsewhere in Britain. Although at present no excavation has taken place on any of the Norfolk 'causewayed' enclosures so these questions have yet to be answered.

=== References ===
- Oswald, A., Dyer, C, and Barber, M. 2001. The Creation of Monuments: Neolithic Causewayed Enclosures in the British Isles. Swindon: English Heritage

Henge sites

- Arminghall Henge A small henge at Arminghall in Norfolk which also enclosed a ring of posts has a diameter of only 30 metres. It lies near the junction of the rivers Yare and Tas, less than 4 km south of the centre of Norwich. Two circular ring ditches, the outer one 1.5 m deep and the inner one 2.3 m deep, with indications of a bank that once stood between them. In the centre stood eight massive posts, almost 1 m in diameter. The site dates to the Neolithic, with a radiocarbon date of 3650–2650 Cal BC (4440±150) from charcoal from a post-pit. The henge is orientated on the mid-winter sunset.
- Markshall Another possible example, which has never seen excavation, has been recorded on the opposite side of the River Tas by aerial photography at Markshall (Wade-Martin 1999, plate 22).
- Costessey An undated circular enclosure is located in pasture, close to the confluence of the Rivers Tud and Wensum. It comprises a circular bank, with an internal diameter of about 30 m, and a circular ditch outside it. It has been suggested that it may be comparable to the Neolithic henge at Arminghall. (Robertson, D. 2005.)

=== References ===
- Beex, W., Peterson, J 2004. 'The Arminghall henge in space and time: how virtual reality contributes to research on its orientation'. In [Enter the Past] The E-way into the four dimensions of Cultural Heritage, CAA2003, BAR International Series 1227, pp. 490–493, Oxford.
- Clark, J.D.G., 1936 'The Timber Monument at Arminghall and its Affinities', Proceedings of the Prehistoric Society, 2, 1–51
- Robertson, D. (NLA), 2005.
- Wade-Martin, P. (ed), 1999 Norfolk from the Air II

Long Barrows

In Norfolk there is only rare evidence of the remains of Long Borrows, most of the remains having been ploughed flat over the years.

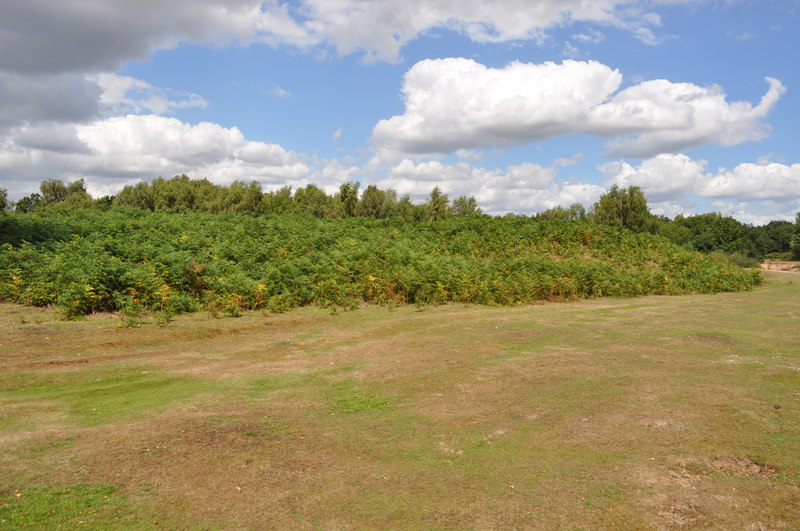
The Long Barrow at Broome Heath

- Broome Heath, Ditchingham A Neolithic burial mound or long barrow, about 50m long and 25m wide. Human remains were found in the 19th century, but these were probably a later insertion. Neolithic flints and pottery fragments have been found over the years, often being excavated by rabbits.

The barrow, as well as being used for burial, may also have had ceremonial uses.

- Harpley Common This Neolithic long barrow is visible as an oval mound 1.2m high and 31m long by 23m wide. This is part of a larger mound that has been destroyed by ploughing and the construction of the Harpley to Weasenham St Peter road. The mound is surrounded by a ditch about 4.5m wide. The ditch is now infilled.
- Felthorpe This is a possible Neolithic long barrow, which survives as an earthwork mound.
- Roughton Seen as a crop mark
- Marlingford Seen as a crop mark
- Tuttington Seen as a crop mark

Neolithic Industry

- Grimes Graves
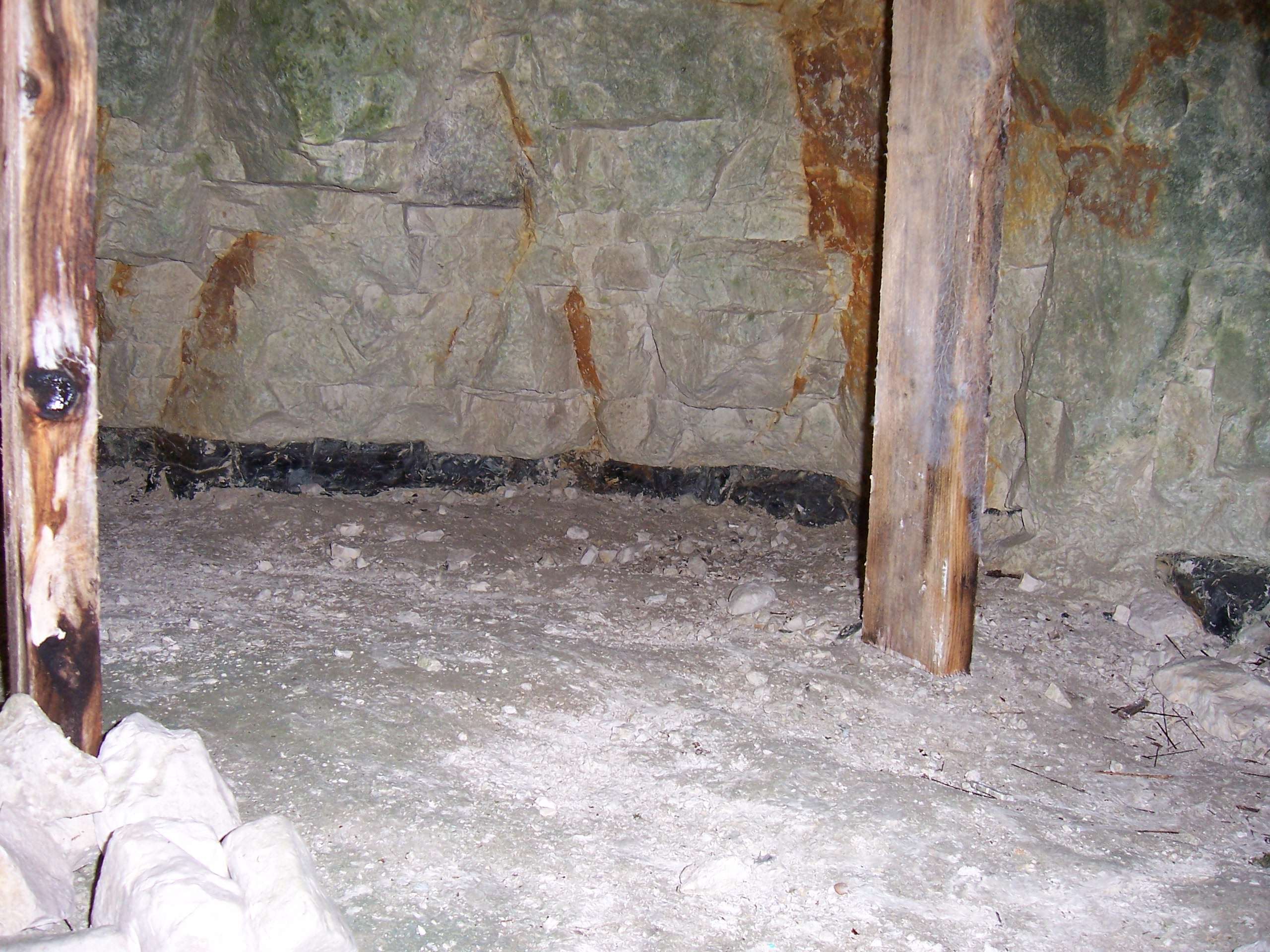
  View of a seam of Flint in the Grimes Graves excavation. The pit props are modern supports added when the site was excavated
  is a large Neolithic flint mining complex near Brandon close to the border between Norfolk and Suffolk .A recent survey by English Heritage found that Grimes Graves was one of only ten Neolithic flint mines known in England, of which only six survive as earthworks. Dating from roughly 3000–2000 BC, mining began at the site during the later Neolithic and continued for a while into the Bronze Age. The Anglo-Saxons believed the site was the work of the god Grim – (possibly a euphemism for Woden,) -the place-name means 'Grim's quarries'. The available radiocarbon dates suggest that mining may have taken place over a period of between 500 and 1,000 years. It extends over an area of around 37 ha (0.37 km^{2} / 96 acres) and consists of at least 433 shafts dug into the natural chalk to reach seams of flint. The deepest shafts are more than 12 m (40 feet) deep and the widest is around 18 m (60 ft,) in diameter at the surface. It has been calculated that more than 2,000 tonnes of chalk had to be removed from the larger shafts, taking 20 people around five or six months, before stone of sufficient quality was reached. An upper, (topstone,) and middle (wallstone,) seam of flint was dug through on the way to the deeper third seam (floorstone,) which most interested the miners. The mines were sunk at a rate of one every one or two years. Although recent research has suggested that small groups of mines may have been dug simultaneously. Mining was however neither intensive, nor on an 'industrial' scale, as we understand the term today. The geology at Grimes Graves comprises a number of flint layers lying below sands and clays and interspersed between chalk. It was the upper three seams of flint which were exploited, and the lowest of the three, known as 'floorstone', was generally targeted because it was in larger tabular nodules, it was easily flaked, less flawed than flint from the other layers, and had a lustrous deep black colour. To get to the flint the Neolithic miners dug shafts up to 12 m deep with radiating galleries at their base, as well as shallower pits from 3 m to 8 m deep. Some mines are grouped together with two or three in a single quarry, implying that some were dug in sequence.
- Whitlingham Evidence has been found in the area of a Neolithic flint axe factory, including unfinished axes and waste flakes. In the 18th century a human skeleton, together with the picks made from deer's antlers, were found in one of the chalk tunnels – possibly the body of one of the Neolithic flint miners.

== Bibliography ==
- Ashwin, T. 1996. Neolithic and Bronze Age Norfolk. Proceedings of the Prehistoric Society 62, 41–62
- Piggott, S., (1986) 'Early British craftsmen' Antiquity LX No 230, pp. 189–192.
- Clutton-Brock, J., (1984) Excavations at Grimes Graves Norfolk 1972–1976 Fascicule 1: Neolithic Antler Picks From Grimes Graves, Norfolk, And Durrington Walls, Wiltshire: A Biometrical Analysis, British Museum Press, ISBN 0-7141-1374-3
- Longworth, I., Herne, A., Varndell, G. and Needham, S., (1991) Excavations at Grimes Graves Norfolk 1972–1976 Fascicule 3: Shaft X: Bronze Age Flint, Chalk and Metalworking, British Museum Press, ISBN 0-7141-1396-4
- Wainwright, G.J. 1972. The excavation of a Neolithic settlement on Broome Heath, Ditchingham, Norfolk, England. Proceedings of the Prehistoric Society 38, 1–97.
- Healy, F. (1984) 'Farming and field monuments: the Neolithic in Norfolk', in Barringer, C. (ed.) Aspects of East Anglian Prehistory (Twenty Years after Rainbird Clarke). Norwich: Geo Books: 77–140.
- Wymer, J.J. & Robins, P.A.. 1995. A Mesolithic Site at Great Melton IN Norfolk Archaeology. Vol. XLII, pp 125–147. Vol. XLII, p. 125ff.
- Clarke, J. G. D. & Fell, C. I., (1953) 'The Early Iron Age Site at Micklemoor Hill West Harling, Norfolk, and its Pottery' Proceedings of the Prehistoric Society 19 part 1 pp 1–40
- Clarke, J. D. G., (1936) 'The Timber Monument at Arminghall, and its Affinities' Proceedings of the Prehistoric Society 2 part 1 pp 1–51
- Healy, F. M., (1988) The Anglo-Saxon Cemetery at Spong Hill, North Elmham, Part VI: Occupation during the Seventh to Second Millennia BC, East Anglian Archaeology 39, Norfolk Museums Service
- Lawson, A. J., (1983) The Archaeology of Witton, East Anglian Archaeology 18, Norfolk Museums Service
- Sainty, J. E., (1924) 'A flaking site on Kelling Heath, Norfolk' PSEA 4 pp 165–176
- Sainty, J. E., (1925) 'The Kelling flaking site' PSEA 5 pp 283–287
- Sainty, J. E., (1947) 'Mesolithic sites in Norfolk' in Norfolk Archaeology 28 pp 234–237
- Wade-Martins, P., Ed., (1993) An Historical Atlas of Norfolk, Norfolk Museums and Archaeology Service
- Wainwright, G. J., (1972) 'The Excavation of a Neolithic Settlement on Broome Heath, Ditchingham, Norfolk' PPS 38 pp 1–97
- Wainwright, G. J., (1973) 'The Excavation of Prehistoric and Romano-British Settlements at Eaton Heath, Norwich' Arch J 130 pp 1–43
- Williamson, T., (1993) The Origins of Norfolk, Manchester University Press
- Wymer, J., (1991) Mesolithic Britain, Shire Archaeology
