= Corton =

Corton may refer to:

== Places ==
- Corton Formation, a geologic formation in Suffolk and Norfolk, England
- Corton, Suffolk, England, a village
- Corton, Wiltshire, England, a village
- Corton, West Virginia, an unincorporated community

== Cuisine ==
- Corton (wine), a French wine
- Corton (meat spread), a Québécois meat spread
- Corton (restaurant), a New York City restaurant

== See also ==
- Corton Denham
