= Broome Heath Pit =

UK Site of Special Scientific Interest

Coordinates: 52.473°N 1.454°E

- Site of Special Scientific Interest
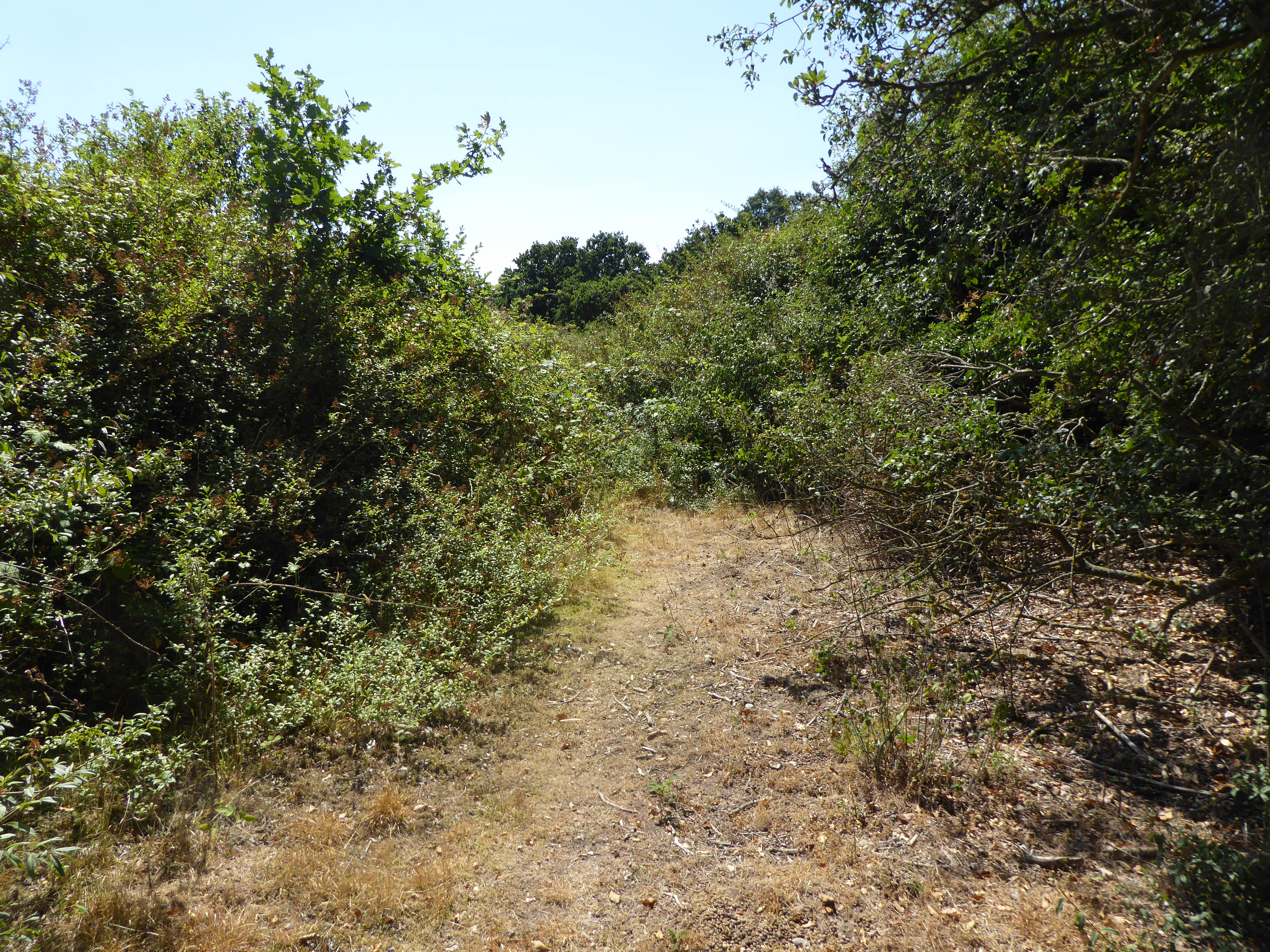
- Location of Broome Heath Pit.
- Area of search: Norfolk, England
- Grid reference: TM 347 917
- Interest: Geological
- Area: 1.2 hectares (3.0 acres)
- Notification date: 1995
- Location map: Magic Map

Broome Heath Pit is a 1.2-hectare (3.0-acre) geological Site of Special Scientific Interest east of Ditchingham in Norfolk, England. It is a Geological Conservation Review site and part of Broome Heath Local Nature Reserve

This site exposes rocks dating to the Wolstonian glaciation between around 350,000 and 130,000 years ago. It provides the only surviving exposure of the Broome Terrace, the flood plain of an ancient river. Ice wedges and fossils of Arctic flora and fauna indicate a tundra environment.

The site is open to the public but much of it is covered with dense scrub.
