= Community of All Hallows =

Religious order based in Suffolk, England

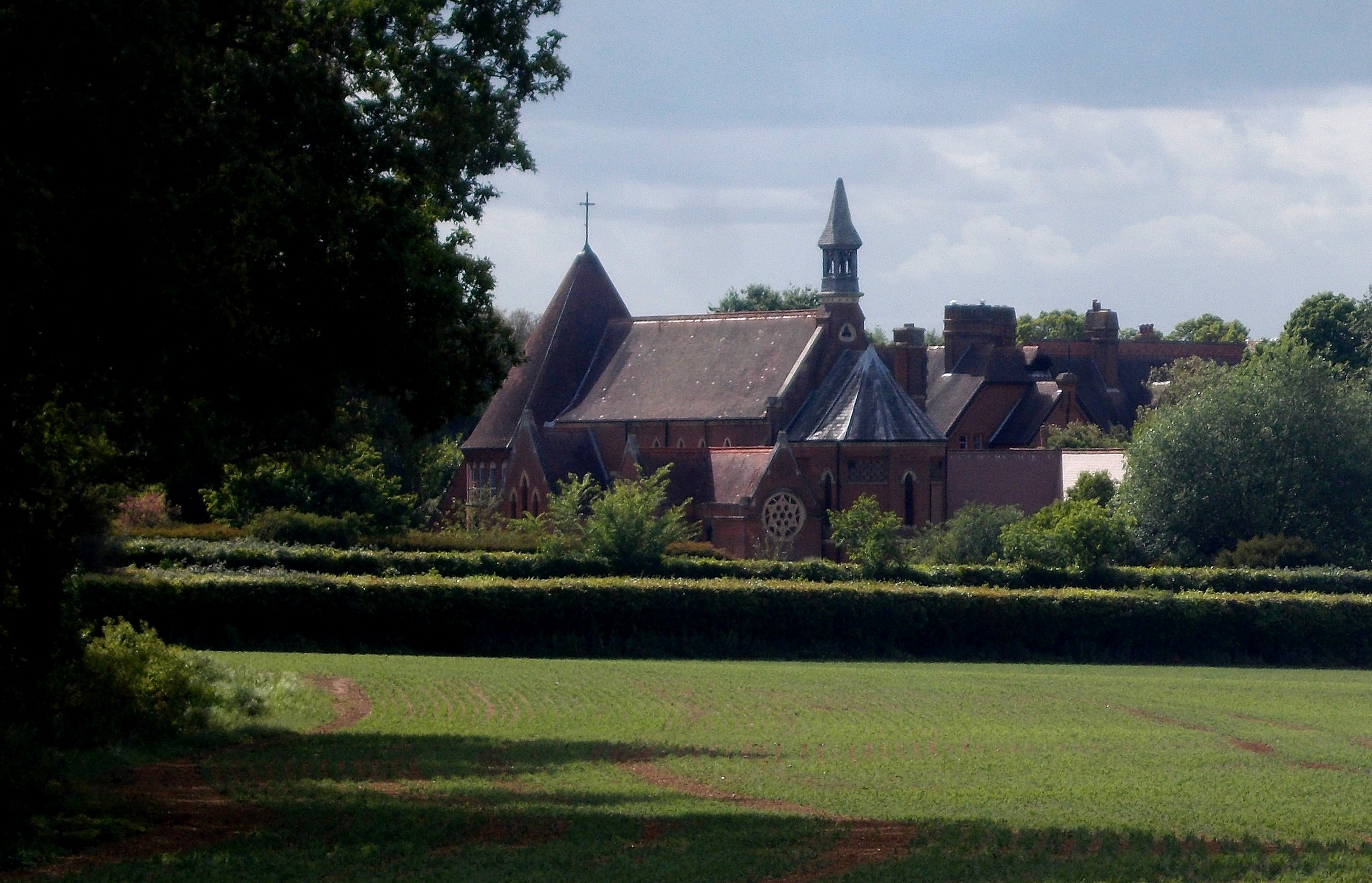
Conventual buildings of the Community of All Hallows at Ditchingham

The Community of All Hallows is an Anglican religious order based in Ditchingham, near Bungay, Suffolk, under the jurisdiction of the Church of England. The religious sisters lead a life of prayer and service providing hospitality and spiritual direction in two retreat house, one in the grounds of their former convent at Ditchingham and another on the Isle of Mull.

== History ==
The Community was founded in 1855 by Lavinia Crosse, daughter of surgeon John Green Crosse with William E. Scudamore an early chaplain.

It announced an intention to close in 2018, subsequently just moving out of the main convent building and satellite retreat house in Norwich.
