= Tindall Wood, Ditchingham =

Biological site in Norfolk, England

Coordinates: 52.489°N 1.426°E

- Site of Special Scientific Interest
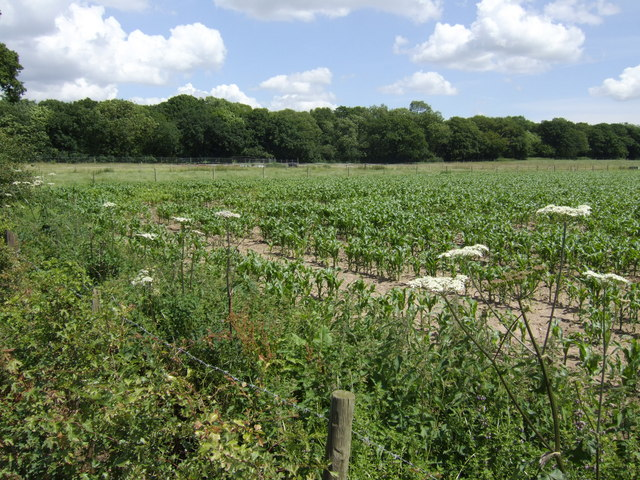
- Location of Tindall Wood, Ditchingham.
- Area of search: Norfolk
- Grid reference: TM 327 934
- Interest: Biological
- Area: 42.2 hectares (104 acres)
- Notification date: 1988
- Location map: Magic Map

Tindall Wood, Ditchingham is a 42.2-hectare (104-acre) biological Site of Special Scientific Interest north of Ditchingham in Norfolk, England.

It is one of the largest hornbeam woods in Norfolk. It is an ancient coppice with standards, and the standards are oak, ash, and hornbeam, and there are several uncommon species in the ground flora.

The wood is private with no public access.
