= Obadiah Short =

British painter (1803–1886)

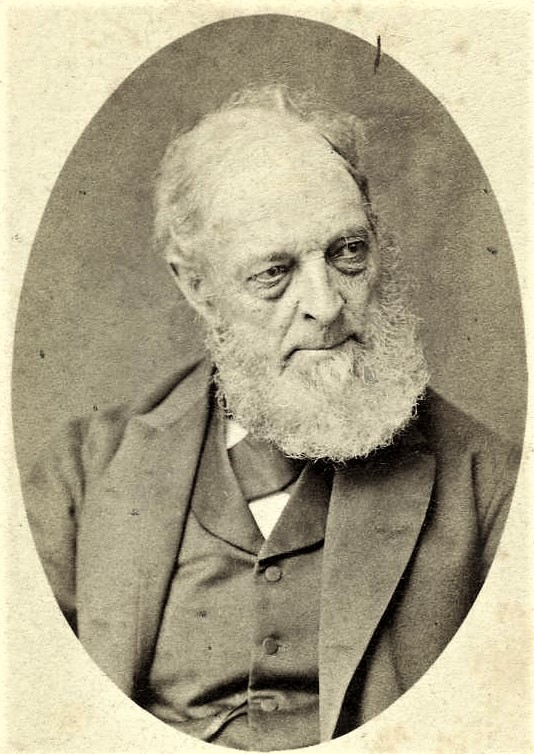
- Undated photograph by J. L. Brewery (Norfolk Museums Collections)
- Born: 26 July 1803; Norwich
- Died: 15 July 1886 (aged 82); Norwich
- Education: No formal education or training
- Known for: Landscape painting, fabric pattern design
- Movement: Norwich School of painters
- Spouse: Susan(nah) Kyburt

Obadiah Short (26 July 1803 – 15 July 1886) was an amateur British painter of landscapes. He is associated with the Norwich School of painters, which was the first provincial art movement in Britain. He wrote a detailed account of his childhood memories and produced accurate paintings of Norwich scenes, both of which have provided historians with a record of the city he lived in all his life.

Born of poor parents, he was orphaned during the Peninsular War when his mother, who was a camp follower with the British Army, fell sick and died in Lisbon, and his father was killed at the Battle of Corunna a few weeks later. The young Obadiah was subsequently brought up by his grandparents, and worked as a Norwich textile labourer before learning the trade of a weaver. He went on to become a pattern designer for Edward Willett, Nephew & Co., which manufactured shawls, and worked for the firm for 50 years.

After 1829 he began to draw, strongly influenced by the work of James Stark. In 1832 he walked from Norwich to the residence of the Earl of Leicester, and was permitted to study paintings in the Earl's collection. The following year he was commissioned to illustrate the Norwich surgeon John Green Crosse's prize-winning essay on urinary calculi. His paintings usually feature wooded landscapes around Norwich, or rural river scenes.

== Background ==
Obadiah Short was associated with the Norwich School of painters, a group of artists connected both by geographical location and their depictions of Norfolk landscapes, as well as by personal and professional relationships. The school's most important artists were John Crome, Joseph Stannard, George Vincent, Robert Ladbrooke, James Stark, John Thirtle and John Sell Cotman, along with Cotman's sons Miles Edmund and John Joseph Cotman. The school was a unique phenomenon in the history of 19th-century British art, and Norwich was the first English city outside London where a school of artists arose, and which had the right conditions to create a provincial art movement. It had more local-born artists than any subsequently-formed schools elsewhere. The city's theatrical, artistic, philosophical and musical cultures were cross-fertilised in a way that was unique outside London. The leading spirits and finest artists of the Norwich School were Crome and Cotman.

The Norwich Society of Artists was founded in 1803. It arose from the need for a group of Norwich artists to teach each other and their pupils. Not all of the members of the Norwich School were members of the Norwich Society, which held regular exhibitions and had an organised structure, showing works annually until 1825 and again from 1828 until it was dissolved in 1833. Unlike most of the Norfolk-based members of the Norwich School of painters, Obadiah Short never belonged to the Norwich Society of Artists.

At the end of the seventeenth century, other schools of painting had begun to form that associated with artists such as Francis Towne at Exeter and John Malchair at Oxford, and other centres of population outside London were creating art societies, whose artists and drawing masters influenced their pupils. Unlike the artists of the Norwich School, many other provincial artists did not benefit from wealthy merchants and landed gentry demonstrating their patriotism at a time of international unrest by acquiring picturesque paintings of the English countryside. The Norwich Society of Artists (1803–1833), the first group of its kind to be created since the formation of the Royal Academy in 1768, was remarkable in acting in its artists' interests for thirty years, longer than for any other similar group.

== Early life ==
Obadiah Short (Note: Short's first name is incorrectly transcribed as Obediah in numerous parish records.) was born on 26 July 1803 in a house close to Bethel Yard, Norwich, the son of Joseph Short and Elizabeth Cubitt. (Note: Joseph Short's parents were John and Mary Short of Laxfield in Suffolk.) Born six months after his parents married, he was baptised a day later at St Augustine's Church, Norwich. His father worked converting raw grain into malt on Mousehold Heath and was the sexton for the Norwich parishes of St. Augustine's and St. Saviour's. His mother was a Norwich cotton weaver. Two of Obadiah's younger brothers died in infancy and another, William, was baptised in 1807. His father enlisted in the British Army during Napoleon's campaign of 1808–1809 and travelled across the Iberian Peninsula, with his mother accompanying him as a camp follower. They died within weeks of each other: it is thought his mother succumbed to the conditions and his father was later killed in battle.

As a son of a British soldier killed during the Napoleonic Wars, Obadiah could have attended the Royal Military Asylum at Chelsea, but he was instead brought up by his grandparents in Norwich. His family's poverty forced him to seek poor relief and to be taken by his grandmother to Duke's Palace Plain, where employers came to hire boys as cheap labour.

It was the practise of Mr Thurlow to make all the Boys and Apprentices to leave work when there happened to be any executions – so we all went and he said it might be a warning to us, so that for the best 45 years of my life I have seen all the executions in Norwich though I cannot say that ever it done me any good.

— Obadiah Short, Recollections

Later in life, Short recalled his childhood, writing down his memories in a small leather-bound book, now in the Norfolk Museums Collections at Norwich Castle. In the book, which he called Recollections, he also recorded information about his family. It describes events such as the arrival in Norwich of news from London by mail coach; public celebrations after the announcement of the end of the Napoleonic Wars; the procession of the 'Gregorians' on the River Wensum; bull-baiting; the annual fair held north of the city; the public executions at the Castle; Norwich Guild Day and the procession of Snap the Dragon; prisoners transported by wagon to Thetford; pitched battles on Mousehold Heath; and lamplighting. Short's Recollections have provided modern historians with a link to the past and allowed the revival of previously forgotten traditions, such as wassailing.

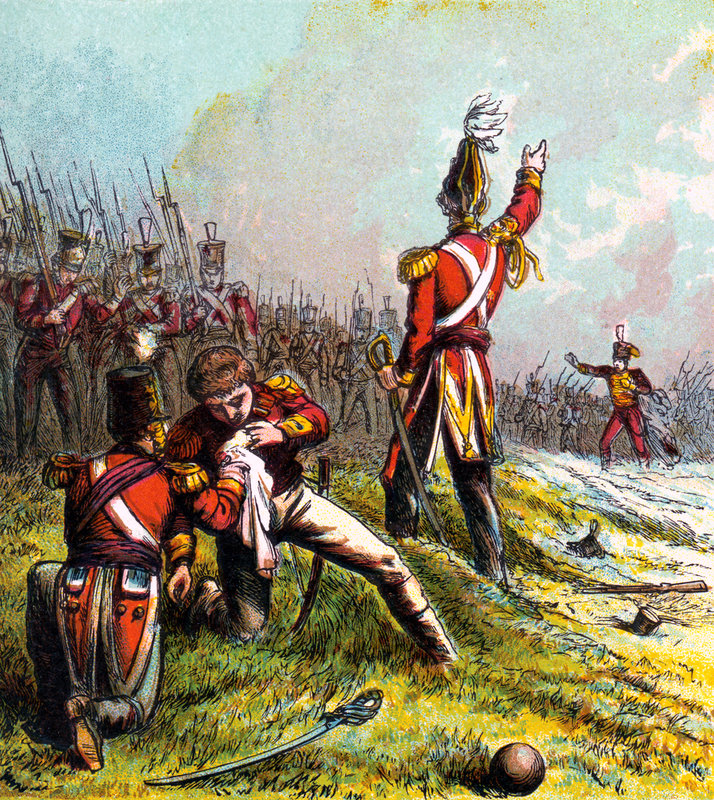
The Battle of Corunna (1809)

According to his Recollections, Obadiah, who was known to his family as Oba, supplemented his parents' income by working as a small boy in the textiles industry. He was paid to turn a cord wheel, for a master who treated him with relative kindness. He later worked for another master, running errands and polishing boots. His book recollects his memories of his parents and of what he was told about their fate.

Short wrote in Recollections that in 1808 straitened circumstances forced his father to become a substitute soldier in the East Norfolk Militia. Such militia units, which did not have to serve overseas, were used to supply trained soldiers in time of need. It was acceptable practice for a soldier in the militia to pay a substitute such as Joseph Short to serve on his behalf. Having later enlisted in the army, Joseph Short was promoted to the rank of corporal. He travelled that year to Spain as a regimental sergeant in Sir John Moore's army, along with Elizabeth, who came with her husband as a camp follower. (Note: The King's Own landed in Portugal on the 25th of August 1808. After reaching Lisbon and liberating the Portuguese, an army under the command of Sir John Moore marched to aid the Spanish, but Napoleon directed 80,000 men and 200 cannon against them. The British were forced to mount a daunting retreat of 250 miles over the mountains to the coast, travelling over hostile terrain in the depths of winter. Arriving at Corunna, the army of 14,500 men sheltered and rested, awaiting transport for England. On the 16th of January 1809, it was attacked by 20,000 French troops. After fierce fighting, British forced the French to retreat, but near the end of the battle, Sir John Moore was killed. That night the British began embarking for England.) After falling ill during the retreat of the army across Spain, she was sent with the sick and wounded to a military hospital in Lisbon, where she died. As Joseph Short failed to return to England and was never heard from again, it was assumed by his family that he was killed on 16 January 1809, in the midst of the Battle of Corunna. (Note: Passages from Obadiah Short's Recollections describe the family's futile attempts to find out what happened to Joseph Short in Spain, and track down the letters he sent home: I could never hear for certain what became of my Father, as the lost letters which he sent us immediately after those weeks retreat even the War Office could not ascertain, yet as he was a Sargent I should have thought this account would be sent, but I could never make anything out about them but when many Soldiers came home from the war one told one tale & another to another for in those days the people (Related to those who had died in the war) treated those who returned with Beer and all kinds of drink and sure enough as long as the Beer was forthcoming so long the news lasted either true or false. … …my Father Volunteered in the 40th Regiment of Foot and went with the Regiment to Spain and was with the army under Sir John Moor In the Retreat to Corrunna My Father sent a letter (the last he wrote) saying that the Army was in Retreat over hills & Mountains for the Week, which was the Retreat of Sir John Moore and where Sir John Moore was killed, and buried on the Ramparts of the City. My Mother was carried with the sick and wounded to Lisbon Hospital and after a short time she Died. My father sent no more Letters after the one in which he said that My Mother was dead I never heard what became of my Father – though my grandfather wrote to the War Office more than once but could never hear anything of him.)

== Working life ==
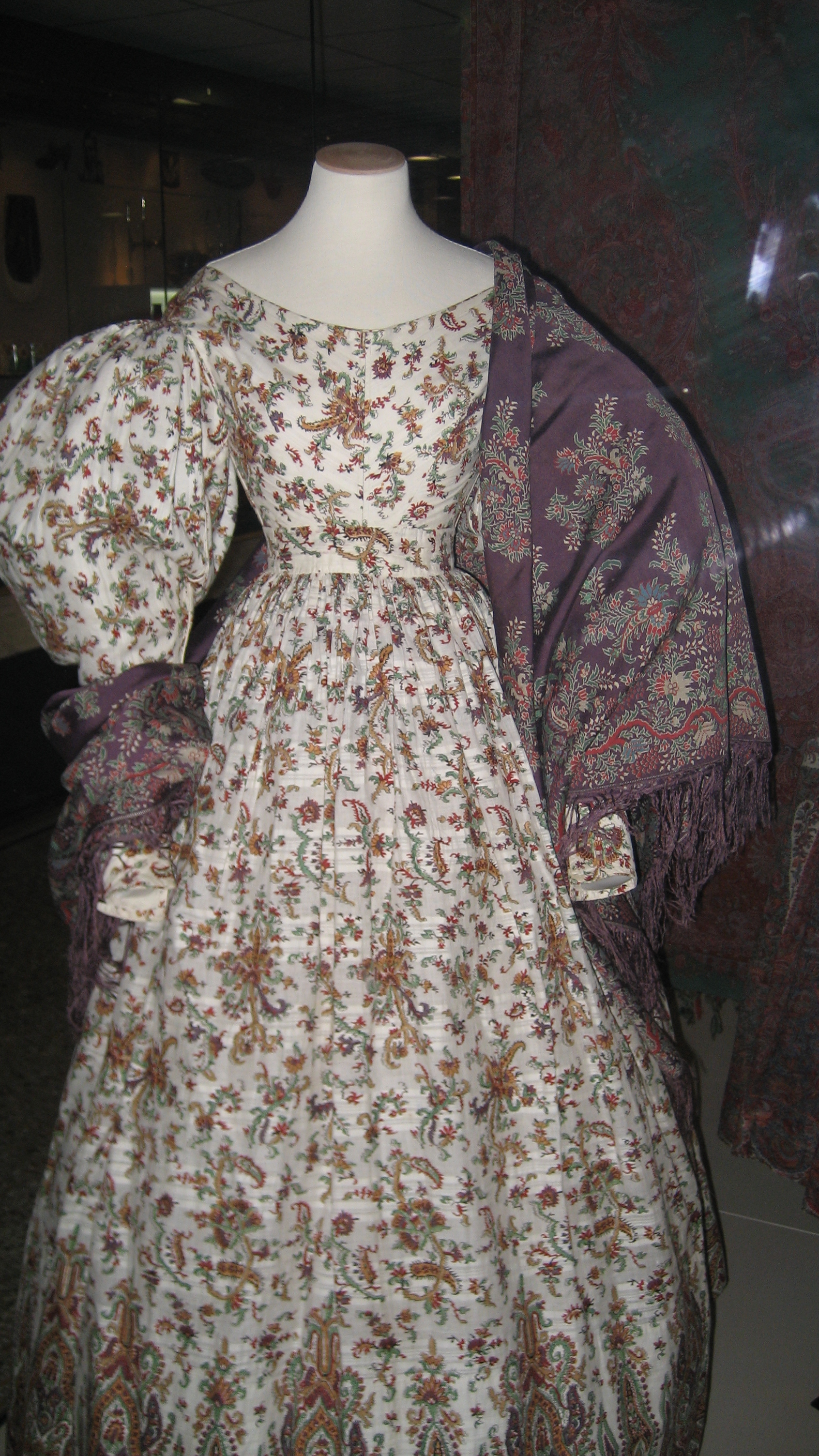
An example of a shawl made by Edward Willett, Nephew & Co.

Before the 1840s, many of Short's family were employed in Norwich's textile industry. Spinning and weaving were done in the workers' homes, but the fast-changing fashions, and competition with the mills of the north of England made such a practice obsolete. Norwich's textile mills owners had to buy fibres from manufacturers in the north, where they were made more cheaply. The Jacquard loom allowed manufacturers to invent their cloth designs, but were an expensive investment. Textiles mills around Norwch, such as St James Mill, failed to compete with mills located near raw resources such as coal.

Short worked as a weaver from the age of about thirteen, and learnt to weave bombazine. In 1834 he found work as a pattern designer at Edward Willett, Nephew & Co, a large manufacturer of silk shawls initially based in Pottergate, Norwich. (Note: Edward Willett, Nephew & Co. were "manufacturers of fancy dress fabrics" based Fisher's Lane, Pottergate. Few of the firm's records have survived. Jacquard looms, introduced in about 1828, were so unpopular with the workers that they attempted to halt the funeral cortege of Henry Willett in 1845. Willett & Nephew occupied a floor of the nearby St James Factory in 1869, whilst continuing to use their Pottergate premises to store materials for weavers working from their homes. The firm continued to trade until 1904.) As a designer, he had an important role, albeit as part of a large team of workers. Pattern designers were seldom named in company records and so nothing is known about many of them. Not all were locally based employees, or noted artists, as was the case with Short, who remained with the same firm for 50 years.

No records have survived of Short's designs, but an example of a fabric known to come from one is now in the Norfolk Museums Collections. Measuring 41 by 41 centimetres (16 in × 16 in), it is a silk Jacquard square made from eight pieces of shawl fabric, sewn together to make what may have been a cushion cover. Each quarter of the square shows a long pine and lily shape.

In the 1841 census Short was described as an 'artist', but later census returns give his profession as a 'designer', a 'designer of textile fabrics', and a 'designer artisan’.

== Family life ==
Short married Susanna (or Susan) Kyburt at St Saviour's Church in 1821. (Note: Obadiah Short was married at 18; Susanna Kyburt was younger than him.) Their children were Elizabeth (born in 1824), Harriet (born in 1826), Ann (born in March 1830, but died in February 1831), Obadiah (born in July 1833, died in infancy aged 10 months), Obadiah (born about 1835), Rachel (born in 1838), Charlotte (born in 1841), and Emma (born in 1844).

Short's second son Obadiah followed him in the textile trade and became a designer's assistant. The record of his marriage in 1856 to Elizabeth Wurr stated his occupation (and his father's) as 'designer'. He died in 1863, aged only 28. Susan Short died in 1871, having been married for fifty years.

== Artistic career ==
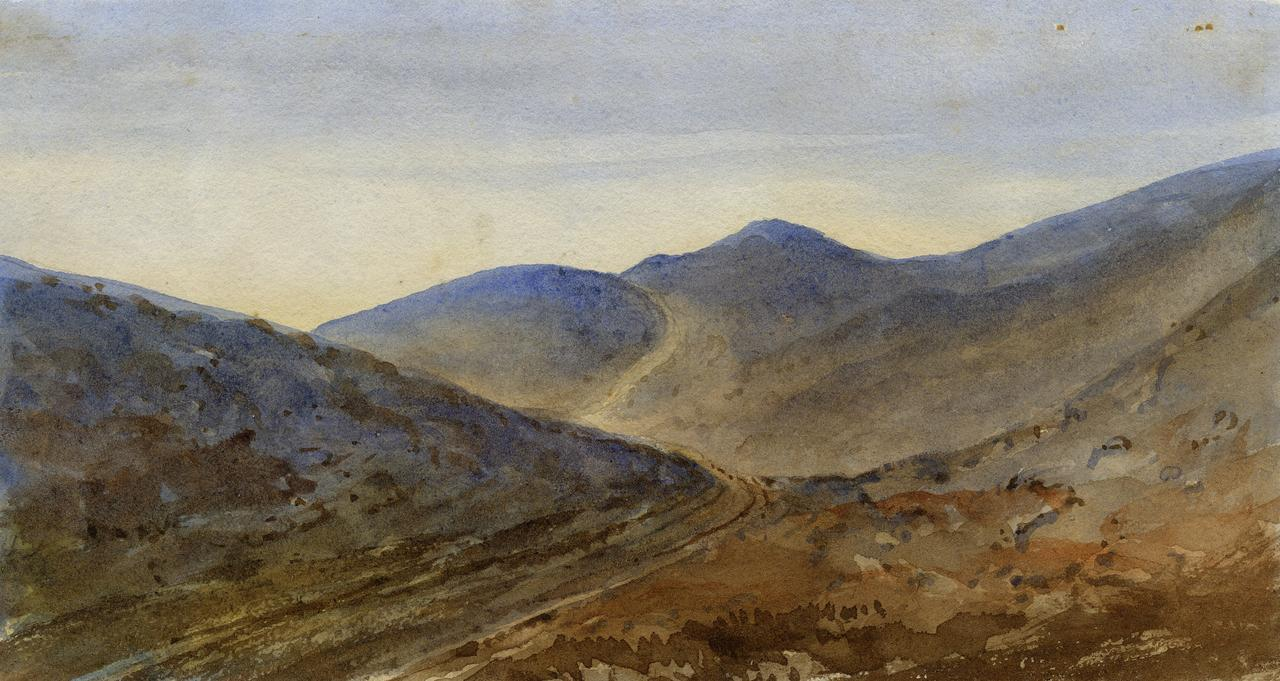
Sketch of Mousehold Heath (undated), Norfolk Museums Collections

Some time after 1829 Short saw an artist named Harbord copying a work by Crome, an encounter that may be why he began to sketch and paint. He was acquainted with the artist Edmund Sparshall, a local patron of the arts, who lent him pictures by Stark to copy. Short was influenced strongly by the works of both these artists.

In 1832, Crome's physician the Norwich surgeon William Dalrymple took an interest in Short and provided him with a letter of introduction to give to the Earl of Leicester. Short then walked over 30 miles (48 km) from Norwich to the Earl's stately home, Holkham Hall. There he was treated with kindness and was permitted to stay for several days where he studied the Earl's artworks, before walking home again. That year Short was commissioned by Dalrymple to draw birds for Norwich's Castle Museum, and draw pathological subjects for the students of the Norfolk and Norwich Hospital, which were kept in Dalrymple's museum of pathological specimens.

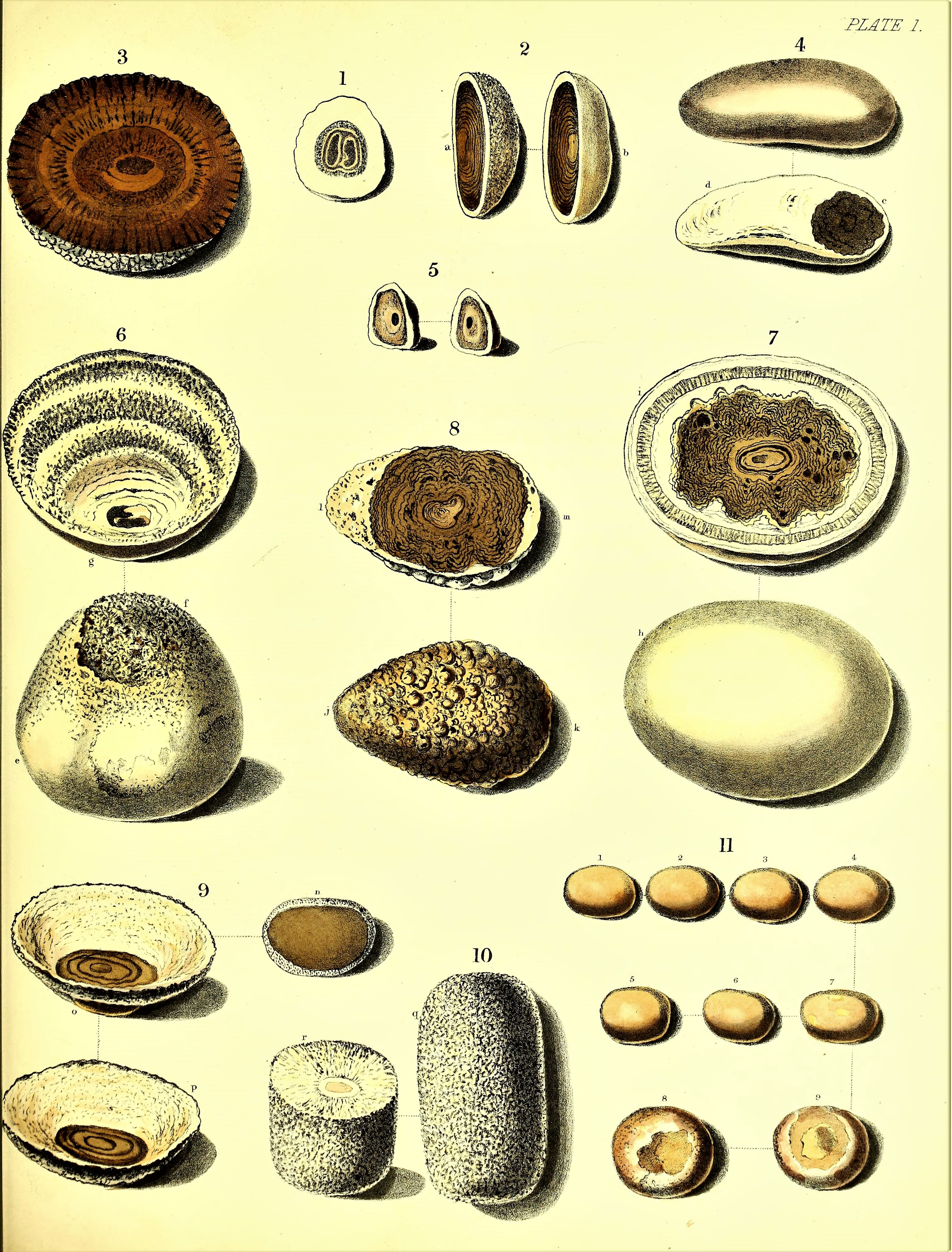
Plate 1

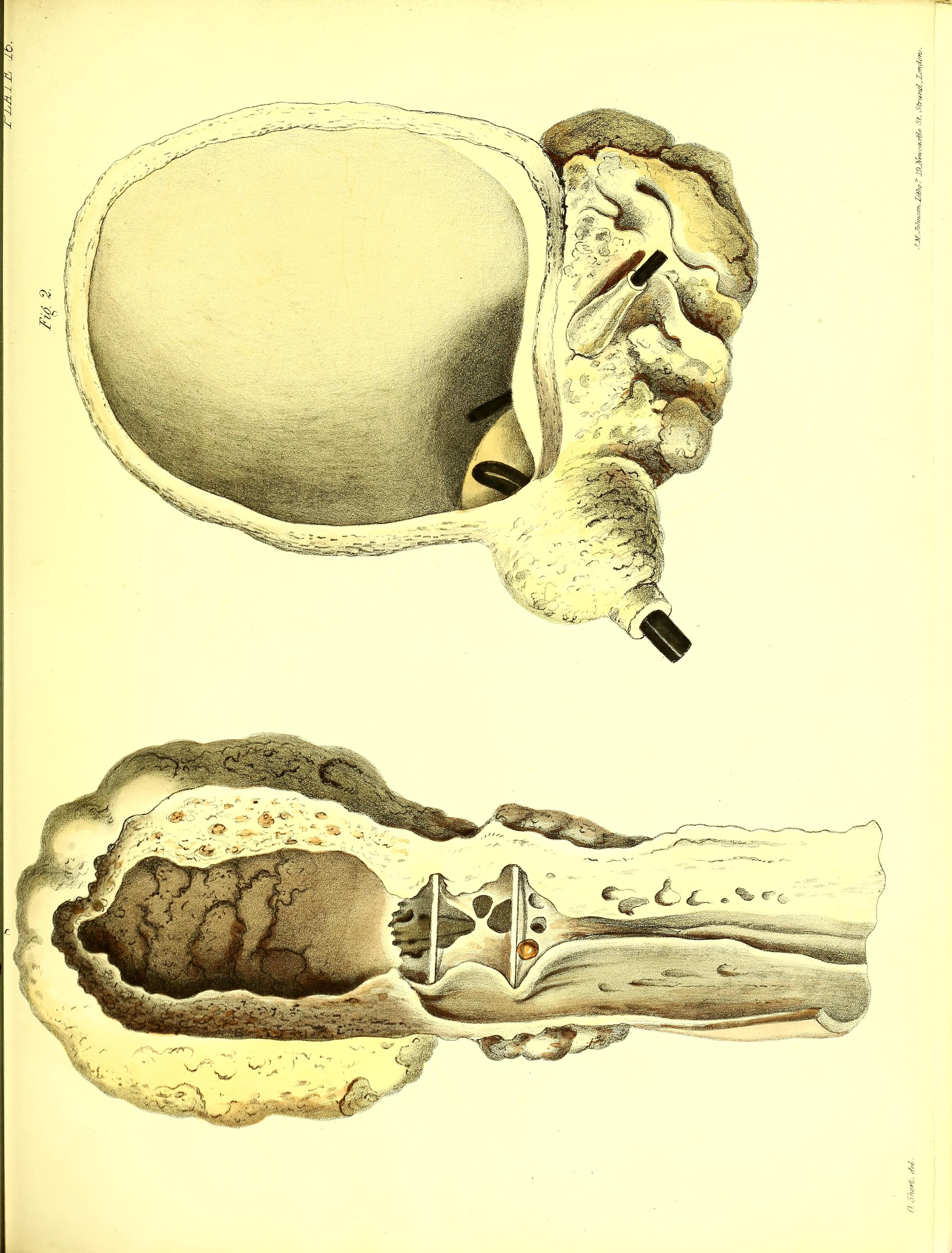
Plate 16

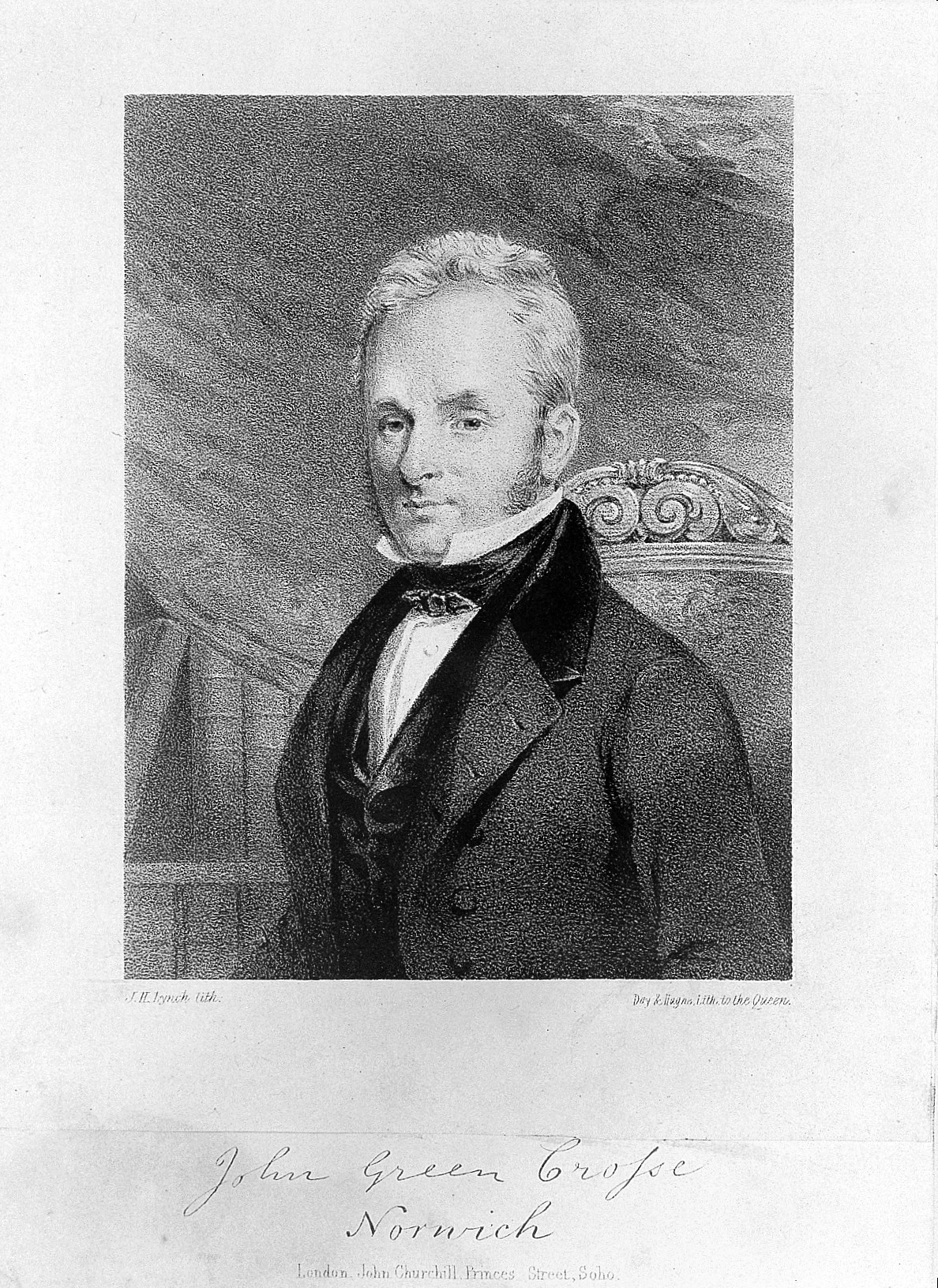
John Green Crosse

Two of Short's illustrations from Crosse's A Treatise On the Formation, Constituents, and Extraction of the Urinary Calculus (1835)

Short learnt the art of landscape painting by copying the works of Old Masters such as those at Holkham; his artistic style probably originated from his access to the Earl of Leicester's collection. He was influenced by the artist Alfred Priest, whom he met in about 1851, and possibly the London-born water colourist John Varley.

The Norwich surgeon John Green Crosse was fascinated by cases of bladder stones, and in 1833 produced an award-winning essay for the Royal College of Surgeons's Jacksonian Prize, entitled the "Formation, Constitution and Extraction of the Urinary Calculus". Short was commissioned to produce the drawings; he included O. Short, del. on each page. (Note: Crosse's biography, written by his granddaughter in 1968, named Crosse as the illustrator.)

The Norfolk Museums Collections has over 30 drawings and paintings by Short, as well as a sketchbook and some of his hand-written notes. His pictures of Mousehold Heath were drawn many years after most of the original heath had been enclosed by landowners. They depict the heath as treeless and free of human activity, but only because the viewpoint of each drawing deliberately points away from the Norwich skyline.

== Output, reputation and legacy ==
According to his obituary, Short produced a large number of oil paintings, described as always having a "charming choice of subject". Only four were exhibited in his lifetime. These were shown in the last two annual exhibitions of the Norwich Society of Artists in 1832 (Cottages at Thorpe and Beach Scene, Yarmouth) and in 1833 (Beach Scene at Corton and Scene at Trowse). His output was limited by being fully employed during his adult life. As a devout Christian he may well not have worked on Sundays, which would have limited the time he devoted to art. He first gained public recognition when three oil paintings and a watercolour, Landscape at Costessy, Norfolk, were shown.at the 1927 Loan Exhibition in Norwich.

Short most frequently painted tranquil landscapes of someone walking down a wooded country lane, or of cattle near the bank of a small river within a flat Norfolk landscape. In contrast to his usual style, he produced a series of twelve small watercolours of Mousehold Heath, praised by the art historian Derek Clifford for their "dark, rich tones". Sam Smiles' article Mousehold Heath, the Norwich School and Similar Landscapes Beyond uses Short's depictions of the heath as an example how the selected view point was crucial in enabling it to appear treeless and devoid of human activity.

Early art historians of the Norwich School of painters such as Dickes and Cundall did not mention Short, but more recent authors have praised his work, whilst still regarding him as a minor painter. Clifford rated him as a "pleasing minor talent" and the author Harold Day wrote that Short produced paintings that were charming, while describing him as "not one of the great men of the Norwich School". The Norfolk Museums Collections has the UK's only public collection of works by Short. Few historians have commented on Short's individual works, but for an exhibition of East Anglian art in 1975, which included Short's watercolour St Benet's Abbey, the reviewer noted that "the subject is so charming that one is in danger of missing Short's sensitive treatment of it".

Several of Short's paintings show buildings which have since been demolished; such works are now a source of information for historians. Examples include his depiction of the area around St Laurence's Church, Norwich on Westwick Street, a watercolour of Cromer, showing the town's early wooden pier in 1870, and paintings of buildings beside the River Yare at Thorpe and at New Mills. His painting of one of the Norwich's towers was used in Norwich City Council's survey of its city walls.

Shorts's paintings have been sold at auction. Landscape with Oak Trees, sold in 2005, fetched $2,758, and A View Of Cromer From The Northrepps Road was sold at auction in 2007 for $1,931. Other prices for his works have been lower, such as when £300 was fetched in 2017 for Whitlingham Lane, Norwich.

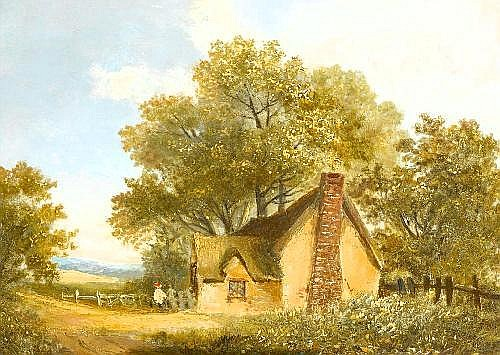
A Norfolk Cottage (undated)

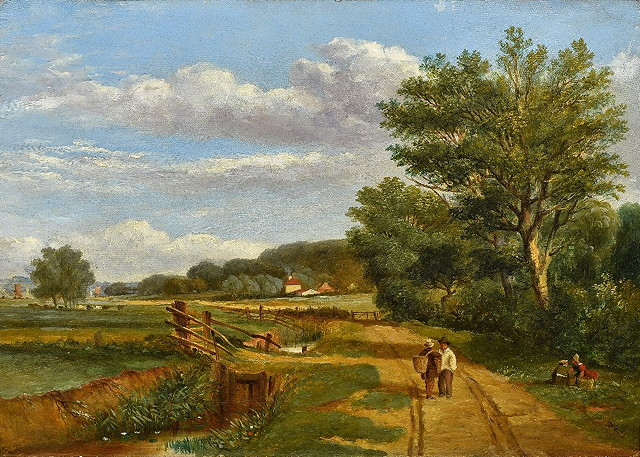
Whitlingham Lane, Norwich (undated, attributed)

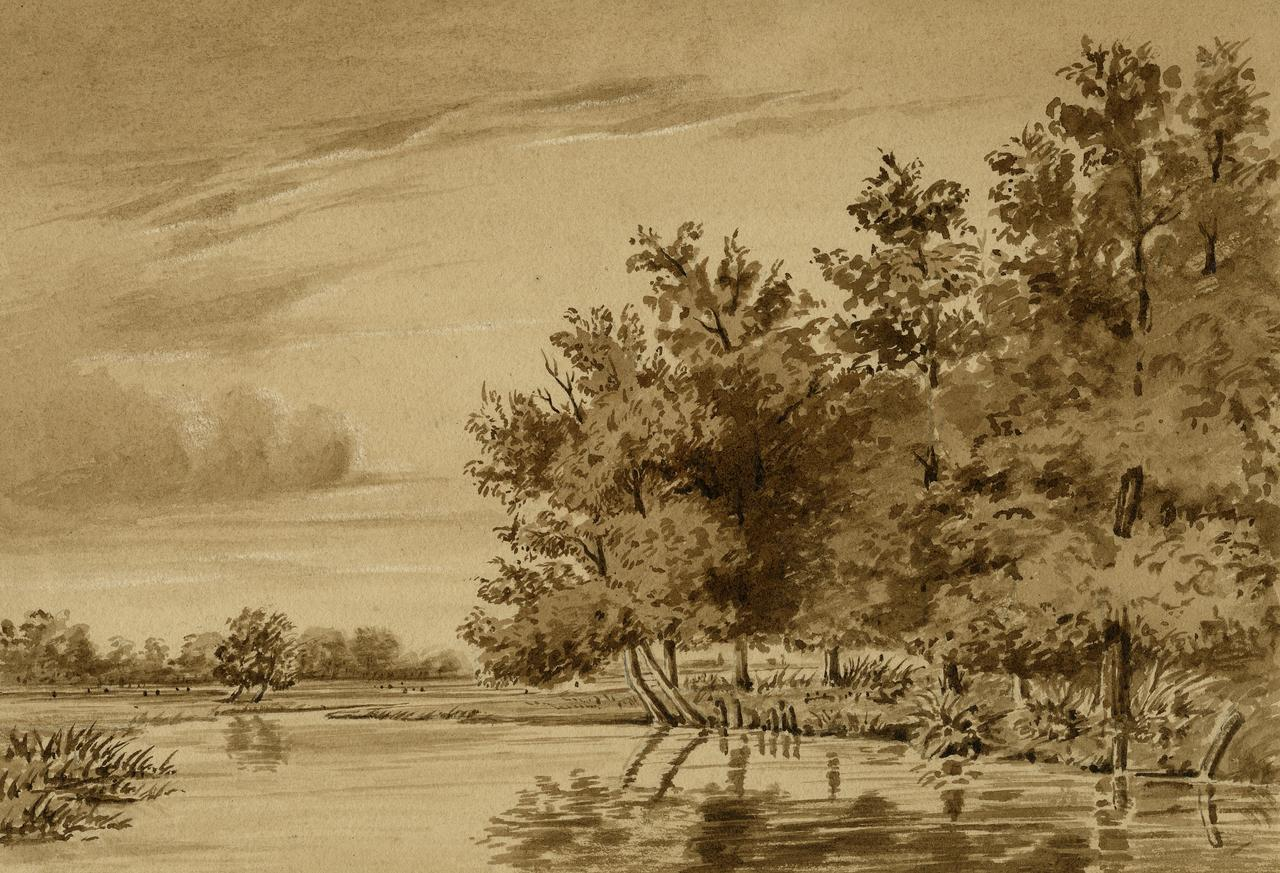
Riverside scene with meadows (undated), Norfolk Museums Collections

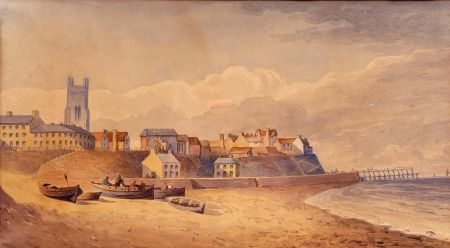
A View of Cromer showing the Early Pier, 1870

== Death ==
Obadiah Short died peacefully on 15 July 1886 at Heigham, Norwich, aged 82. His obituary, published in the Bury and Norwich Post a few days after his death, asked its readers to appreciate "a life not barren of interest to those who care to mark the events of a well-spent career", and "to notice the success of perseverance under difficulties". He was described as kindly, unambitious, undemanding, and a devout Christian, whose art was praiseworthy for its “charming choice of subject” and "delineation of foliage". His will was proved in Norwich (in which he was described as a 'Pattern drawer'), with his estate valued at £208.

== Bibliography ==
- Blyth, G. K. (1842). The Norwich Guide: Being a Description, Historical, Topographical, and Statistical, of the City and Its Hamlets; With an Account of the Public Charities, Etc. Norwich: Josiah Fletch.
- Cannon, Richard (1839). Historical Record of the Fourth, Or, the King's Own Regiment of Foot: Containing an Account of the Formation of the Regiment in 1680, and of Its Subsequent Services to 1839. London: Longman. ISBN 978-0-665-48386-8.
- Clabburn, Pamela (1995). The Norwich Shawl: Its History and A Catalogue of the Collection at Strangers Hall Museum, Norwich. London: Norfolk Museums Service. ISBN 978-0-11-701584-5.
- Clifford, Derek Plint (1965). Watercolours of the Norwich School. Cory, Adams & Mackay. OCLC 1624701.
- Cross, Victoria Mary (1968). A Surgeon in the Early Nineteenth Century: The Life and Times of John Green Crosse. Edinburgh and London: E.&S. Livingstone Ltd. ISBN 978-0-443-00563-3.
- Crosse, John Green (1835). A Treatise On the Formation, Constituents, and Extraction of the Urinary Calculus: Being the Essay for Which the Jacksonian Prize for the Year 1833 Was Awarded by the Royal College of Surgeons in London. Illustrated by Obadiah Short. London: John Churchill.
- Cundall, Herbert Minton (1920). The Norwich School. London: Geoffrey Holme Ltd.
- Day, Harold (1968). East Anglian Painters. Vol. II. Eastbourne, UK: Eastbourne Fine Art. ISBN 978-0-902010-10-9.
- Hemingway, Andrew (1979). The Norwich School of Painters 1803-1833. Oxford: Phaidon. ISBN 978-0-7148-2001-9.
- Hoyte, Helen (2010). The Story of the Norwich Shawl. Nick Williams. ISBN 978-0-9559320-2-1.
- Moore, Andrew (1985). The Norwich School of Artists. London: HMSO. ISBN 978-0-11-701587-6.
- Rajnai, Miklos; Stevens, Mary (1976). The Norwich Society of Artists, 1805-1833: a dictionary of contributors and their work. Norwich: Norfolk Museums Service for the Paul Mellon Centre for Studies in British Art. ISBN 978-0-903101-29-5.
- Short, Obadiah (1861). Recollections. (unpublished, now in the Norwich Museums Collections).
- Streeten, Robert N.J. (1845). "Norwich Hospital Museum". Provincial Medical and Surgical Journal: 595.
- Walpole, Josephine (1997). Art and Artists of the Norwich School. Woodbridge: Antique Collectors' Club. ISBN 978-1-85149-261-9.
- Wright, Christopher; Gordon, Catherine (2006). British and Irish Paintings in Public Collections : An Index of British and Irish Oil Paintings by Artists Born Before 1870 in Public and Institutional Collections in the United Kingdom and Ireland. New Haven: Yale University Press. pp. 790–1. ISBN 978-0-300-11730-1.
