= Lavinia Crosse =

English Anglican nun (1821–1890)

Lavinia Crosse (16 December 1821 – 26 June 1890) was an English Anglican nun and foundress. She founded the Community of All Hallows in Ditchingham, Norfolk in 1855.

== Biography ==
Crosse was born on 16 December 1821. She was the daughter of the Norwich surgeon and physician John Green Crosse (1790–1850) and his wife Dorothy Crosse (née Bayly, 1792–1870), the daughter of Thomas Bayly of Stowmarket. She had three sisters and four brothers.

Alongside Catherine Hansell, Crosse volunteered as a district visitor among the poor in the parish of St Peter Mancroft. In March 1854, Crosse heard John Armstrong speak at the Norwich Assembly Rooms in support of the founding of a penitentiary at Shipmeadow, near Beccles in Suffolk, to rescue girls and women in "moral danger." Shortly after, on 9 January 1855, Crosse was asked by the council of the penitentiary to supervise this home, as the founder wished to withdraw.

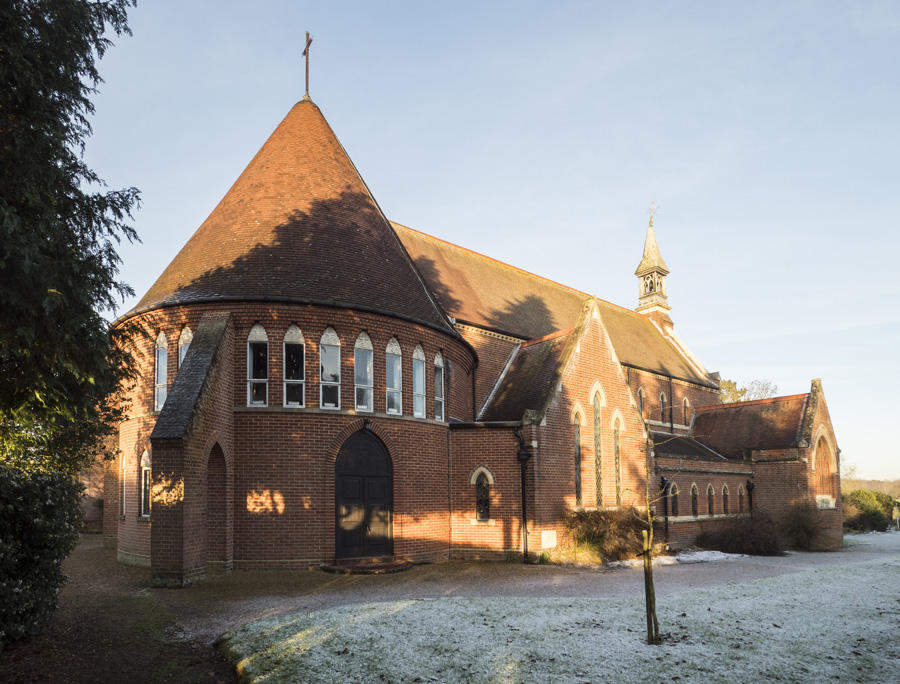
The All Hallows Convent Chapel in 2017

Visits to similar penitentiaries and convents on the European continent convinced Crosse that the best way forward was as a religious sisterhood, and she founded the Anglican Community of All Hallows near Ditchingham, which was constructed by Henry Woodyer.

New Year's Eve 1855 saw the inauguration of the community by Thomas Thellusson Carter of Clewer, with Mother Lavinia and two novices being received. The original community could receive 30 penitents and worked in conjunction with the Church Penitentiary Association. Mother Lavinia remained as mother superior throughout her life, overseeing the addition of an orphanage (for girls aged 3 to 10), a school, and a hospital which could hold 20 patients to the community.

Crossed died on 26 June 1890, Aldeburgh, Suffolk, after a long illness.

She was buried at Ditchingham parish cemetery in Norfolk, the parish adjacent to the Community of All Hallows.
