= Charles Scudamore =

English physician (1779–1849)

Sir Charles Scudamore (1779–1849) was an English medical doctor, known for his writings on gout.

== Life ==
The third son of William Scudamore, a surgeon, and his wife Elizabeth Rolfe, he was born at Wye, Kent, where his father was in practice. He was educated at Wye grammar school, of which the Rev. Philip Parsons was then master. He began his medical education as apprentice to his father, and continued it at Guy's Hospital and St. Thomas's Hospital in London for three years. He then settled in practice as an apothecary at Highgate, and there remained for ten years. He began medical study at Edinburgh in 1813, and graduated M.D. at Glasgow University on 6 May 1814. He was admitted a licentiate of the College of Physicians of London, 30 September 1814, and began practice as a physician in Holles Street, London.

Every year Scudamore spent time at Buxton, and was physician to the Buxton Bath Charity. In 1820 he was appointed physician to Prince Leopold of Saxe-Gotha. He attended the novelist Ann Radcliffe at her death in 1823; surviving records have led to the suggestion that Scudamore's prescriptions worsened her condition. In 1824 he was elected a Fellow of the Royal Society.

Scudamore went to Ireland in March 1829 in attendance on Hugh Percy, 3rd Duke of Northumberland, then appointed Lord Lieutenant of Ireland, who knighted him at Dublin on 30 September 1829. He was also admitted an honorary member of Trinity College, Dublin, during his stay in Ireland. He died in his London house, 6 Wimpole Street, of disease of the heart, 4 August 1849. He is buried at Kensal Green Cemetery, London.

== Works ==
In 1818 Scudamore published the book by which he is best known A Treatise on the Nature and Cure of Gout, dedicated to Matthew Baillie, and based on the author's observation of about 100 cases of gout. He attributed the rarity of gout in Glasgow to the constant walking even of the rich citizens. He was the first English author who mentions the frequent presence of a circular chest, instead of an elliptical one, in persons subject to gout. He gave also abstract of major works on gout, and older pathological theories. He showed little capacity for observing disease at the bedside, but had acquaintance with morbid anatomy. A second edition appeared in 1817, a third in 1819, and a fourth in 1823. In 1839 he printed a Letter to Dr. Chambers on gout, repeating his former views.

- His thesis De Arthritide, published at Glasgow, 1814.
- An Analysis of the Mineral Water of Tunbridge Wells, 1816.
- A Chemical and Medical Report of the Properties of the Mineral Waters of Buxton, Matlock, Tunbridge Wells, Harrogate, Bath, Cheltenham, Leamington, Malvern, and the Isle of Wight (1820)
- The Analysis and Medical Properties of the Tepid Springs of Buxton, with Cases and Observations (1820, 1839).
- An Essay on the Blood (1824)
- Observations on the Use of the Colchicum Autumnale in the Treatment of Gout (1825)
- Observations on M. Laennec's Method of Forming a Diagnosis of the Diseases of the Chest (1826)
- A Treatise on the Nature and Cure of Rheumatism (1827). Rheumatic fever was beginning to be separated in medical writings from chronic rheumatism; but the relationship of heart disease to rheumatic fever, though known from clinical teaching of David Pitcairn, was not widely understood. Scudamore treated rheumatic fever by bleeding, purgatives, colchicum, tartar emetic, opium, and quinine.
- Cases illustrating the Remedial Power of the Inhalation of Iodine and Conium in Tubercular Phthisis, 1830, second edition 1834.
- A Further Examination of the Principles of the Treatment of Gout, with Observations on the Use and Abuse of Colchicum (1833)
- A Medical Visit to Gräfenberg, in April and May 1843 for the Purpose of Investigating the Merits of the Water-cure Treatment (1843)
- On Pulmonary Consumption (1847)

== Family ==
In 1811 Scudamore married Georgiana Johnson; they had no children. His nephew was the prominent Church of England priest and author William E. Scudamore.

== Notes ==
Attribution

This article incorporates text from a publication now in the public domain: Lee, Sidney, ed. (1897). "Scudamore, Charles". Dictionary of National Biography. Vol. 51. London: Smith, Elder & Co.
