= Chicken roundabout =

Roundabout in Suffolk, United Kingdom

Coordinates: 52°27′50″N 1°26′31″E

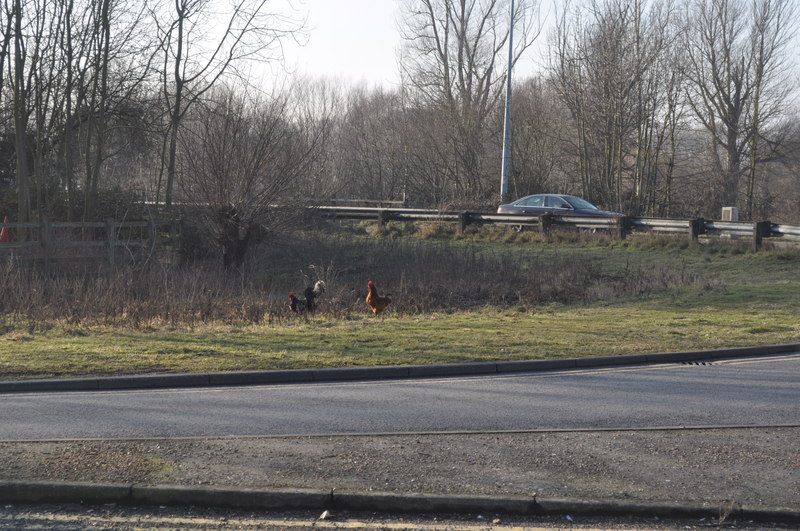
Chicken roundabout, with two chickens visible

The chicken roundabout is a roundabout located on the A143 road, on the Bungay and Ditchingham bypass in Suffolk, United Kingdom. The roundabout was famous for being the habitat for a large group of feral chickens, which were fed and cared for by a local man until their numbers declined and they were relocated in 2010.

== History ==
The poultry pre-dated the roundabout, having lived at the site for decades before its construction. They are thought to have escaped from an allotment and survived on grain from a nearby maltings, which burned down in 1999. They were fed and cared for by Bungay resident Gordon Knowles for almost two decades, during which time they at one point numbered 300.

In 2000, Norfolk County Council planned to move the birds over safety concerns but backtracked following protests. In 2002 the flock was threatened again when campaigners reported the chickens were being "systematically – we think – stolen and sold".

2006 saw an increase in numbers, to a total of over 100, thought to be the result of pet owners' fears over avian flu; and a decline, attributed to people feeding them rat poison, which led to their numbers being reduced to around six.

In July 2009, some 70 chickens went missing from the flock of around 100. An RSPCA inspector commented that "Some may have been taken by foxes or other natural predators, but there is a possibility that others may have [been] stolen or harmed." In 2010 the remaining six birds were given to an animal charity. Knowles said he would stop looking after the chickens as he could no longer bear to see them maltreated.

In 2012, a plaque was unveiled celebrating Knowles's work, and a ceremony held at which Bungay town councillor Deirdre Shepherd described Knowles as "a living legend" and "one of the last of the great eccentrics". Also in 2012 a campaign was launched to commemorate the chickens with a series of statues; however in January 2013 Ditchingham Parish Council blocked plans for the "Chicken of the East" statue, which it described as a safety hazard.

In February 2013, a group of five miniature hens were left on the roundabout, but were relocated days later. Gordon Knowles, known as the "Chicken Man of Bungay", died in January 2020.
