= Jimmy Lewis (cricketer) =

English cricketer

Personal information
- Full name: James Christopher Mansel Lewis
- Born: 3 October 1967 (age 59); Ditchingham, Norfolk, England
- Batting: Left-handed
- Bowling: Right-arm fast-medium

Domestic team information
- Years: Team
- 1987–1994: Norfolk

Career statistics
Competition	List A
Matches	2
Runs scored	10
Batting average	5.00
100s/50s	–/–
Top score	9
Balls bowled	120
Wickets	2
Bowling average	51.50
5 wickets in innings	–
10 wickets in match	–
Best bowling	2/66
Catches/stumpings	1/–
- Source: Cricinfo, 29 June 2011

James Christopher Mansel Lewis (born 3 October 1967) is a former English cricketer. Lewis was a left-handed batsman who bowled right-arm fast-medium. He was born in Ditchingham, Norfolk.

Lewis made his debut for Norfolk in the 1987 Minor Counties Championship against Cambridgeshire. Lewis played Minor counties cricket for Norfolk from 1987 to 1994, which included 35 Minor Counties Championship matches and 9 MCCA Knockout Trophy matches. He made his List A debut against Yorkshire in the 1990 NatWest Trophy. In this match, was dismissed for 9 runs by Phil Carrick, while with the ball he bowled 8 wicket-less overs. He made a further List A appearance against Leicestershire in the 1992 NatWest Trophy. In this match, he was dismissed for a single run by Alan Mullally. With the ball, he took the wickets of Laurie Potter and Winston Benjamin for the cost of 66 runs from 12 overs.
