= William Edward Scudamore =

William Edward Scudamore (1813–1881) was a prominent Church of England priest, historian, liturgist, chaplain, and devotional author. His popular devotional manual Steps to the Altar reached its sixty-seventh edition in 1887, and was used extensively in North America and on the Indian subcontinent in addition to in Great Britain.

Scudamore was a nephew of the eminent physician of gout Sir Charles Scudamore. Educated initially in Belgium, he matriculated at St. John's College, Cambridge in 1831, where he received the degrees of B.A. (1835) and M.A. (1838). He was admitted as a fellow of the college on March 14, 1837. Scudamore was active in the organization of women's religious life in the Church of England, serving as chaplain to a church institution for women first at Shipmeadow in Suffolk and then at Ditchingham in Norfolk where he was rector of St. Mary's Church. This became the Community of All Hallows, whose Ditchingham convent closed in April 2018.

A moderate Anglo-Catholic, Scudamore entered into public controversy with the English Church Union over church calendar revision, wafer-bread, and non-communicating attendance at the Holy Communion.

== Bibliography ==
- Manual of Devotions for Confirmation and First Communion (1848)
- An Essay on the Office of the Intellect in Religion with Especial Reference to the Evidences of a Revelation, and the Proof of Christian Doctrine (1849)
- Letters to a Seceder from the Church of England to the Communion of Rome (1851)
- Steps to the Altar: A Manual of Devotions for the Blessed Eucharist (1853) (74 editions)
- The Abiding Holiness of God's House: A Sermon (1855)
- The Communion of the Laity: An Essay, Chiefly Historical, on the Rule and Practice of the Church with Respect to the Reception of the Consecrated Elements, at the Celebration of the Holy Eucharist (1855)
- England and Rome: A Discussion of the Principal Doctrines and Passages of History in Common Debate between the Members of the Two Communions (1855)
- The Working of the Good Leaven in the People and Church of England: A Sermon Preached at the Anniversary of the New Church at Sotherton, on S. Andrew's Day, 1855 (1856)
- An Account of the Penitentiary at Shipmeadow in a Letter to the Rev. James Davies (1857)
- Words To Take with Us: A Manual of Daily and Occasional Prayers for Private and Common Use, with Plain Instructions and Counsels on Prayer (1859)
- Litanies for Use at the Various Seasons of the Christian Year, before and after the Holy Communion, and on Other Occasions (1860)
- She Hath Done What She Could: A Sermon Preached at the Opening of the House of Mercy at Ditchingham, on S. Michael's Day, 1859 (1860)
- The North Side of the Table; What It Was: An Historical Inquiry (1870)
- Remarks on the Memorial and Petition to Convocation of the Council of the English Church Union (1872)
- An Exposure of the Authorized Reply of the Council of the English Church Union to W. E. Scudamore's Remarks on Its Memorial and Petition to Convocation (1873)
- ̔Η ̔Ωρα Της Προσευχης. The Hour of Prayer: Being a Manual of Devotion for the Use of Families and Schools (1873)
- Incense for the Altar: A Series of Devotions for the Use of Earnest Communicants, Whether They Receive Frequently or at Longer Intervals (1874)
- Notitia Eucharistica: A Commentary, Explanatory, Doctrinal, and Historical, on the Order for the Administration of the Lord's Supper or Holy Communion according to the Use of the Church of England, with an Appendix on the Office for the Communion of the Sick (1876)
- The Diocesan Synods of the Earlier Church (1878)
