= Corton, West Virginia =

Unincorporated community in West Virginia, United States

- Unincorporated community
- Location within West Virginia Location within the United States
- Coordinates: 38°29′22″N 81°16′31″W
- Country: United States
- State: West Virginia
- County: Kanawha
- Elevation: 617 ft (188 m)
- Time zone: UTC-5 (Eastern (EST))
  - Summer (DST): UTC-4 (EDT)
- Area codes: 304 & 681
- GNIS feature ID: 1554195

Corton is an unincorporated community in Kanawha County, West Virginia, United States. Corton is located on the Elk River and West Virginia Route 4, 4 miles (6.4 km) east of Clendenin.

The community's name is an amalgamation of the names of two businessmen in the gas industry: J. J. Cornwell and Mr. Tonkin.
