= John Green Crosse =

English surgeon

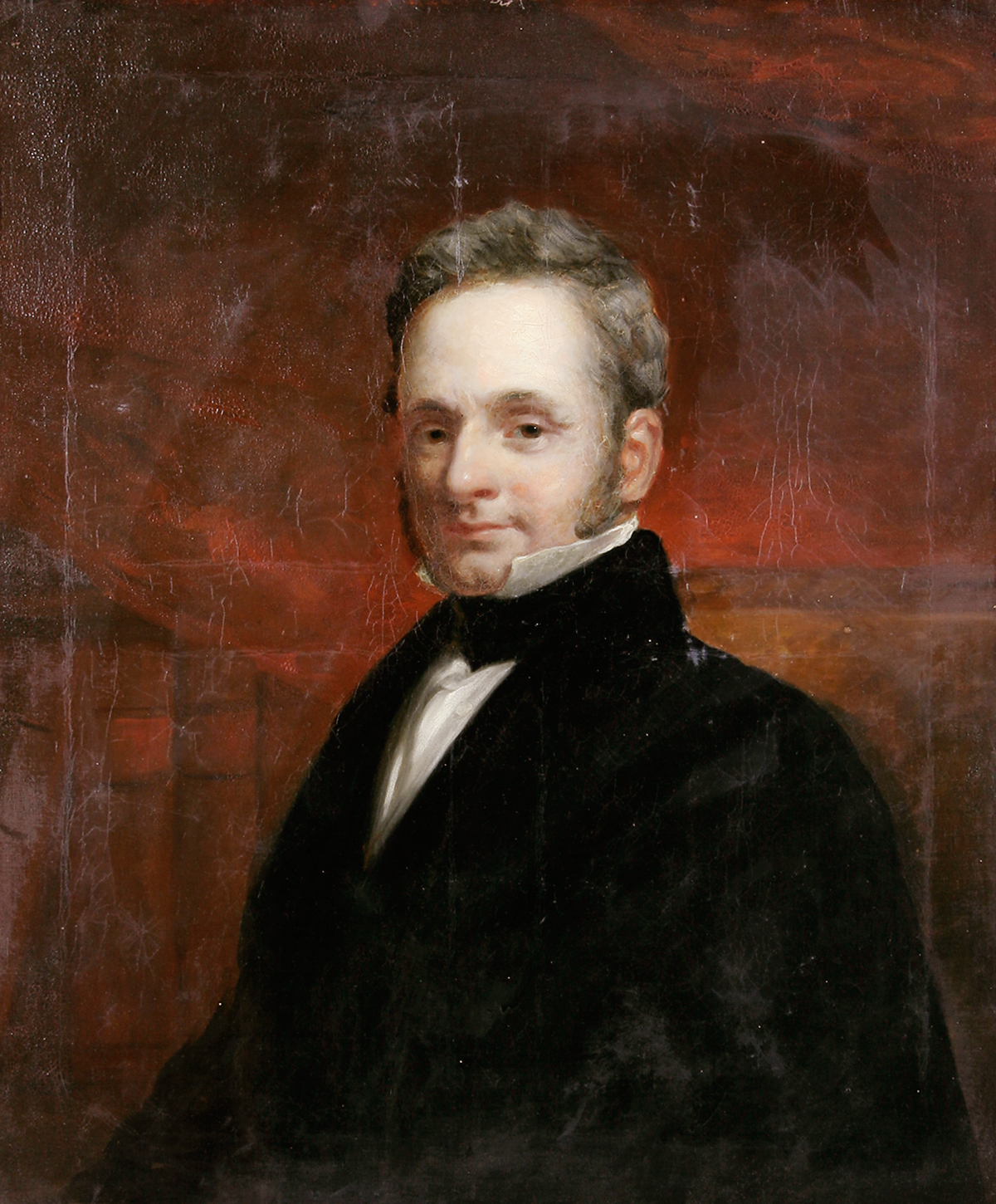
John Green Crosse

John Green Crosse, FRCS, FRS (6 September 1790 – 9 June 1850) was a well-known English surgeon of his day, at the Norfolk and Norwich Hospital. After completing his apprenticeship in Stowmarket, he studied at St. George's Hospital and at the Windmill Street School of Medicine in London. He then moved to Dublin and Paris, finally settling in Norwich in 1815. In 1823 he became assistant-surgeon to the Norfolk and Norwich Hospital, and in 1826 surgeon. His reputation as a lithotomist, and in 1836 he was elected a Fellow of the Royal Society.

Among his publications were Sketches of the Medical Schools of Paris, describing hospital practice there, and A History of the Variolous Epidemic which occurred in Norwich in the year 1819. Crosse worked on bladder stones. In 1833 he won the Jacksonian prize of the Royal College of Surgeons of England for The Formation, Constituents, and Extraction of the Urinary Calculus.

== Life ==
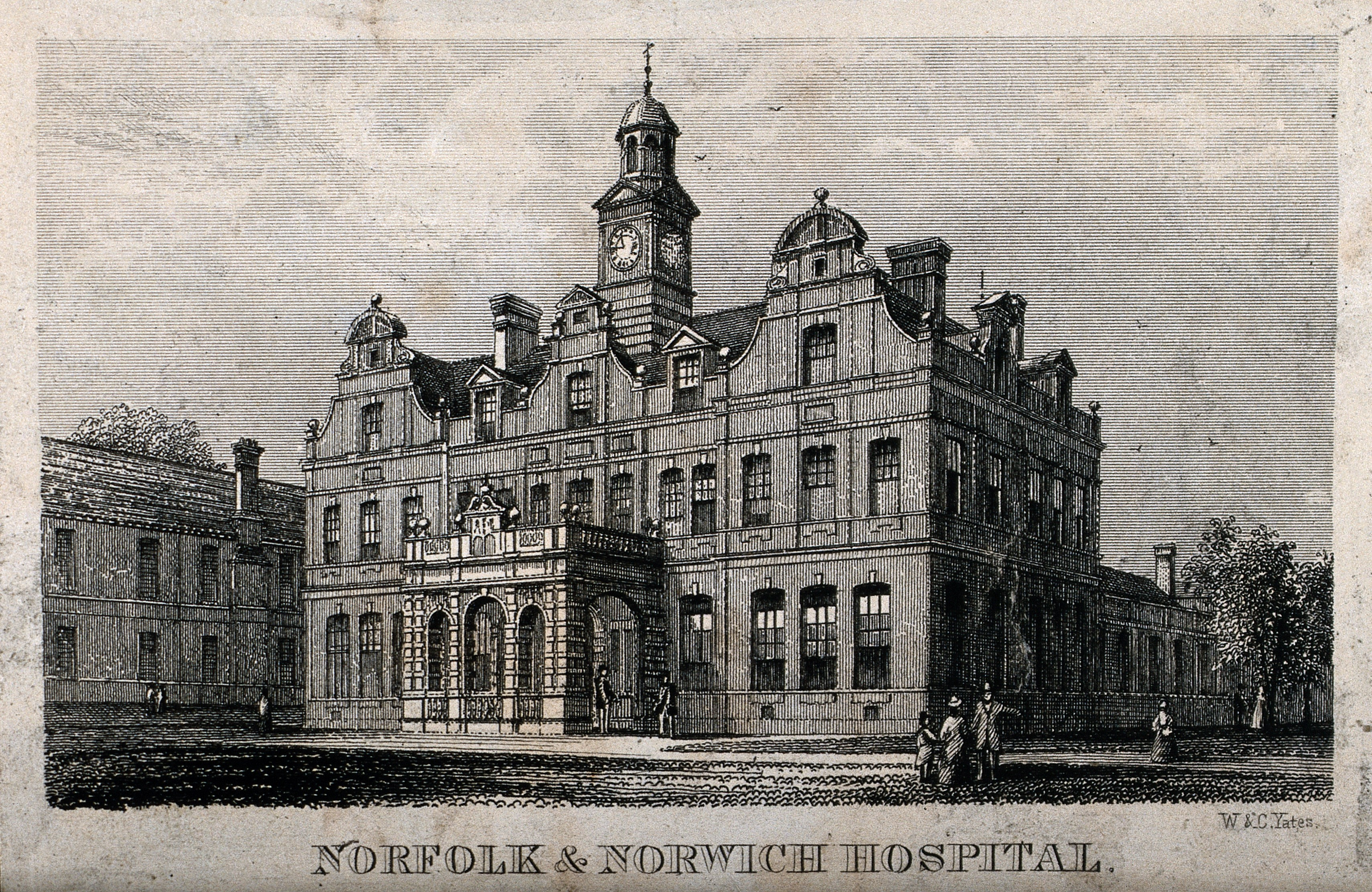
Norfolk and Norwich Hospital, Norwich (line engraving by W. Wellcome)

Crosse was born on 6 September 1790, at Boyton Hall, Great Finborough, Suffolk, the second son of William Cross, a farmer, and Ann (née Green).

At an early age he was apprenticed to Thomas Bayly, a surgeon-apothecary in Stowmarket. When his apprenticeship was finished he went to London, and studied at St. George's Hospital and at the Windmill Street School of Medicine. Benjamin Brodie then recommended him to James Macartney as a demonstrator at Trinity College, Dublin. Not receiving a diploma there, Crosse (who had added an 'e' to his surname in line with several of his paternal ancestors) left Dublin and went to Paris, where he spent the winter of 1814–15. In March 1815 he settled in Norwich.

In 1823 Crosse became assistant-surgeon to the Norfolk and Norwich Hospital, and in 1826 surgeon. He became known as a lithotomist, and had a large surgical practice.

In 1836 Crosse was elected a Fellow of the Royal Society. He had a series of 40 apprentices, among them George Murray Humphry. In 1827, he was elected as a member to the American Philosophical Society. In 1848 his health began to fail. He died on 9 June 1850, and was buried in the cloisters of Norwich Cathedral.

== Works ==
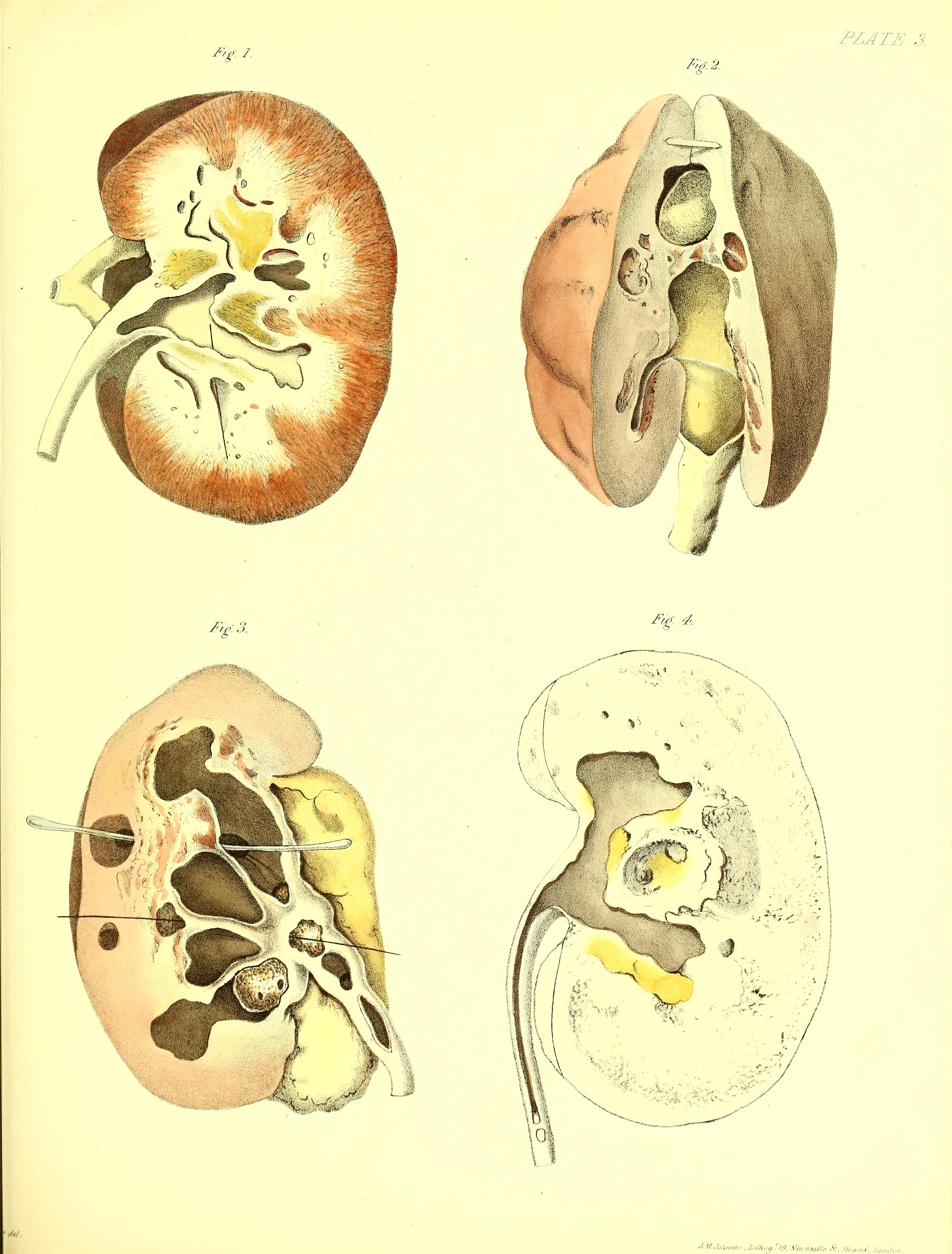
Plate 3 from A treatise on the formation, constituents, and extraction of the urinary calculus

Crosse wrote letters describing hospital practice of Paris to friends in London and Dublin, and on his return published them as a book Sketches of the Medical Schools of Paris. He was mainly interested in anatomy and surgery, and scarcely mentions physicians of Paris; he thought the London education better, except that there were good lectures on medical jurisprudence in Paris, and at that time none in London. In 1820 he published A History of the Variolous Epidemic which occurred in Norwich in the year 1819. It contains an account of the progress of vaccination in the eastern counties.

Crosse worked with his colleague John Yelloly on bladder stones, and their results were published in Philosophical Transactions in 1829 and 1830. In 1833 he obtained the Jacksonian prize of the Royal College of Surgeons of England for a work on The Formation, Constituents, and Extraction of the Urinary Calculus, which was published in 1835, with illustrations by the Norwich artist Obadiah Short. He also published several papers in the Transactions of the Provincial Medical and Surgical Association, of which he was president in 1846; and some cases of midwifery written by him were published after his death by Dr. Copeman, one of his pupils.

== Family ==
Crosse married Dorothy, daughter of Thomas Bayly of Stowmarket (as above), on 18 May 1816, at the Church of St. Peter and St. Mary, Stowmarket. Lavinia Crosse was the third of the couple's eight children.
