= Feral chicken =

Bird

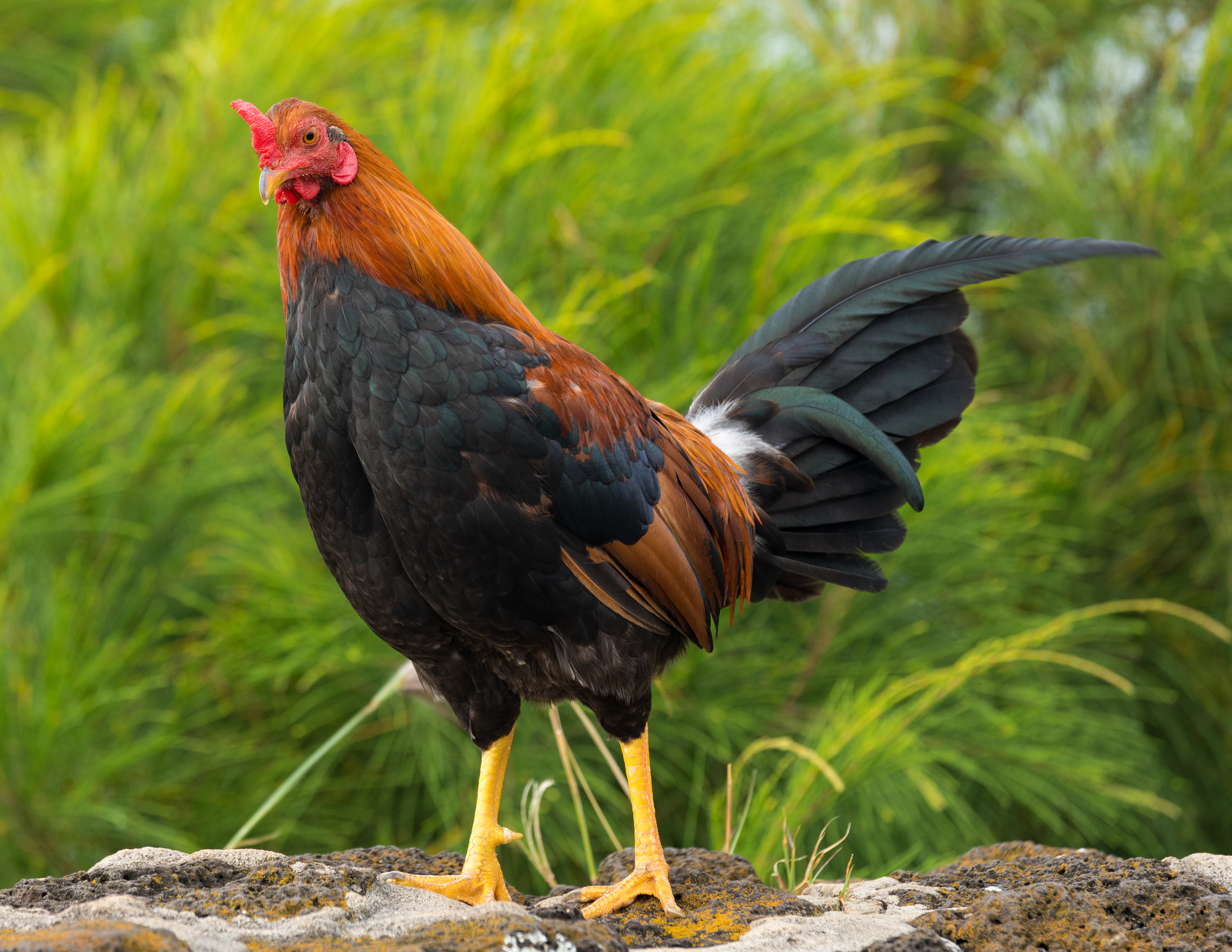
A feral rooster on the island of Kauai

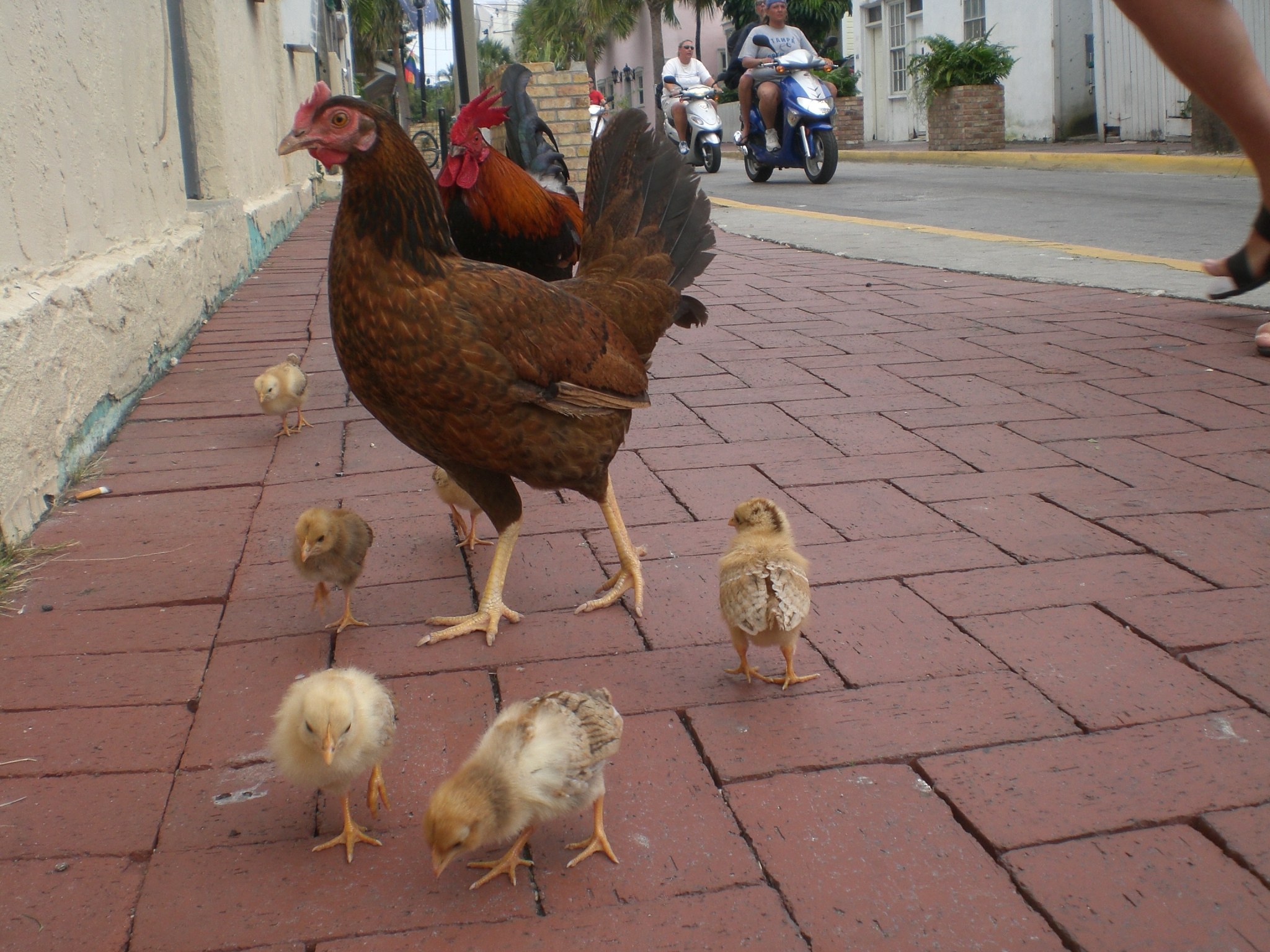
A family of feral chickens, Key West, Florida

Feral chickens are derived from chickens (Gallus domesticus) who have returned to the wild. Like the red junglefowl (the species from which chickens were domesticated), feral chickens will roost in bushes in order to avoid predators at night.

Feral chickens typically form social groups composed of a dominant cockerel, several hens, and subordinate cocks. Sometimes the dominant cockerel is designated by a fight between cocks. They lay anywhere from 24 to 60 eggs per year being considerably lower from domestically living hens, which produce 300+ eggs per year and closer to their wild ancestors, the red junglefowl which lays 8 to 18 eggs per year. The lower egg count is due to the process of feralization, where domestic animals may partially regain their wild properties when reintroduced to the wild. Farm chickens that have been bred to produce as many eggs as possible, may lay fewer eggs when reintroduced to the wild.

As chickens are reintroduced to the wild, natural selective pressures can take over again leading to higher genetic diversity. On the island of Kauai, the feral chickens had higher pooled heterozygosity (mean 0.36 s.d. 0.036) compared to domestic chickens (mean 0.29 s.d. 0.031).

== Locations famous for feral chickens ==
=== America ===
- Bermuda
- British Virgin Islands
- Fitzgerald, Georgia, United States
- George Town, Grand Cayman, Cayman Islands
- Gotha, Florida, United States
- Houston, Texas, United States
- Kauai, Hawaii, United States
- Key West, Florida, United States
- Key Largo, Florida, United States
- Los Angeles, California, United States
- Maui, Hawaii, United States
- Miami, Florida, United States
- New Orleans, Louisiana, United States
- Oviedo, Florida, United States, The feral chicken population has seemingly declined
- St. Augustine, Florida, United States
- San Juan Bautista, California, United States
- Vieques, Puerto Rico, United States
- Virgin Islands, U.S.
- Yuba City, California, United States
- Ybor City, Florida, United States

=== Asia ===
- Israel, Jaffa

=== Europe ===
- Chicken Roundabout, Bungay, England
- Nieuw Binckhorst, Den Haag, The Netherlands

=== Oceania ===
- Forests of Guam, although not significantly integrated into the trophic levels in this location
- Galston Gorge, Sydney, Australia
- Niue, New Zealand
- Port Chalmers, New Zealand

== See also ==
- Bekisar – a first-generation hybrid offspring of the wild Green junglefowl and domesticated Red junglefowl
- Hollywood Freeway chickens
- Chickens as pets
- Feral pigeon
- Feral parrot
