= Broome Heath =

Nature reserve in Norfolk, England

Coordinates: 52.470°N 1.453°E

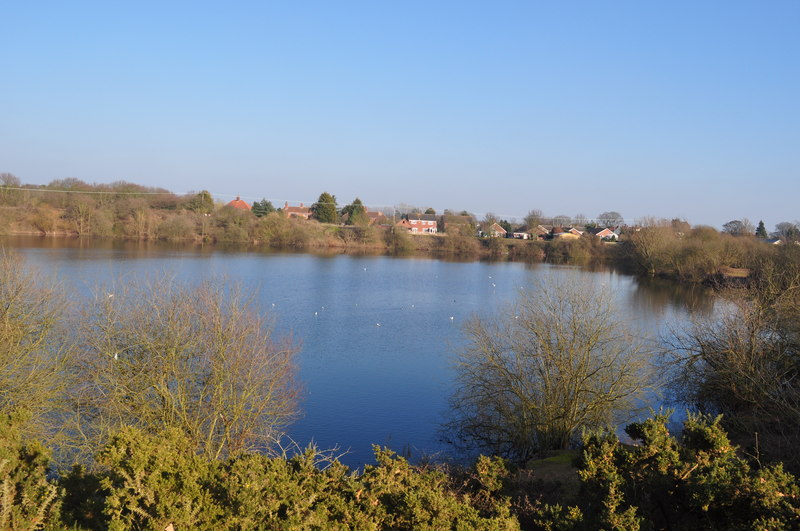
- Interactive map of Broome Heath
- Type: Local Nature Reserve
- Location: Ditchingham, Norfolk
- OS grid: TM 346 914
- Area: 31.7 hectares (78 acres)
- Manager: Broads Authority

Broome Heath is a 31.7-hectare (78-acre) Local Nature Reserve in Ditchingham in Norfolk, England. It is owned by South Norfolk District Council and managed by the Broads Authority. An area in the north is designated a geological Site of Special Scientific Interest as Broome Heath Pit, and there is a Scheduled Monument in the middle.

This site in the valley of the River Waveney has marshy grazing land and lakes. At the southern end there is a Neolithic settlement, and in the middle there are long and round barrows.

There is access from Loddon Road.
