= Ditchingham =

Village in Norfolk, England

Coordinates: 52.46676°N 1.44351°E

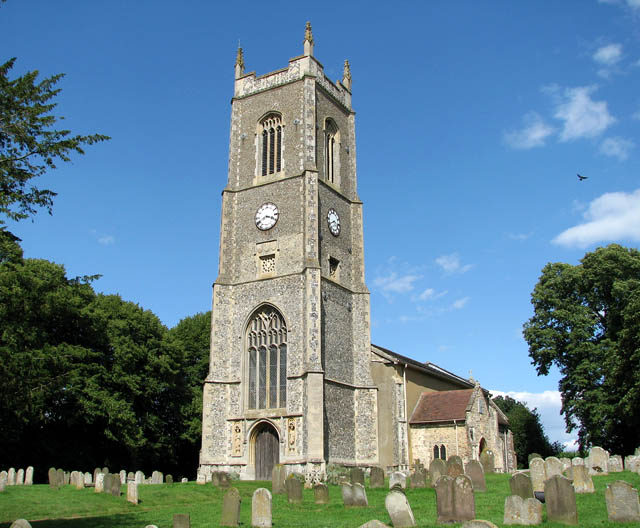
- St. Mary's Church

- Location within Norfolk
- Area: 8.56 km^{2} (3.31 sq mi)
- Population: 1,823 (2021 census)
  - Density: 213/km^{2} (550/sq mi)
- OS grid reference: TM 340 910
  - London: 93 miles
- Civil parish: Ditchingham
- District: South Norfolk
- Shire county: Norfolk
- Region: East
- Country: England
- Sovereign state: United Kingdom
- Post town: BUNGAY
- Postcode district: NR35
- Dialling code: 01986
- Police: Norfolk
- Fire: Norfolk
- Ambulance: East of England
- UK Parliament: Waveney Valley

Ditchingham is a village and civil parish in the English county of Norfolk.

Ditchingham is located 1.3 miles (2.1 km) north of Bungay and 12 miles (19 km) south-east of Norwich, along the course of the River Waveney.

== History ==
Ditchingham's name is of Anglo-Saxon origin and derives from the Old English for the homestead or settlement of 'Dicca's' people.

In the Domesday Book, Ditchingham is listed as a settlement of 36 households in the hundred of Lodding. In 1086, the village formed part of the East Anglian estates of King William I.

In 1855, an Anglican convent known as the Community of All Hallows was founded in Ditchingham by Lavinia Crosse and Reverend William E. Scudamore. The convent acted as a refuge for women in 'moral danger' and other destitute individuals. The community closed in 2018.

Lilias Rider Haggard's novel, The Rabbit Skin Cap (1939) tells the life story of George Baldry, a local inventor and poacher. The picture on the front cover of the book is a painting by Edward Seago of local schoolboy, Douglas Walter Gower. In later life, Gower discovered the tusk of a woolly mammoth near the long barrow on Broome Heath which is now displayed in Norwich Castle Museum.

Much of the surrounding countryside is part of the estate centred on Ditchingham Hall which was built in the 18th century and features gardens designed by Capability Brown. The Hall is the ancestral seat of the Earl Ferrers and is currently in the possession of Robert Shirley, 14th Earl Ferrers.

In the Nineteenth Century, a silk factory was built in Ditchingham which was later converted into a maltings and later use as a depot for the US Army during the Second World War. The building was severely damaged by fire in 1999 and is now in residential use.

== Geography ==
According to the 2021 census, Ditchingham has a total population of 1,823 people which demonstrates an increase from the 1,635 people listed in the 2011 census.

Ditchingham is located on the course of the River Waveney with the junction of the A143, between Gorleston-on-Sea and Haverhill, and the B1332, between Trowse and Ditchingham, is located in the parish.

== St. Mary's Church ==
Ditchingham's parish church is dedicated to Saint Mary and dates from the Fifteenth Century. St. Mary's is located on Church Lane and has been Grade I listed since 1960.

St. Mary's was restored in 1846 by Anthony Salvin and again in the 1870s by Frederick Preedy.The church boasts an interesting set of stained-glass windows depicting Edmund Tudor with Lady Margaret Beaufort as well as others which may have been imported from Europe after the Napoleonic Wars.

== Chicken Roundabout ==
Ditchingham's Chicken Roundabout had been home to a group of feral chickens as early as the mid-1990s, cared for by a local man called Gordon Knowles. The number of birds living at the roundabout increased and declined over the years due to a range of factors including Avian influenza and theft. In 2010, the remaining chickens were given to an animal charity with a plaque to Knowles' role in the community being erected in 2012.

== Amenities ==
Parravani's ice creams were established in the village in the early C20, and Lamberts Coaches are another long-established local company.

Ditchingham & District Men's Shed, Earsham, Bungay NR35 2AF. currently mornings only.https://menssheds.org.uk/find-a-shed/

== Notable residents ==
- Sir John Hobart, 3rd Baronet- (1628-1683) landowner and politician, born in Ditchingham.
- Philip Bedingfield MP- (d.1660) landowner and politician, lived in Ditchingham.
- R-Adm. Samuel Sutton- (1760-1832) Royal Navy officer, lived & died in Ditchingham.
- Lavinia Crosse- (1821-1890) founder of the Community of All Hallows, Ditchingham.
- Dr. James Franck Bright- (1832-1920) historian and academic, lived & died in Ditchingham.
- Sir H. Rider Haggard KBE- (1856-1925) author, lived & died in Ditchingham.
- William Carr- (1862-1925) biographer and historian, lived & died in Ditchingham.
- Diana Athill OBE- (1917-2019) novelist and editor, brought up in Ditchingham.
- Lt. Robert Shirley, Earl Ferrers- (1929-2012) politician and aristocrat, lived in Ditchingham.
- Kevin Steggles- (b.1961) Ipswich Town and Port Vale footballer, born in Ditchingham.
- Deb Murrell- (b.1966) cyclist, born in Ditchingham.
- Jimmy Lewis- (b.1967) Norfolk cricketer, born in Ditchingham.

== Governance ==
Ditchingham is part of the electoral ward of Ditchingham & Earsham for local elections and is part of the district of South Norfolk.

The village's national constituency is Waveney Valley which has been represented by the Green Party's Adrian Ramsay MP since 2024.

== War Memorial ==
Ditchingham War Memorial is located inside St. Mary's Church and is a brass structure including a life-sized prone statue of a British soldier created by Derwent Wood. The memorial lists the following names for the First World War:

Rank	Name	Unit	Date of death	Burial
Sgt.	Herbert H. Bird	2/6th Bn., Gloucestershire Regiment	19 Jul. 1916	Loos Memorial
Sgt.	Ernest W. Seeley	6th Bn., South Lancashire Regiment	10 Aug. 1915	Helles Memorial
LSgt.	Hubert G. Strowger	2nd Bn., Norfolk Regiment	31 Dec. 1916	Basra Memorial
Cpl.	Bertie A. Johnson	7th Bn., Suffolk Regiment	27 Mar. 1918	Pozières Memorial
Cpl.	J. William Sampson	7th Bn., Suffolk Regt.	27 Mar. 1918	Pozières Memorial
LCpl.	Harold C. Edmunds	1st Bn., Cambridgeshire Regiment	18 Sep. 1918	Épehy Wood Cemetery
LCpl.	Gordon C. Williams	1st Bn., Norfolk Regiment	30 Aug. 1918	Terlincthun Cemetery
Gnr.	Harry Runicles	86th Bde., Royal Field Artillery	9 Jul. 1916	Thiepval Memorial
Gnr.	George A. Smith	321st Bty., Royal Garrison Artillery	3 Jun. 1917	Lijssenthoek Cemetery
Pte.	Harold A. Fiske	A Coy., Army Service Corps	20 Apr. 1915	All Saints' Cemetery, Earsham
Pte.	Ernest A. Reynolds	8th Bn., Border Regiment	5 Jul. 1916	Thiepval Memorial
Pte.	Philip C. Simmons	5th Bn., The Buffs	28 Sep. 1916	North Gate War Cemetery
Pte.	Ralph R. Butcher	2nd Bn., Coldstream Guards	16 Sep. 1916	Lesbœufs Cemetery
Pte.	Daniel D. Fairhead	34th Bn., Royal Fusiliers	14 May 1918	St. Sever Cemetery
Pte.	Jacob E. Kent	1st Bn., Royal Irish Fusiliers	18 Apr. 1918	Tyne Cot
Pte.	Sidney Bird	76th Coy., Machine Gun Corps	29 Sep. 1917	Brandhoek Cemetery
Pte.	Albert V. Gorbel	1st Bn., Middlesex Regiment	26 Aug. 1916	Thiepval Memorial
Pte.	Reginald H. V. Dobbie	Wellington Regt., NZEF	8 Aug. 1915	Chunuk Bair Memorial
Pte.	Augustus G. Williams	1st Bn., Norfolk Regiment	25 Oct. 1914	Le Touret Memorial
Pte.	Harry Codling	1/4th Bn., Norfolk Regt.	20 Aug. 1915	Helles Memorial
Pte.	William H. Norman	8th Bn., Norfolk Regt.	22 Oct. 1916	Thiepval Memorial
Pte.	Arthur Gillingwater	9th Bn., Norfolk Regt.	13 May 1916	La Brique Cemetery
Pte.	Harry A. Hale	1st Bn., Northamptonshire Regiment	21 Dec. 1916	Caterpillar Valley Cemetery
Pte.	Kenneth R. Hamilton	1st Bn., Northamptonshire Regt.	19 Nov. 1916	St. Sever Cemetery
Pte.	Herbert Prior	2nd Bn., Queen's Royal Regiment	2 Apr. 1917	Croisilles Cemetery
Pte.	Alan G. Attoe	15th (Reserve) Bn., Rifle Brigade	1 Jan. 1918	Bungay Cemetery
Pte.	Arthur L. Garrould	15th Bn., Royal Scots	9 Apr. 1918	Three Trees Cemetery
Pte.	L. Claud Gray	1/4th Bn., Suffolk Regiment	29 Aug. 1916	Thiepval Memorial
Pte.	George H. Hansy	7th Bn., Suffolk Regt.	9 Sep. 1915	Nieppe Cemetery
Nurse	Mary A. Rodwell (Note: Nurse Rodwell was likely killed in the sinking of HMHS Anglia which struck a mine in the English Channel.)	Queen Alexandra's Nursing Corps	17 Nov. 1915	Hollybrook Cemetery

And, the following from the Second World War:

Rank	Name	Unit	Date of death	Burial
2Lt.	Jerome E. Treherne	Ox and Bucks Light Infantry	27 Jul. 1944	Hermanville War Cemetery
LAC	James C. Lambert	Royal Air Force Volunteer Reserve	31 Dec. 1941	St. Mary's Churchyard
Gnr.	Frederick A. Plumb	127th Bty., Royal Artillery	14 Feb. 1941	St. Mary's Churchyard
Pte.	Sidney D. Fairhead	5th Bn., Royal Norfolk Regiment	23 Jun. 1943	Kanchanaburi War Cemetery
Pte.	William Reeve	1st Bn., Hertfordshire Regiment	1 Dec. 1941	Knightsbridge War Cemetery
