= Corton Formation =

Geological formation in Great Britain

The Corton Formation is a series of deposits of Middle Pleistocene age found primarily along the coasts of Suffolk and Norfolk in eastern England.

The formation comprises two stratigraphic facies, an upper thicker fine to medium sand which becomes a pebbly sand towards the base (around Lowestoft, the pebbly sands may be more extensive), and a lower till comprising very silty sandy clay or clayey sand. The formation is named after Corton, Suffolk, the type locality for the Anglian Stage of the Pleistocene in Britain. The formation is overlain by the Lowestoft Formation.

The till of the Corton Formation, known locally as the Happisburgh Till and the Corton Till, was formerly believed to have been deposited by a Scandinavian ice sheet of Anglian age. However recent investigations indicate deposition by an ice sheet which flowed southwards into north-east East Anglia from central and southern Scotland, eroding and transporting materials derived from outcrops in these areas and from eastern England and the western margins of the southern North Sea Basin. This indicates that the long-held assumption that the tills of the Corton Formation were deposited by a Scandinavian ice sheet is erroneous and that they were instead deposited by Scottish ice. More recently still it has been suggested that the Happisburgh Till may be in fact be pre-Anglian. This is from indirect evidence, namely the discovery of clasts of re-worked till in the deposits of the Bytham River that are overlain by Anglian material (, discussed online in).

The sands of the Corton Formation have been interpreted as being deposited in an ice-dammed lake, possibly the one which overflowed to breach the chalk ridge of the Weald-Artois Anticline and open the English Channel.
