= Foxley Wood =

UK nature reserve

Coordinates: 52.760999°N 1.044183°E

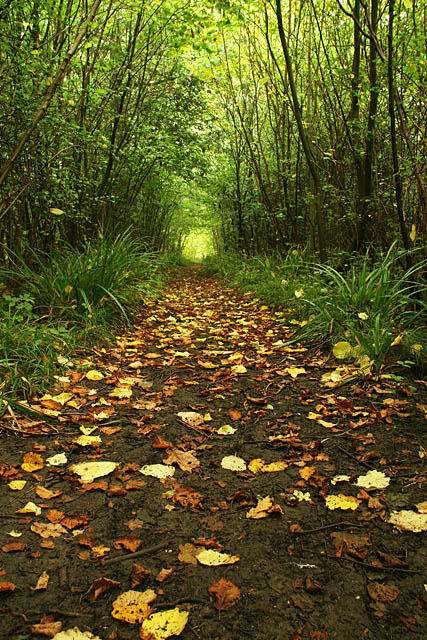
Woodland Pathway at Foxley Wood

Foxley Wood is a nature reserve in Foxley, Norfolk, England, the largest ancient woodland and coppice in Norfolk. The Norfolk Wildlife Trust, which manages this reserve, bought it in 1998. It is 123 hectares (300 acres) in size. It is a Site of Special Scientific Interest, a Nature Conservation Review site, Grade 2, and a National Nature Reserve.

== Location and history ==
Foxley Wood is 25 kilometres (16 mi) north-west of Norwich, 2 kilometres (1.2 mi) away from the Fakenham road (the A1067), near Honeypot Wood.

The nature reserve is currently the largest ancient woodland and coppice in Norfolk. The woodland is recorded in Domesday Book and parts of it are known to be over 6,000 years old. For the past 1,000 years, it was a source of wood (including hazel), but demand decreased in the 20th century. Because of the drop in demand, Foxley Wood became neglected. In the 1990s it was privately owned and managed by the Forestry Commission, and was acquired by the Norfolk Wildlife Trust in 1998.

It is open to the public every day except Thursday.

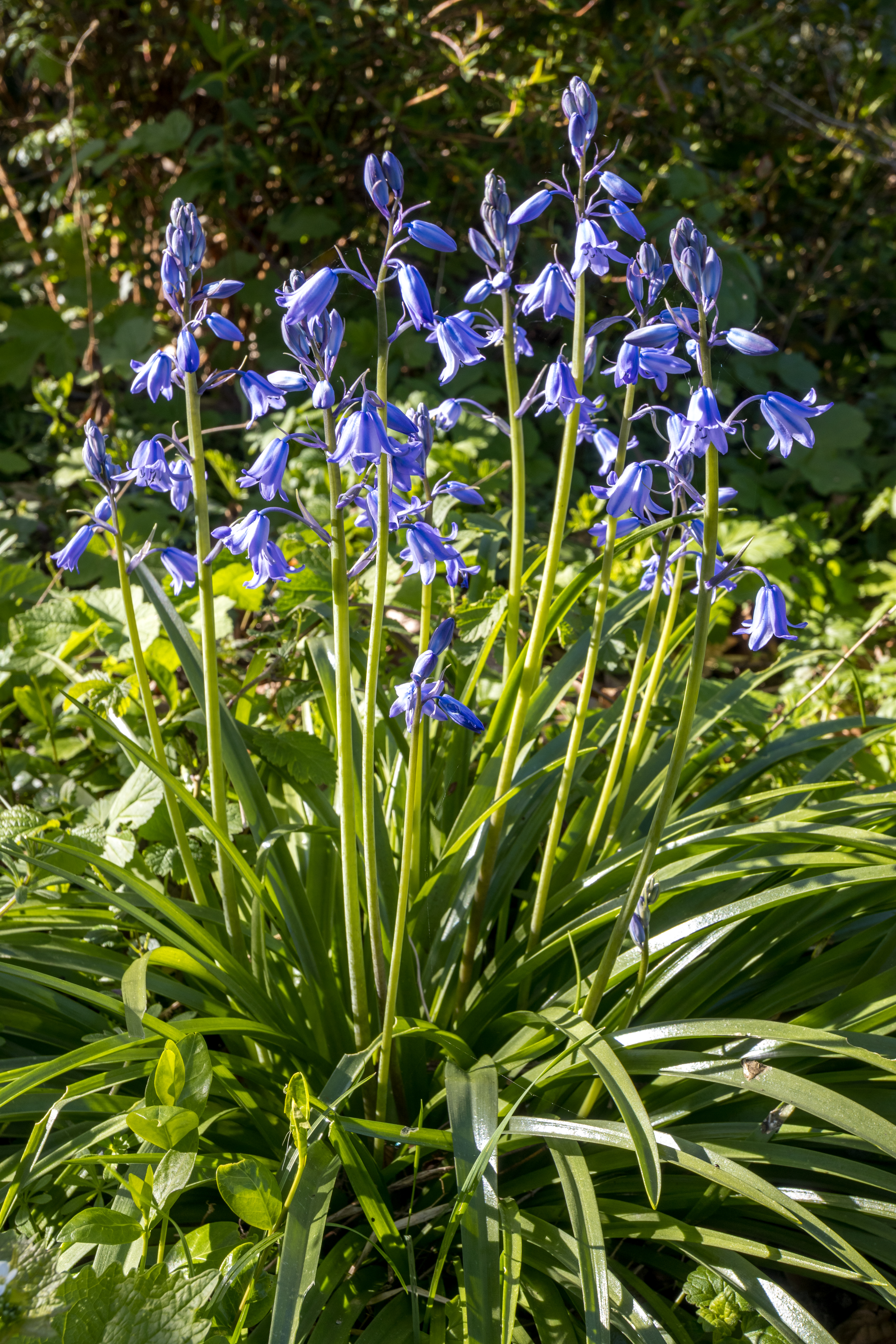
Hyacinthoides non-scripta (common bluebell)

== Flora and fauna ==
The woodland is rich in flora with over 250 species recorded. These include herb paris, early purple orchid, lily of the valley, common bluebell, dog's mercury, purple hairstreak, meadowsweet, water avens, fleabane (common name for flowering plants in family Asteraceae) and meadow brown. Bluebells are among the main attractions for visitors in spring.

Trees growing in the reserve include oak (found in the centre of the wood on sandy ground Conifers were planted throughout as timber, disturbing the original distribution of stand types; they are being removed. Areas have been indiscriminately sprayed with herbicides in the past.

Fauna include insects such as dark bush-crickets, white admiral and ringlet butterflies, and bird species such as sparrowhawks, tawny owls, great spotted woodpeckers and European green woodpeckers. Songbirds and sparrowhawks are popular sights.

Besides conifer planting, spraying with herbicides, and the cutting of all saleable trees (before the Forestry Commission began managing the wood), the wood is damaged by roads and ditches resulting from timber exploitation: "Foxley Wood has been badly damaged by modern forestry."
