= Foxley, Norfolk =

Village in Norfolk, England

Coordinates: 52.755412°N 1.021042°E

Foxley
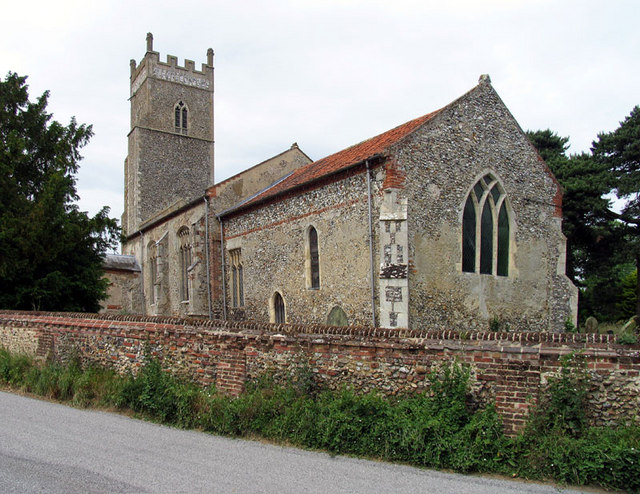
- St Thomas's Church, Foxley

- Location within Norfolk
- Area: 2.58 sq mi (6.7 km^{2})
- Population: 349 (2021 census)
  - Density: 135/sq mi (52/km^{2})
- OS grid reference: TG039218
  - London: 98 miles (158 km)
- Civil parish: Foxley
- District: Breckland
- Shire county: Norfolk
- Region: East
- Country: England
- Sovereign state: United Kingdom
- Post town: DEREHAM
- Postcode district: NR20
- Dialling code: 01362
- Police: Norfolk
- Fire: Norfolk
- Ambulance: East of England
- UK Parliament: Broadland and Fakenham

Foxley is a village and civil parish in the English county of Norfolk.

Foxley is 6 miles (10 km) north-east of Dereham and 15 miles (24 km) north-west of Norwich, along the A1067 between Fakenham and Norwich.

== History ==
Foxley's name is of Anglo-Saxon origin and derives from the Old English for fox clearing or glade.

Norfolk Heritage discusses the archaeology of the parish and states that there is evidence of a settlement here in the Saxon period. "The earliest prehistoric finds date to the Neolithic Era there was activity in the parish from much earlier than the Saxon period". The oldest building is the former Chequers Pub (NHER 19249) from the 1700s but a survey found carpenters' marks in the interior from 1624.

In the Domesday Book, Foxley is listed as a settlement of 12 households in the hundred of Eynesford. In 1086, the village was part of the East Anglian estates of Alan of Brittany.

Foxley Lodge is a former rectory constructed in the early 1840s. The style of the Lodge is Georgian, described in 1984 as "brick with slate roofs. Roughly square in plan. 2 storeys. 3 bays to each of 3 facades". The manor was restored in the 1930s; the property was operated as a dairy farm until some time before 2017. The property includes the seven bedroom manor, outbuildings, orchards, and three gardens which were planned by Verity Hanson-Smith.

Foxley Mill was built in 1845 by the miller, William Elvin, using a wind-powered mechanism. By the 1980s, the mill fell out of use and was subsequently used as an art gallery until 1990 when it was turned into a private residence.

In July 1944, two B-24 Liberators of the 392nd Bomb Group, USAAF, based at RAF Wendling, crashed in the parish after a mid-air collision. The crash site was a field to the west of the Old Rectory and fragments from the crashes are regularly ploughed up by local farmers.

== Geography ==
According to the 2021 census, Foxley has a population of 349 people which shows an increase from the 285 people recorded in the 2011 census.

Foxley is bisected by the A1067, between Fakenham and Norwich.

Foxley Wood is a site of special scientific interest and the largest remaining area of ancient woodland in Norfolk, England. Operated by the Norfolk Wildlife Trust, parts of the 123 hectare (300 acre) reserve are thought to be over 6000 years old, dating from the end of the last ice age. The reserve is a Nature Conservation Review site and a National Nature Reserve.

== St. Thomas' Church ==
Foxley's parish church is dedicated to Saint Thomas the Apostle and dates from the Fourteenth Century. The church is located within the village on The Street and has been Grade II listed since 1960. Today, the church still holds services on Sundays.

The interior of St. Thomas' is mainly the product of the Seventeenth Century but there is also a painted rood screendepicting saints which dates from 1472. The rood features some damage which was likely inflicted by iconoclasts in the reign of King Edward VI and, subsequently, repaired in the reign of Queen Mary I.

== Governance ==
Foxley is part of the electoral ward of Upper Wensum for local elections and is part of the district of Breckland.

The village's national constituency is Broadland and Fakenham which has been represented by the Conservative Party's Jerome Mayhew MP since 2019.

== War Memorial ==
Foxley War Memorial stands at the junction of the Norwich and Fakenham Roads and is a stone obelisk with a tapering plinth. The memorial lists the following names for the First World War:

Rank	Name	Unit	Date of death	Burial/Commemoration
Cpl.	James O. Armiger	2nd Bn., Royal Irish Rifles	24 Mar. 1918	Pozières Memorial
Pte.	Daniel W. Parfitt	1/4th Bn., Norfolk Regiment	25 Nov. 1917	Kantara War Cemetery
Rfn.	Edward Chaplain	1/21st (Surrey Rifles) Bn., London Regt.	10 Aug. 1916	Haute-Avesnes Cemetery

The following name was added after the Second World War:

Rank	Name	Unit	Date of death	Burial/Commemoration
LAC	Angus Ross	Royal Air Force Volunteer Reserve	11 Jun. 1943	Kirkee War Cemetery
