= Scarning Fen =

Nature reserve in Norfolk, England

Coordinates: 52.670°N 0.928°E

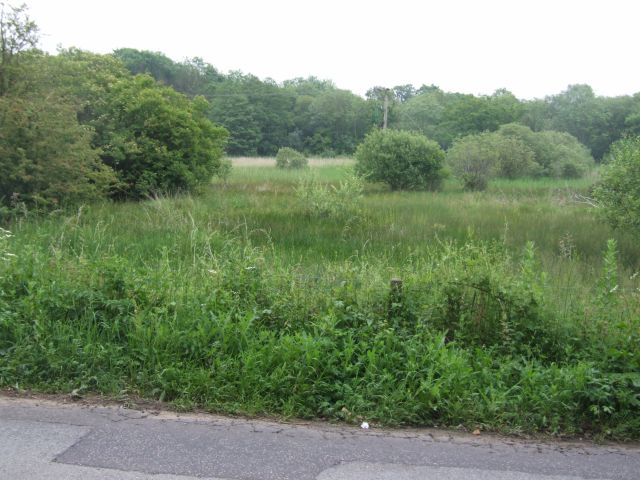
- Interactive map of Scarning Fen
- Type: Nature reserve
- Location: Norwich, Norfolk
- OS grid: TF 981 121
- Area: 4 hectares (9.9 acres)
- Manager: Norfolk Wildlife Trust

Scarning Fen is a 4-hectare (9.9-acre) nature reserve west in Dereham in Norfolk. It is managed by the Norfolk Wildlife Trust. It is a Nature Conservation Review site, Grade I, and is part of Potter and Scarning Fens Site of Special Scientific Interest and Norfolk Valley Fens Special Area of Conservation.

This small reserve has chalky valley mire, carr and grassland. Twenty-nine nationally scarce invertebrates have been recorded, and it is the only site in the county for the small red damselfly. There are a number of rare plants, including liverworts and mosses.
