= Bure Broads and Marshes =

UK Site of Special Scientific Interest

Coordinates: 52.690°N 1.473°E

- Site of Special Scientific Interest
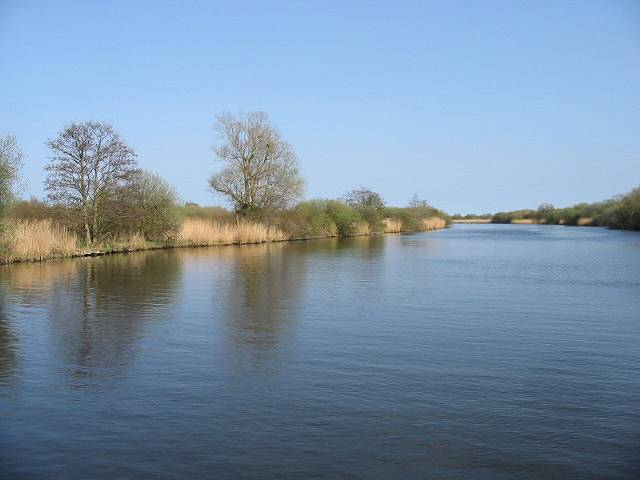
- Location of Bure Broads and Marshes.
- Area of search: Norfolk
- Grid reference: TG 348 159
- Interest: Biological
- Area: 741.1 hectares (1,831 acres)
- Notification date: 1991
- Location map: Magic Map

Bure Broads and Marshes is a 741.1-hectare (1,831-acre) biological Site of Special Scientific Interest north-east of Norwich in Norfolk, England. Most of it is a Nature Conservation Review site, Grade I and National Nature Reserve. Two areas are nature reserves managed by the Norfolk Wildlife Trust, Cockshoot Broad and Ranworth Broad. It is part of the Broadland Ramsar site and Special Protection Area and The Broads Special Area of Conservation.

This is described by Natural England as a "nationally and internationally important wetland complex", which is situated on fenland peats in the floodplain of the River Bure. A notable feature is an extensive area of swamp alder carr on unstable peats and mud. There are a number of rare bird and butterfly species.
