= Roydon Common =

UK Site of Special Scientific Interest

Coordinates: 52.773°N 0.501°E

- Site of Special Scientific Interest
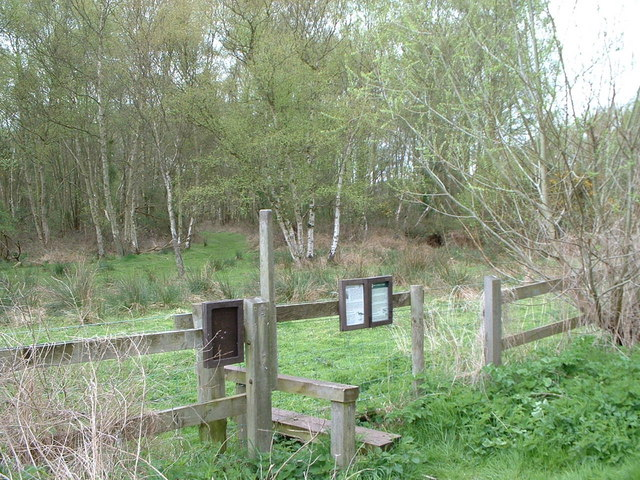
- Location of Roydon Common.
- Area of search: Norfolk
- Grid reference: TF 686 224
- Interest: Biological
- Area: 194.9 hectares (482 acres)
- Notification date: 1984
- Location map: Magic Map

Roydon Common is a 194.9-hectare (482-acre) biological Site of Special Scientific Interest east of King's Lynn in Norfolk, England. It is also a Grade I Nature Conservation Review site, a National Nature Reserve and a Ramsar site. It is part of the Roydon Common and Dersingham Bog Special Area of Conservation and Roydon Common and Grimston Warren nature reserve, which is managed by the Norfolk Wildlife Trust,

Designations

Ramsar Wetland
- Official name: Roydon Common
- Designated: 5 March 1993
- Reference no.: 588

== Ecology ==
The common is described by Natural England as "one of the best examples in Britain of a lowland mixed valley mire". It has diverse habitats, including wet acid heath, calcareous fen and dry heath on acid sands. There are rare plants, birds and insects, including the black darter dragonfly.

Uncommon plant species include black bogrush, marsh fern, cranberry, bog asphodel, common cotton-grass, all three species of sundew and sphagnum moss. The common also supports some uncommon dragonfly species such as the broad-bodied chaser. Many species of flowers grow in grassy clearings on the drier ground, which attract butterflies such as green and purple hairstreaks and brown argus.

== Access ==
There is access by footpaths including one from Pott Row which runs along the southern boundary.
