= Cockshoot Broad =

Nature reserve in Norfolk, England

Coordinates: 52.695°N 1.466°E

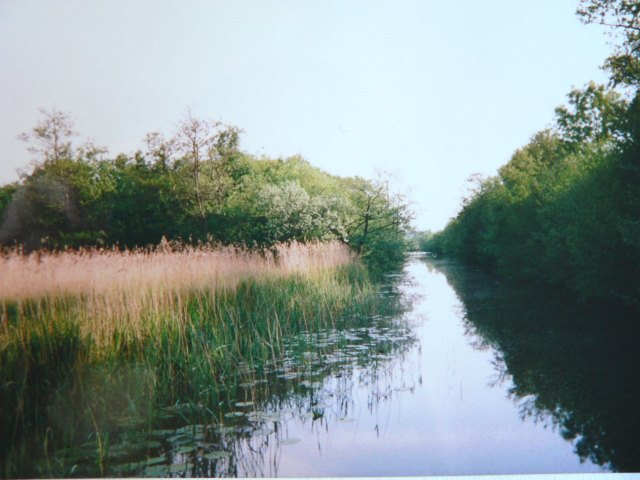
- Interactive map of Cockshoot Broad
- Type: Nature reserve
- Location: Norwich, Norfolk
- OS grid: TG 343 165
- Area: 5 hectares (12 acres)
- Manager: Norfolk Wildlife Trust

Cockshoot Broad is a 5-hectare (12-acre) nature reserve north-east of Norwich in Norfolk. It is managed by the Norfolk Wildlife Trust. It is part of the Bure Broads and Marshes Site of Special Scientific Interest, and the Broadland Ramsar site and Special Protection Area, and The Broads Special Area of Conservation. It is also part of the Bure Marshes National Nature Reserve and Nature Conservation Review site, Grade I.

The water quality of this broad is very high and it has large beds of water lilies, which provide a habitat for many insects, including red eyed and variable damselflies.

Access to the boardwalk through the site is by boat only.
