= Upton Broad and Marshes =

UK Site of Special Scientific Interest

Coordinates: 52.668°N 1.536°E

- Site of Special Scientific Interest
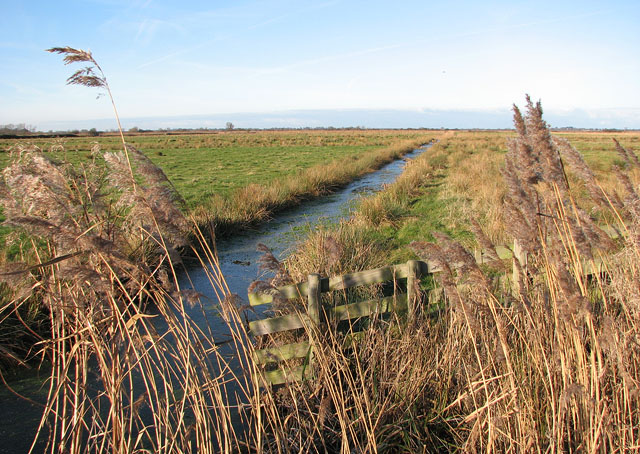
- Upton Marshes
- Location of Upton Broad and Marshes.
- Area of search: Norfolk
- Grid reference: TG 392 137
- Interest: Biological
- Area: 195.4 hectares (483 acres)
- Notification date: 1986
- Location map: Magic Map

Upton Broad and Marshes is a 195.4-hectare (483-acre) biological Site of Special Scientific Interest east of Norwich in Norfolk, England. It is a Nature Conservation Review site, Grade I and a larger area of 318-hectare (790-acre) is managed by the Norfolk Wildlife Trust. It is part of the Broadland Ramsar site and Special Protection Area, and The Broads Special Area of Conservation.

This is described by Natural England as "an outstanding example of unreclaimed wetland and grazing marsh". Its rich invertebrate fauna includes eighteen species of freshwater snail, and an outstanding variety of dragonflies and damselflies, including the nationally rare Norfolk hawker.

The site is open to the public.
