= East Wretham Heath =

UK Site of Special Scientific Interest

Coordinates: 52.458°N 0.808°E

- Site of Special Scientific Interest
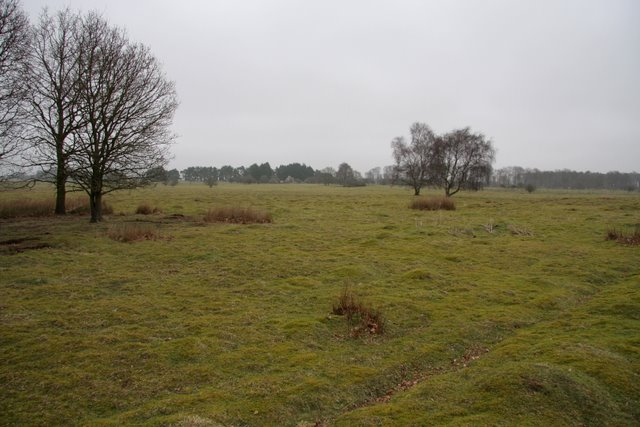
- Location of East Wretham Heath.
- Area of search: Norfolk
- Grid reference: TL 909 882
- Interest: Biological
- Area: 141.1 hectares (349 acres)
- Notification date: 1984
- Location map: Magic Map

East Wretham Heath is a 141.1-hectare (349-acre) biological Site of Special Scientific Interest south-east of Thetford in Norfolk, England. It is a Nature Conservation Review site, Grade I, and it is managed by the Norfolk Wildlife Trust. it is part of the Breckland Special Area of Conservation and Special Protection Area.

The principal ecological interest of this site lies in areas of Breckland grassland and two meres, which are supplied by ground water, and fluctuate irregularly. These conditions have led to unusual plants communities which are tolerant of alternate wetting and drying, such as reed canary grass and amphibious bistort.

There is public access to the reserve.

Part of the land within East Wretham Heath SSSI is owned by the Ministry of Defence.
