= Beetley and Hoe Meadows =

Site of Special Scientific Interest in Norfolk, UK

Coordinates: 52.715°N 0.930°E

- Site of Special Scientific Interest
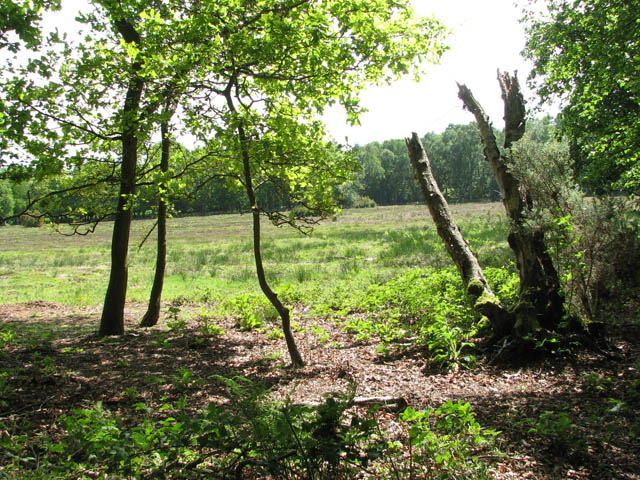
- Location of Beetley and Hoe Meadows.
- Area of search: Norfolk
- Grid reference: TF 980 171
- Interest: Biological
- Area: 11.4 hectares (28 acres)
- Notification date: 1985
- Location map: Magic Map

Beetley and Hoe Meadows is an 11.4-hectare (28-acre) biological Site of Special Scientific Interest north of Dereham in Norfolk, United Kingdom. The site is in two nearby areas, and Hoe Meadow is part of Hoe Rough nature reserve, which is managed by the Norfolk Wildlife Trust

This site is described by Natural England as "one of the finest remaining areas of wet unimproved grassland in Norfolk". It is traditionally managed by summer grazing, with plants such as glaucous Sedge and bog pimpernel in marshy parts and blunt-flowered rush and carnation sedge in permanently wet areas.

Hoe Rough is open to the public.
