= Weeting Heath =

Nature reserve in Norfolk, England

Coordinates: 52.465°N 0.586°E

- Site of Special Scientific Interest
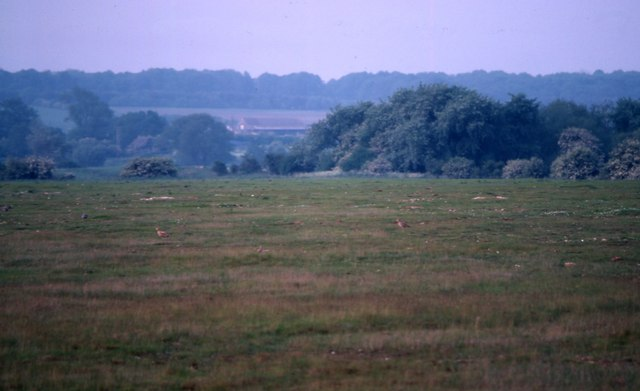
- Location of Weeting Heath.
- Area of search: Norfolk
- Grid reference: TL 758 884
- Interest: Biological
- Area: 141.8 hectares (350 acres)
- Notification date: 1987
- Location map: Magic Map

Weeting Heath is a 141.8-hectare (350-acre) biological Site of Special Scientific Interest west of Thetford in Norfolk, England, which is managed by the Norfolk Wildlife Trust. It is a Nature Conservation Review site, Grade I, and a National Nature Reserve. It is also part of the Breckland Special Area of Conservation and Special Protection Area.

The grass and lichen heath is grazed by rabbits. It has a high density of breeding birds, including stone-curlews. One arable field is reserved for uncommon Breckland plants.

The site is open at limited times.
