= Ranworth Broad =

Wetland in Norfolk, England

Coordinates: 52.682°N 1.487°E

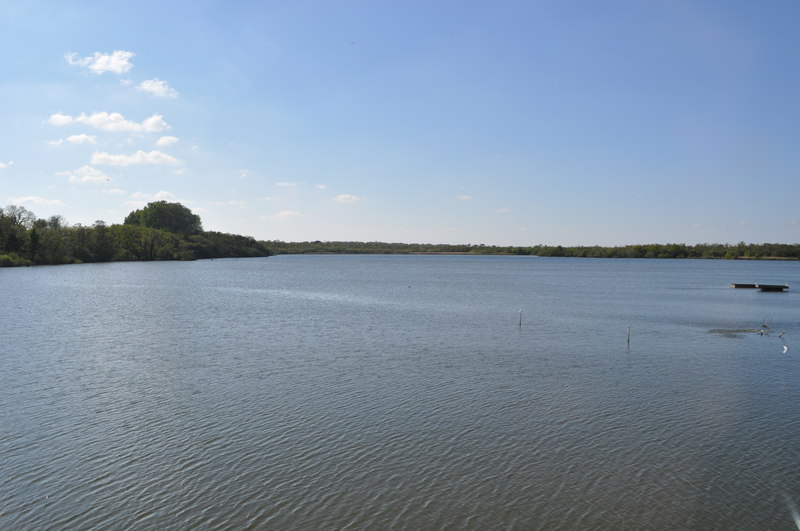
- Interactive map of Ranworth Broad
- Type: Nature reserve
- Location: North-east, Norfolk
- OS grid: TG 358151
- Area: 136 hectares (340 acres)
- Manager: Norfolk Wildlife Trust

Ranworth Broad is a 136-hectare (340-acre) nature reserve on the Norfolk Broads north-east of Norwich in Norfolk, United Kingdom. It is managed by the Norfolk Wildlife Trust. it is part of Bure Broads and Marshes Site of Special Scientific Interest and Bure Marshes Nature Conservation Review site, Grade I and National Nature Reserve. It is also part of the Broadland Ramsar site and Special Protection Area, and The Broads Special Area of Conservation.

Many species of birds can be seen from the floating Broads Wildlife Centre such as great crested grebes, wigeons, gadwalls, kingfishers and cormorants. There are also areas of woodland and reedbeds.

The poet and critic Edward Thomas spent a holiday on a houseboat on Ranworth Broad with his son and a group of friends in the summer of 1913 at the invitation of the poet and writer Eleanor Farjeon, while Thomas's wife Helen was in Switzerland.
