= Sydney Herbert Long =

British physician, naturalist, conservationist

- Born: March 4, 1870; Wells, Norfolk
- Died: January 15, 1939 (aged 68); Norwich, Norfolk
- Education: Epsom College; Caius College, Cambridge; University College Hospital
- Occupations: Physician, naturalist, conservationist
- Known for: Founding the Norfolk Wildlife Trust in 1926

Dr Sydney Herbert Long (4 March 1870 – 15 January 1939) was a British physician, naturalist, conservationist, and founder of the Norfolk Wildlife Trust.

== Early life and medical career ==
Sydney Herbert Long was born in Wells, Norfolk, the son of Dr. Frederick Long. He was educated at Epsom College, Caius College, Cambridge, and University College Hospital, London.

Long settled in Norwich, where he practiced for 40 years, becoming one of the county's leading physicians. He worked at both the Norfolk and Norwich Hospital and the Jenny Lind Hospital.

In 1906, Long married Grace Violet Christie, with whom he had a daughter.

== Naturalist ==
Long was a passionate naturalist. He was secretary of the Norfolk and Norwich Natural History Society for 24 years, retiring in 1936 and becoming president in 1937. His primary interest was the protection of Norfolk's birds, and in 1926 he founded the Norfolk Naturalists Trust (now the Norfolk Wildlife Trust). This was the first county Naturalists Trust and, like the National Trust, was intended to purchase sites of interest in Norfolk to preserve and protect them. Through this, marshes including those at Cley, Salthouse and Martham, and Alderfen Broad, were saved.

Long acted as honorary secretary and treasurer of the Trust, managing these sites and others including at Blakeney and Scolt Head. Long also produced an annual report for the Norfolk and Norwich Natural History Society on the protection of wild birds in the county.

== Death and legacy ==
Memorial stone to Sydney Long, Wretham

Sydney Herbert Long died at home in Norwich on 15 January 1939. In an obituary for Long, The Norfolk and Norwich Naturalists' Society wrote:

He helped more than anyone else to ensure that Norfolk should have much to show for her store of wild life, and that what was seen should be ably and vividly recorded.

Today, The Sydney Long Memorial Medal is given "for an outstanding contribution to the county's natural history". A stone memorial to Long is situated on Wretham Heath, near Langmere, on the Hereward Way. A commemorative plaque at 31 Surrey Street in Norwich marks Long's home of 24 years.
