= Potter and Scarning Fens, East Dereham =

Site of special scientific interest in Norfolk, England

Coordinates: 52.669°N 0.930°E

- Site of Special Scientific Interest
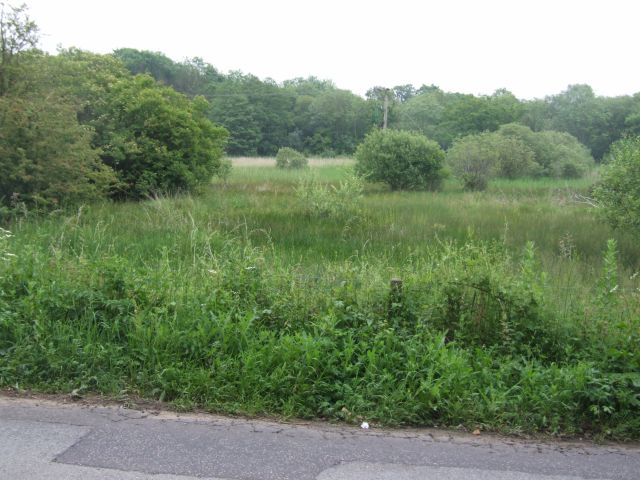
- Scarning Fen
- Location of Potter and Scarning Fens, East Dereham.
- Area of search: Norfolk
- Grid reference: TF 982 120
- Interest: Biological
- Area: 6.2 hectares (15 acres)
- Notification date: 1984
- Location map: Magic Map

Potter and Scarning Fens, East Dereham is a 6.2-hectare (15-acre) biological Site of Special Scientific Interest south of Dereham in Norfolk, England. It is part of the Norfolk Valley Fens Special Area of Conservation. Scarning Fen is a Nature Conservation Review site, Grade I, and it is managed by the Norfolk Wildlife Trust.

These are valleys with calcareous fens on peat with an exceptionally diverse flora, including uncommon mosses and liverworts. Insects include the nationally rare small red damselfly.

The fens are open to the public.
