= Pigneys Wood =

Nature reserve in Norfolk, England

Coordinates: 52.837°N 1.404°E

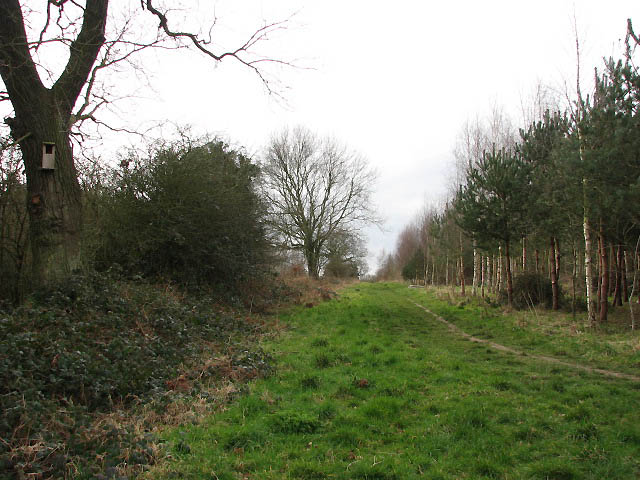
- Interactive map of Pigneys Wood
- Type: Local Nature Reserve
- Location: Knapton, Norfolk
- OS grid: TG 294 320
- Area: 20.9 hectares (52 acres)
- Manager: Norfolk Wildlife Trust

Pigneys Wood or Pigney's Wood is a 20.9-hectare (52-acre) Local Nature Reserve north of North Walsham in Norfolk, England. It was formerly owned by the North Norfolk Community Woodland Trust and is now owned and managed by the Norfolk Wildlife Trust.

This wood has 40 different species of trees, most of which have been planted since 1993, but there is a 450 year old oak. There is also a range of birds, butterflies and dragonflies. Mammals include otters, water voles and badgers.

There is public access to the reserve.
