= Hethel Old Thorn =

Nature reserve in Norfolk, England

Coordinates: 52.559°N 1.201°E

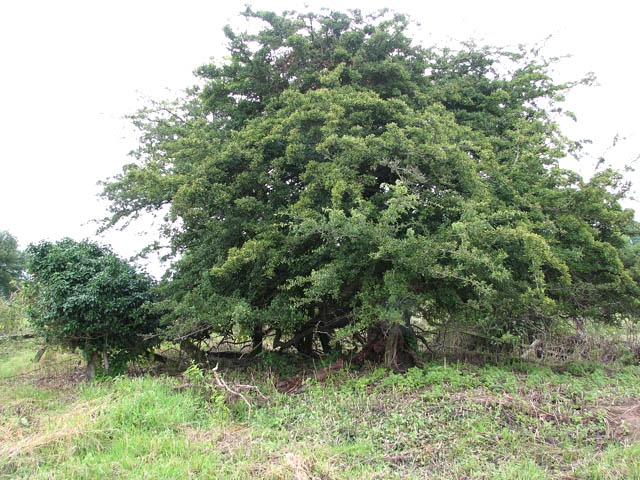
- Interactive map of Hethel Old Thorn
- Type: Nature reserve
- Location: Norwich, Norfolk
- OS grid: TG 171 005
- Area: 0.025 hectares (0.062 acres)
- Manager: Norfolk Wildlife Trust

Hethel Old Thorn is a 0.025-hectare (0.062-acre) nature reserve south-west of Norwich in Norfolk. It is managed by the Norfolk Wildlife Trust.

This is the smallest wildlife trust nature reserve in Britain, consisting of one ancient hawthorn tree, which may date to the thirteenth century. In 1755 its girth was recorded as 9 feet 1 inch, and it has now decayed to a much smaller size, but it is still healthy.

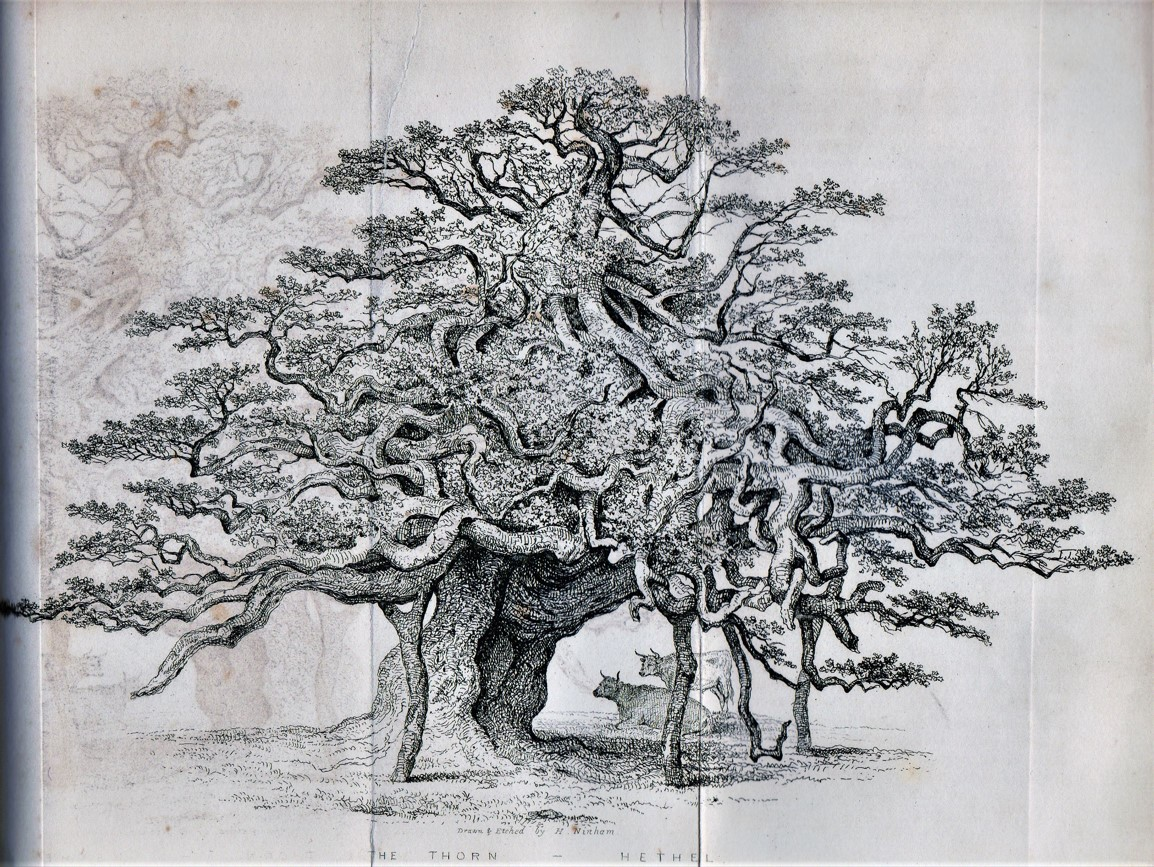
The Thorn - Hethel, drawn and etched by Henry Ninham, from James Grigor's The Eastern Arboretum (1841)
