= Tattersett =

Village in Norfolk, England

Coordinates: 52.83477°N 0.73864°E

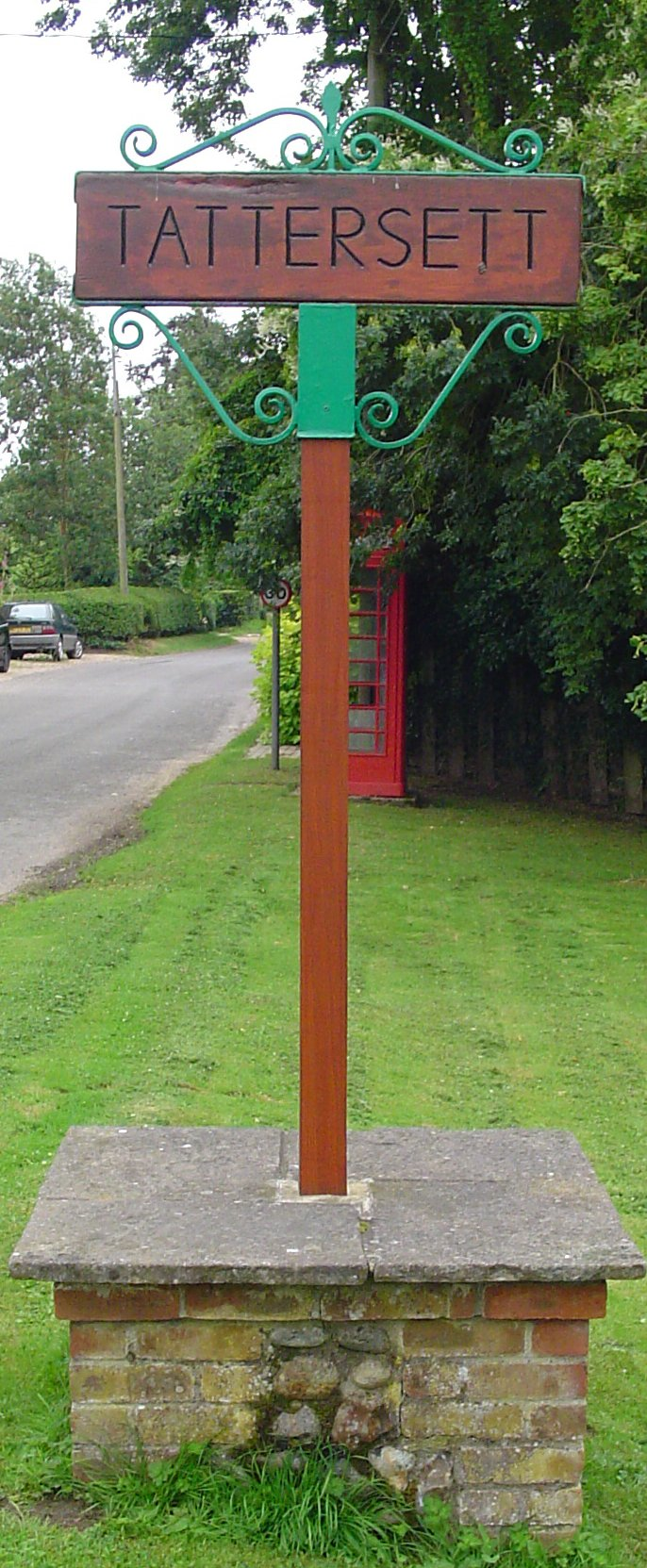
- Tattersett village sign

- Location within Norfolk
- Area: 11.38 km^{2} (4.39 sq mi)
- Population: 962 (2011)
  - Density: 85/km^{2} (220/sq mi)
- OS grid reference: TF845298
- Civil parish: Tattersett
- District: North Norfolk
- Shire county: Norfolk
- Region: East
- Country: England
- Sovereign state: United Kingdom
- Post town: KING'S LYNN
- Postcode district: PE31
- Dialling code: 01485
- Police: Norfolk
- Fire: Norfolk
- Ambulance: East of England

Tattersett is a village and civil parish in the English county of Norfolk. It covers an area of 11.38 square kilometres (4.39 square miles), and had a population of 902 in 390 households at the 2001 census, the population increasing to 962 at the 2011 Census. For the purposes of local government, it falls within the district of North Norfolk.

The village is on the north side of the A148 King's Lynn to Cromer road. The River Tat, a tributary of the River Wensum, rises close to the village.

== Origins ==
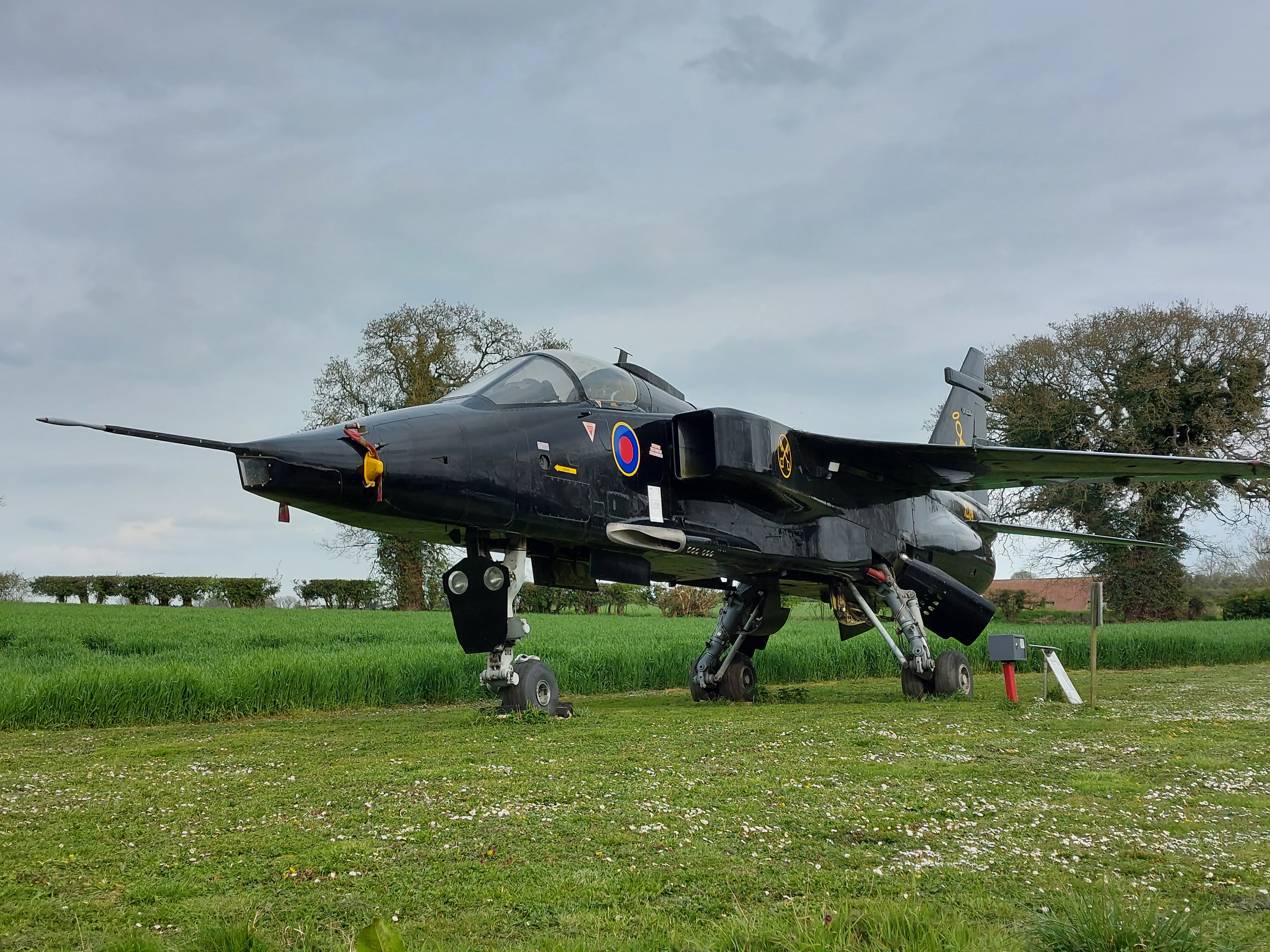
An unusual attraction in Tattersett, a former Royal Air Force SEPECAT Jaguar GR3 XZ394 on display in a farmers field.

The Tattersett name derives from the old English name of Tatessete, which means 'Tathere's dwelling'. The village is mentioned in the Domesday Book of 1086 as a village called Tatessete in the ancient hundred of Brothercross, and is said to be the land of William de Warenne, 1st Earl of Surrey.

The boundaries of the hundreds of Norfolk at the time of the Domesday survey remained largely unchanged, and were anciently divided into leets, of which no trace remains. Yet it may be possible to determine the leets of Brothercross, and specifically the leet that Tattersett parish was within. At the time of Domesday, the parishes of the hundreds of Brothercross and Gallow "were strangely intermixed". When Tattersett parish was transferred to Gallow hundred (well before 1638), all the parishes that used the same prior lete court were likely included. Since the end of the 19th century, Gallow hundred has been superseded by other administrative units of government.

The village sign of Tattersett is in the middle of the village green, opposite Mallard Cottages.
