= Lolly Moor =

Nature reserve in Norfolk, England

Coordinates: 52.654°N 0.944°E

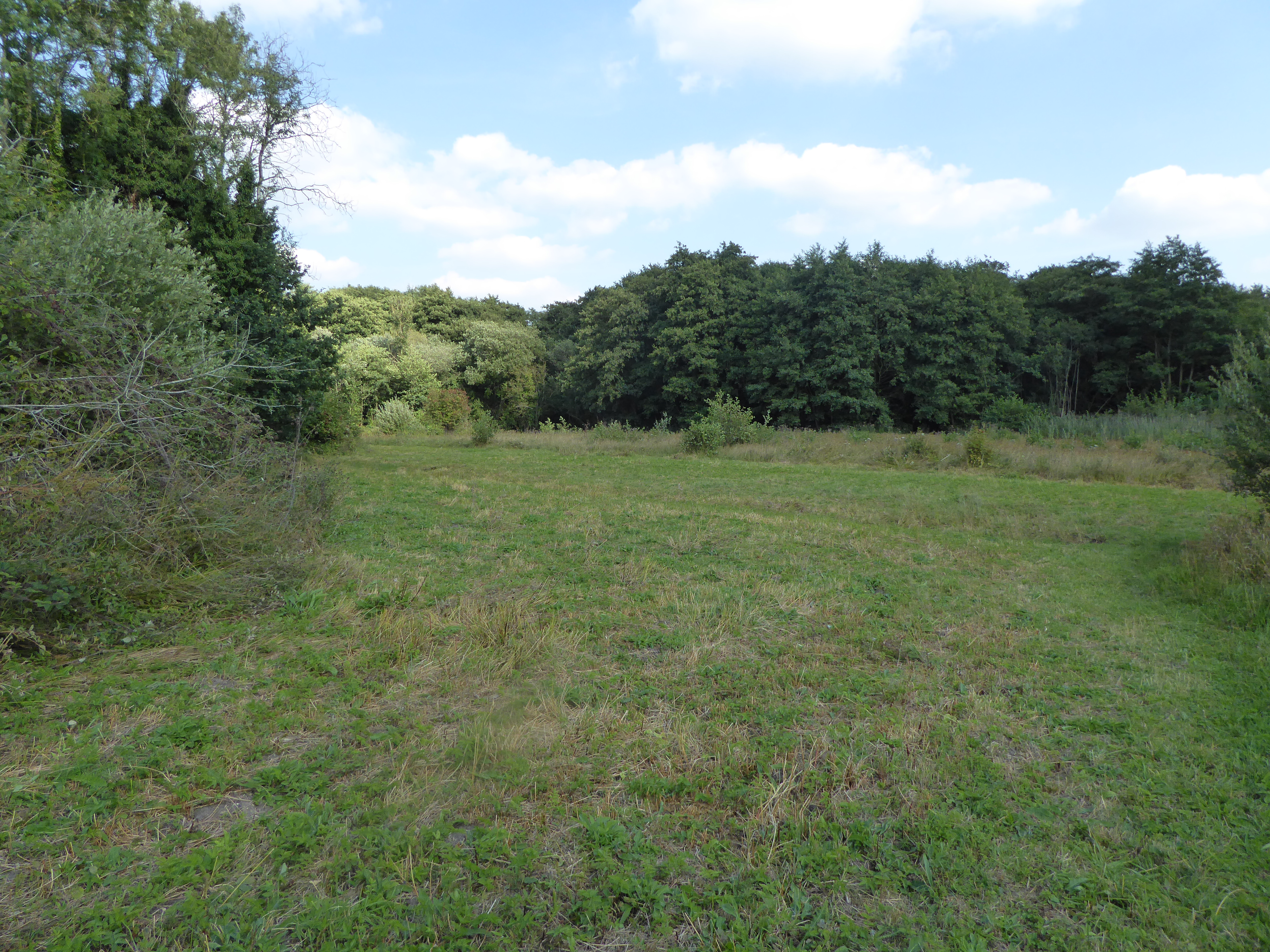
- Interactive map of Lolly Moor
- Type: Nature reserve
- Location: Dereham, Norfolk
- OS grid: TF 992 103
- Area: 3 hectares (7.4 acres)
- Manager: Norfolk Wildlife Trust

Lolly Moor is a 3-hectare (7.4-acre) nature reserve south of Dereham in Norfolk. It is managed by the Norfolk Wildlife Trust.

This site has wet grassland, scrub and alder carr. Flora include cowslip, lesser celandine, southern marsh orchid, marsh helleborine and twayblade.

There is access from Dereham Road.
