= Lower Wood, Ashwellthorpe =

UK Site of Special Scientific Interest

Coordinates: 52.538°N 1.153°E

- Site of Special Scientific Interest
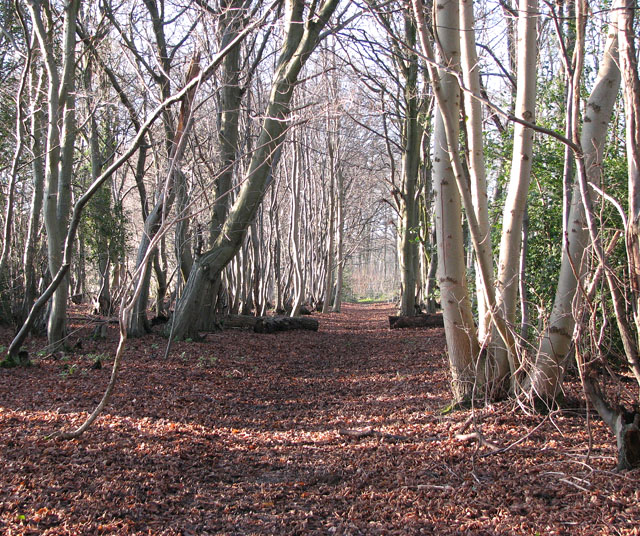
- Location of Lower Wood, Ashwellthorpe.
- Area of search: Norfolk
- Grid reference: TM 139 980
- Interest: Biological
- Area: 37.9 hectares (94 acres)
- Notification date: 1983
- Location map: Magic Map

Lower Wood, Ashwellthorpe is a 37.9-hectare (94-acre) biological Site of Special Scientific Interest south-east of Wymondham in Norfolk, England. It is managed by the Norfolk Wildlife Trust.

This ancient wood on chalky boulder clay has a diverse ground flora with uncommon species such as wood spurge, early-purple orchid, common twayblade, ramsons, water avens and woodruff.

The wood is open to the public.
