= Hoe Rough =

Nature reserve in Norfolk, England

Coordinates: 52.713°N 0.927°E

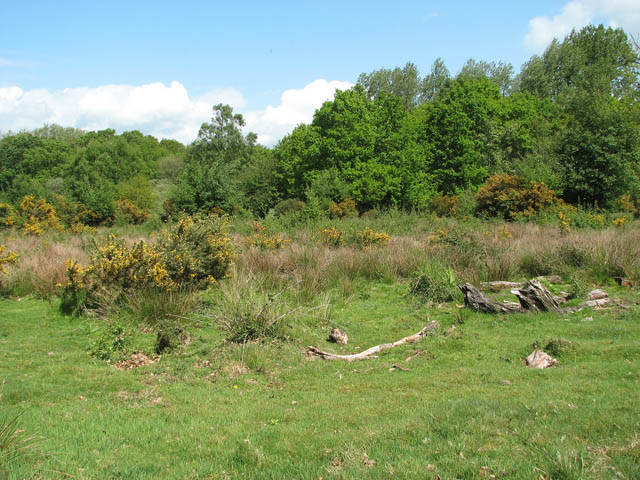
- Interactive map of Hoe Rough
- Type: Nature reserve
- Location: Dereham, Norfolk
- OS grid: TF 978 168
- Area: 12 hectares (30 acres)
- Manager: Norfolk Wildlife Trust

Hoe Rough is a 12-hectare (30-acre) nature reserve north of Dereham in Norfolk. It is managed by the Norfolk Wildlife Trust, and is part of the Beetley and Hoe Meadows Site of Special Scientific Interest.

This is mixture of grassland and wet fen. Around 200 species of invertebrates have been recorded, as well as the rare great crested newt. Notable plants include green-winged and early marsh orchids.

There is public access to the site.
