= Thursford Wood =

Nature reserve in Norfolk, England

Coordinates: 52.861°N 0.938°E

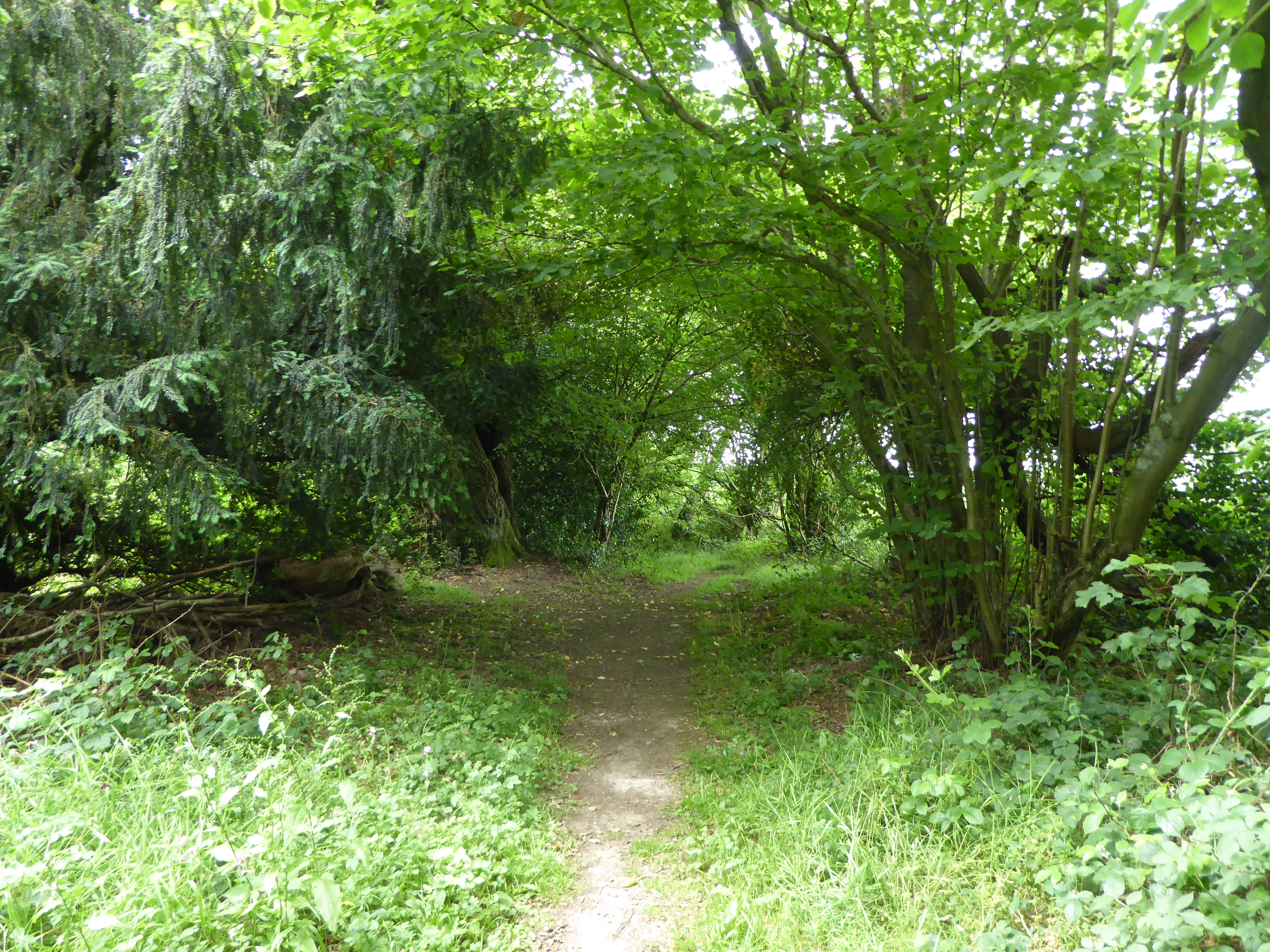
- Interactive map of Thursford Wood
- Type: Nature reserve
- Location: Fakenham, Norfolk
- OS grid: TF 979 333
- Area: 10 hectares (25 acres)
- Manager: Norfolk Wildlife Trust

Thursford Wood is a 10-hectare (25-acre) nature reserve north-east of Fakenham in Norfolk. It is managed by the Norfolk Wildlife Trust.

The oak trees in this wood are some of the oldest in the county, and some may be over 500 years old. The site also has a variety of woodland birds, as well as many ferns and fungi.

The site is open to the public.
