= East Winch Common =

UK Site of Special Scientific Interest

Coordinates: 52.713°N 0.515°E

- Site of Special Scientific Interest
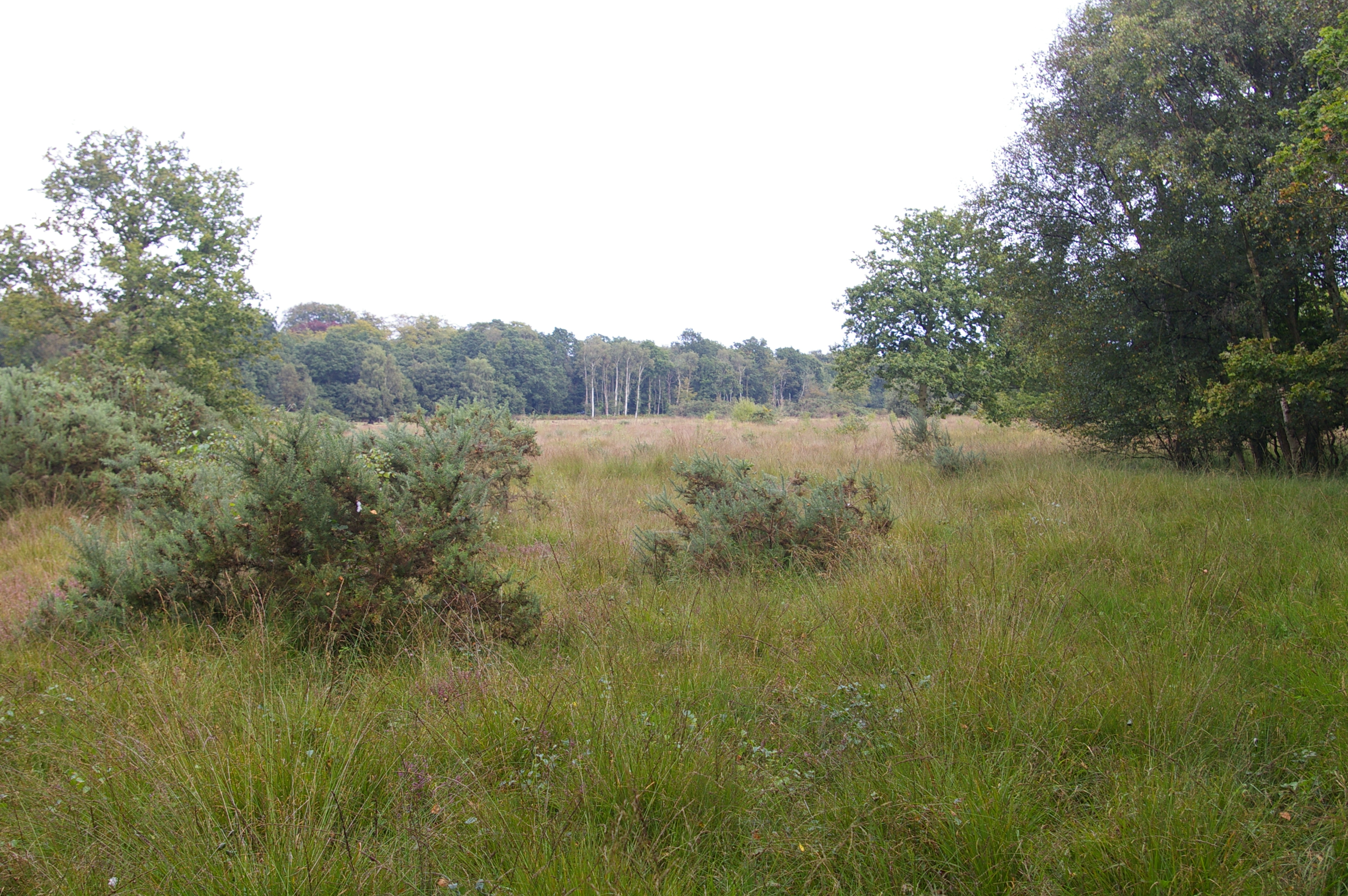
- Location of East Winch Common.
- Area of search: Norfolk
- Grid reference: TF 700 158
- Interest: Biological
- Area: 26.1 hectares (64 acres)
- Notification date: 1984
- Location map: Magic Map

East Winch Common is a 26.1-hectare (64-acre) biological Site of Special Scientific Interest south-east of King's Lynn in Norfolk, England. It is common land and is managed by the Norfolk Wildlife Trust.

This site is mainly wet acid heath on peat, and it is dominated by heather and cross-leaved heath. There are many wet hollows, which have diverse fen and mire flora, and areas of young woodland.

The reserve is open to the public.
