= Syderstone Common =

Conservation area in Norfolk, England

Coordinates: 52.852°N 0.716°E

- Site of Special Scientific Interest
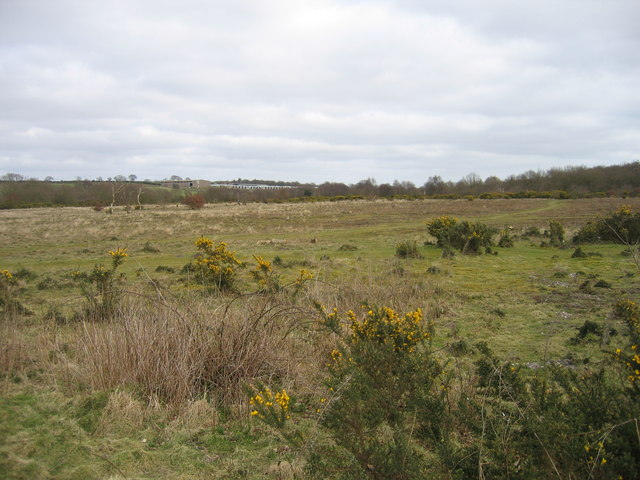
- Location of Syderstone Common.
- Area of search: Norfolk
- Grid reference: TF 830 317
- Interest: Biological
- Area: 43.7 hectares (108 acres)
- Notification date: 1984
- Location map: Magic Map

Syderstone Common is a 43.7-hectare (108-acre) biological Site of Special Scientific Interest west of Fakenham in Norfolk, England. An area of 24-hectare (59-acre) is managed by the Norfolk Wildlife Trust.

The common has heath and grassland areas in the valley of the River Tat. Pools on sand and gravel provide suitable habitats for five species of breeding amphibians, including the nationally rare natterjack toad.

The site is open to the public.
