= Cley Marshes =

Nature reserve on the North Sea coast of England

NWT Cley Marshes
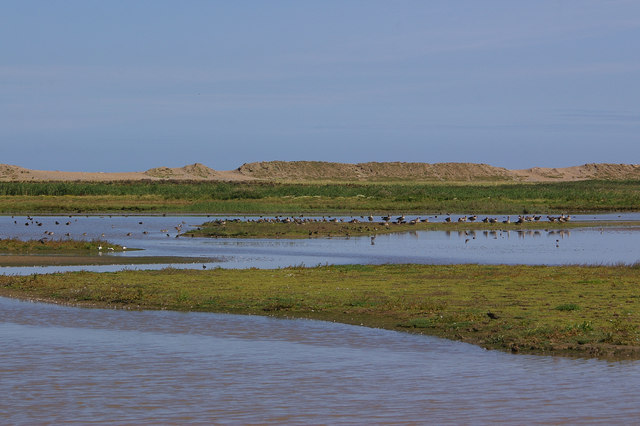
- Looking north across the reserve

- Location within Norfolk
- Location: Norfolk, East of England, England
- Coordinates: 52.959°N 1.056°E
- Established: 1926
- Website: www.norfolkwildlifetrust.org.uk/cley

Cley Marshes is a 176-hectare (430-acre) nature reserve on the North Sea coast of England just outside the village of Cley next the Sea, Norfolk. A reserve since 1926, it is the oldest of the reserves belonging to the Norfolk Wildlife Trust (NWT), which is itself the oldest county Wildlife Trust in the United Kingdom. Cley Marshes protects an area of reed beds, freshwater marsh, pools and wet meadows and is part of the North Norfolk Coast Site of Special Scientific Interest (SSSI), Special Area of Conservation (SAC), Special Protection Area (SPA), and Ramsar Site due to the large numbers of birds it attracts.

The reserve is important for some scarce breeding species, such as pied avocets on the islands, and western marsh harriers, Eurasian bitterns and bearded reedlings in the reeds, and is also a major migration stopoff and wintering site. There are also several nationally or locally scarce invertebrates and plants specialised for this coastal habitat. It has five bird hides and an environmentally friendly visitor centre and further expansion is planned through the acquisition of neighbouring land and improvements to visitor facilities.

The site has a long history of human occupation, from prehistoric farming to its use as a prisoner of war camp in the Second World War. The reserve attracts large numbers of visitors, contributing significantly to the economy of Cley village. Despite centuries of embankment to reclaim land and protect the village, the marshes have been flooded many times, and the southward march of the coastal shingle bank and encroachment by the sea make it inevitable that the reserve will eventually be lost. New wetlands are being created further inland to compensate for the loss of coastal habitats.

== History ==
=== Prehistory to 1926 ===
Norfolk has a long history of human occupation. Both modern humans and Neanderthals were present in the area before the last glaciation between 100,000 and 10,000 years ago, and humans returned as the ice retreated northwards. The archaeological record is poor until about 20,000 years ago, partly because of the prevailing conditions, but also because the coastline was much further north than at present. As the ice retreated during the Mesolithic, the sea level rose, filling what is now the North Sea. This brought the Norfolk coastline much closer to its present line, so that many ancient sites are now under the sea. The oldest signs of habitation on the marshes are prehistoric Clactonian flint blades possibly from 400,000 years ago, but few other prehistoric remains have been recorded here.

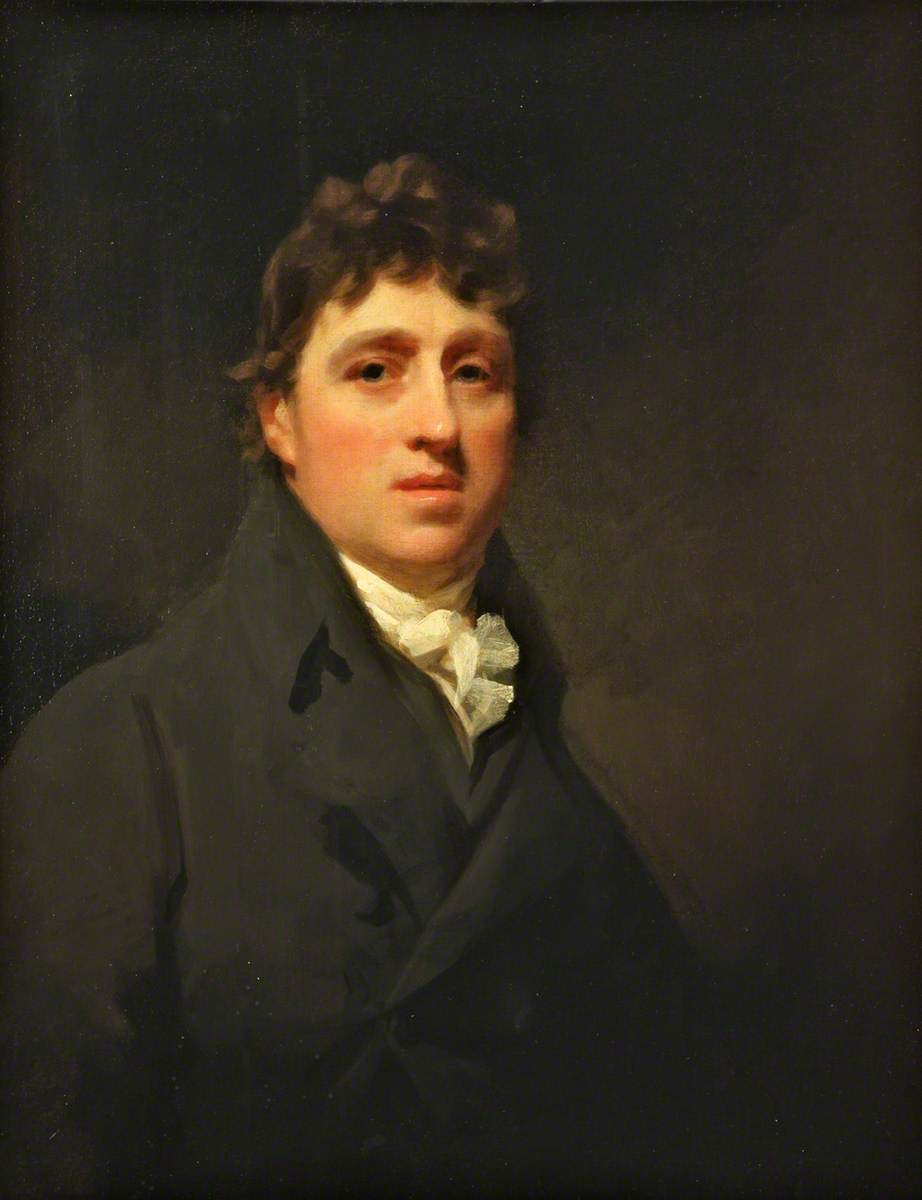
Thomas Telford's recommendations for keeping the access to Cley port open were not implemented.

Fragments of a Roman vase and jug have been found on the beach. A 1797 map showed what was described as the ruins of "Cley Chapel", although it is more likely that they belonged to a barn. A 1588 map showed "Black Joy Forte", which may have been intended as a defence against the Spanish Armada. There are a number of post-medieval earthworks, presumably sea defences, and pits which may have been associated with salt-making.

Until the mid-1600s, much of the area now known as Cley Marshes was part of a vast tidal marsh and was covered by seawater twice a day. The shoreline itself was hundreds of metres north of its present location. The raised area in the north-west corner, called the "Eye", has been farmed since the earliest human habitation. It was 28 ha (70 acres) in extent in 1651, but is now much reduced by coastal erosion. Access to the Eye was by an ancient causeway, passable at low tide. John Heydon started the process of embanking the marshes to reclaim the land in 1522, and his banks were extended and improved by Dutchman Jan van Hasedunch from 1630. Simon Britiff, Lord of the local Manor of Cley, completed the scheme by building the bank on the east side of the Cley channel. Only the east and west banks have survived; the north bank was breached by the sea in 1897, then rebuilt with a concrete facing, but abandoned after another bad storm in 1921.

Cley and nearby Blakeney had been prosperous and important ports in the Middle Ages, but land reclamation schemes, especially those by Henry Calthorpe in 1640 just to the west of Cley, led to the silting up of the shipping channel and relocation of the wharf. Further enclosure in the mid-1820s aggravated the problem, and also allowed the shingle ridge at the beach to block the former tidal channel to the Salthouse marshes to the east of Cley. In an attempt to halt the decline, Thomas Telford was consulted in 1822, but his recommendations for reducing the silting were not implemented, and by 1840 almost all of Cley's trade had been lost to Blakeney and other Norfolk ports. The population stagnated, and the value of all property decreased sharply. In the mid-nineteenth century, the Lord of the manor constructed the present road to the beach in exchange for closing the ancient right of way across the marshes.

In the decades preceding World War I, this stretch of coast became famous for its wildfowling; locals were looking for food, but some "Gentleman Gunners" hunted to collect rare birds. One of the best known of the latter was E. C. Arnold, who collected for more than fifty years, and gave his name to the marsh at the north-east corner of the present reserve.

=== Nature reserve era ===
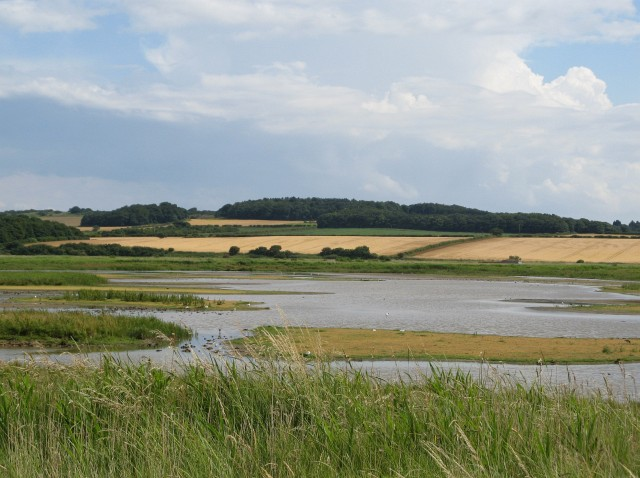
Looking inland across the reserve

Cley Marshes reserve was created in 1926 when Norfolk birdwatcher Dr Sydney Long bought the land which now makes up the reserve for the sum of £5,100, to be held "in perpetuity as a bird breeding sanctuary". Long then established the Norfolk Wildlife Trust.

The reserve was extended in 1962 through the lease of the adjacent 11-hectare (27-acre) Arnold's Marsh from the National Trust; this had long been the primary feeding area for waders, but much of the best habitat had been lost to the advancing shingle ridge. New pools and hides were created on the reserve from 1964, and the sale of permits for access to the hides became a useful source of income for the NWT. Further pools and hides were established during the 1970s, and a visitor centre was built in 1981 on the site of the current building.

Over the long history of the reserve, it has had only three wardens, all from the same family. Robert Bishop was warden from 1926 to 1937, and was followed by his grandson, Billy, from 1937 to 1978. Billy's son, Bernard, who was appointed in 1978, is still managing the reserve.

The reserve now covers 176 hectares (430 acres), and is of international importance for its breeding and wintering birds. It was designated as a Site of Special Scientific Interest (SSSI) in 1954, and in 1986 it was subsumed into the 7,700-hectare (19,000-acre) North Norfolk Coast SSSI. The larger area is now additionally protected through Natura 2000, Special Protection Area (SPA) and Ramsar listings, and is part of the Norfolk Coast Area of Outstanding Natural Beauty (AONB). The reserve has been referred to as "a Mecca for birdwatchers".

=== Second World War coastal fortifications ===
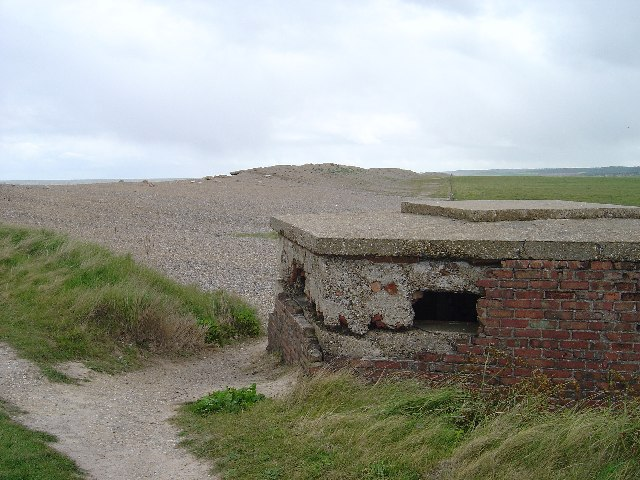
Extant World War II pillbox at end of west bank

During the Second World War, Royal Artillery military fortifications were established at the beach end of the reserve, including two 6-inch (15.24 cm) guns, five buildings, two pillboxes, a minefield, and concrete anti-tank blocks. A spigot mortar emplacement and an Allan Williams Turret machine gun emplacement were sited closer to the village. One of the pillboxes and remains of the beach gun emplacements were still surviving as of 2012.

The military camp held 160 men and was later used to hold prisoners of war. Italian, but not German, prisoners were allowed to attend dances at the anti-aircraft camp at nearby Stiffkey. Near the end of the war, the camp was used to house East European refugees, and it was finally pulled down in 1948. Many of the wartime buildings were destroyed by the Royal Engineers in 1955, but the generator house was taken over by the coastguard service as an observation post. It was acquired by the NWT in 1983, and the upper part was used as a look-out, while the larger lower section became a beach café. The building was overwhelmed by shingle in a storm in 2008 and subsequently demolished.

== Access and facilities ==
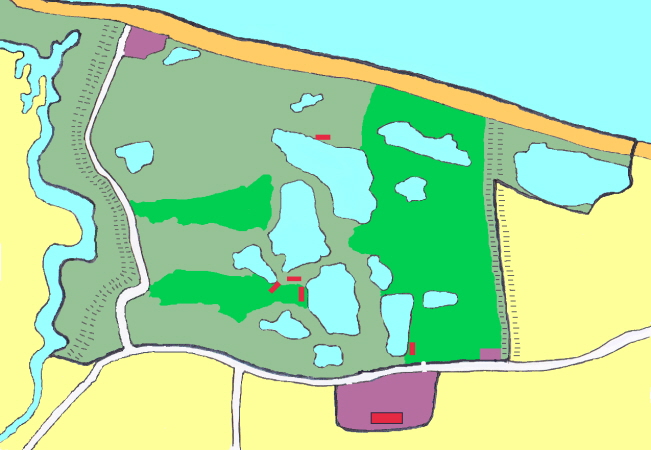
Reed bed Pasture Shingle Car parks Visitor centre and hides

The reserve is to the north of the A149 coast road just east of the village of Cley next the Sea, 6 km (3.7 mi) north of Holt. The visitor centre and car park are to the south of the road, opposite the reserve. The reserve can be reached by public transport using the bus service that stops outside the visitor centre.

The reserve is viewable from the visitor centre, footpaths next to the A149 and down the East Bank, the beach and the road running from the beach back to the main road. It can be accessed by footpaths at three points, each leading to one or more bird hides. Beach Road and the beach itself form part of the Peddars Way long distance footpath.

The present visitor centre, which opened in June 2007, is on a small hill overlooking the reserve. It contains a café and shop, and is open daily. The reserve and hides are open at all times, with free access to NWT members, although non-members must buy a permit.

The visitor centre is built on environmentally friendly principles. Its roof is covered with living sedum plants, rainwater is collected for re-use, and the building's energy profile is reduced using solar water heating, wind turbines and geothermal heat pumps. It has won a number of awards including the Emirates Glass LEAF architectural award for the sustainability category. The success of the centre has led to plans to develop it further, offering more services and educational facilities and enhancing its profitability for the Trust. The centre and four of the five bird hides are accessible to wheelchair users.

In 2012 the NWT launched a public appeal to raise £1 million to purchase 58 hectares (143 acres) of private land immediately to the east of the existing reserve, and adjoining the existing 66 ha (163 acre) Trust reserve at Salthouse Marshes. This purchase would create a unified 8 km (5 mi) stretch of NWT-owned coastal land and expand the Cley reserve by one-third.

== Fauna and flora ==
=== Birds ===
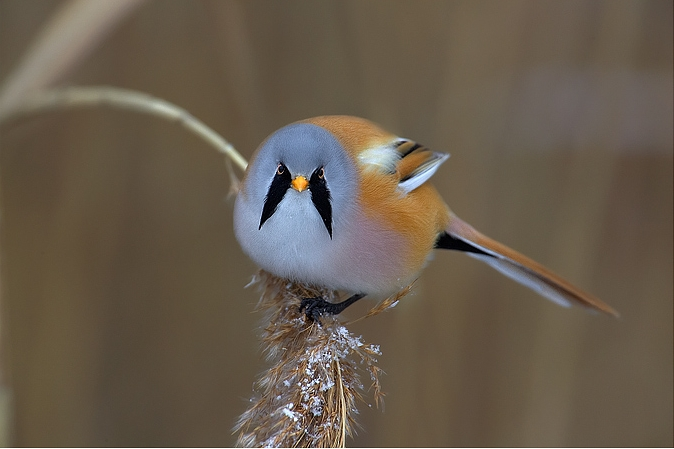
Bearded reedling

The key breeding species are reed bed specialists such as the marsh harrier, Eurasian bittern and bearded reedling, and the island-nesting avocet. Other birds nesting in the wetland include northern lapwing, common redshank and sedge, reed and Cetti's warblers. Eurasian spoonbills, ruffs and black-tailed godwits are present for much of the year, and a pair of little egrets bred for the first time in 2010–2012.

Spring migrants including little gull, black tern, Temminck's stint and garganey may pass through on their way to breed elsewhere, and terns frequently visit from the colonies on Blakeney Point. In the autumn, birds arrive from the north. Some, such as Eurasian whimbrels, curlew sandpipers and little stints, just pausing for a few days to refuel before continuing south, others staying for the winter. Offshore, great and Arctic skuas, northern gannets and black-legged kittiwakes may pass close by in favourable winds. Large numbers of ducks winter on the reserve, including many Eurasian wigeons, Eurasian teals, mallards and gadwalls, goldeneyes and northern pintails. Red-throated divers are usually on the sea, and brent geese feed on sea lettuce and other green algae. Barn owls and sometimes hen harriers quarter the marshes in winter, and snow bunting flocks can be found on the beach.

The reserve's location means that migrants may be found, sometimes in huge numbers when the weather conditions are right. These may include vagrant rarities, including a western sandpiper in 2012, a displaying great snipe in 2011, a trumpeter finch in 2010 and a collared pratincole in 2009. In order to maintain a good habitat, parts of the reed bed are cut and sold for thatch each year to establish a mosaic of plants of different ages.

=== Other animals ===
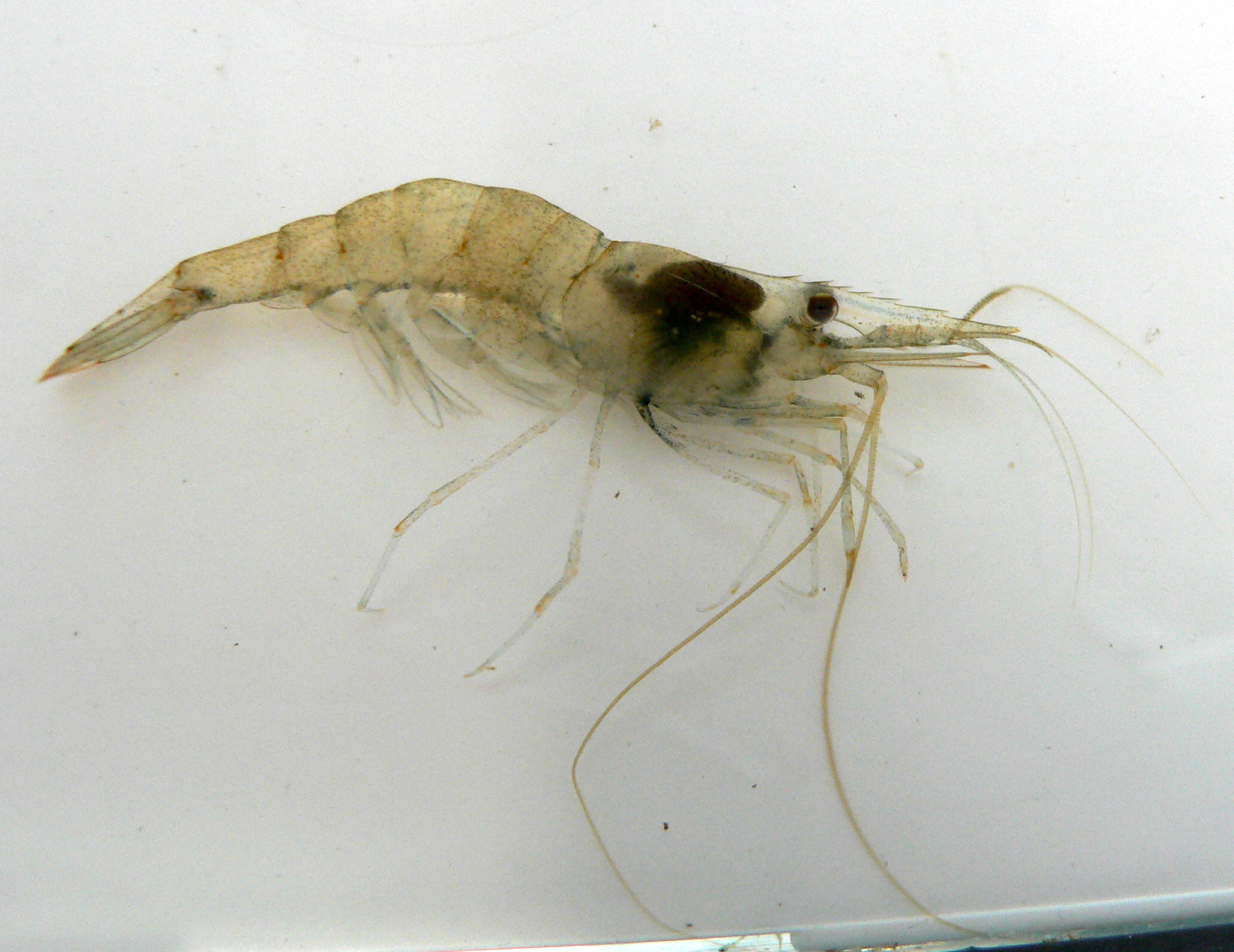
Atlantic ditch shrimp

Water voles are a highly threatened species in the UK, with a huge decline in numbers of 70–90%, mainly due to predation by the introduced American mink, but also habitat loss and water pollution. They are still common at Cley, which is one of a number of East Anglian sites now of national importance for this species. Brown hares are widespread, and European otters may be seen, with spraints regularly found at the southern end of East Bank. The common frog, common toad and common lizard all occur on the reserve.

Arnold's Marsh and the other lagoons nearest the beach are salty due to the percolation of seawater through the shingle bank. These saline lagoons may cover mud, firm sand or submerged vegetation, and hold some rare and threatened invertebrates including starlet sea anemone, lagoon sand shrimp, Atlantic ditch shrimp, the mysid shrimps Paramysis nouveli and Neomysis integer, lagoon cockle, the bug Orthotylus rubidus and spire snail. Little whirlpool ramshorn snail has been found in a freshwater channel. Rare beetles associated with these coastal environments include yellow pogonus, Bembidion ephippium and Tachys scutellaris. These marshes are the only reliable UK site for the Pogonus species, and even here it is localised and hard to find.

=== Plants ===
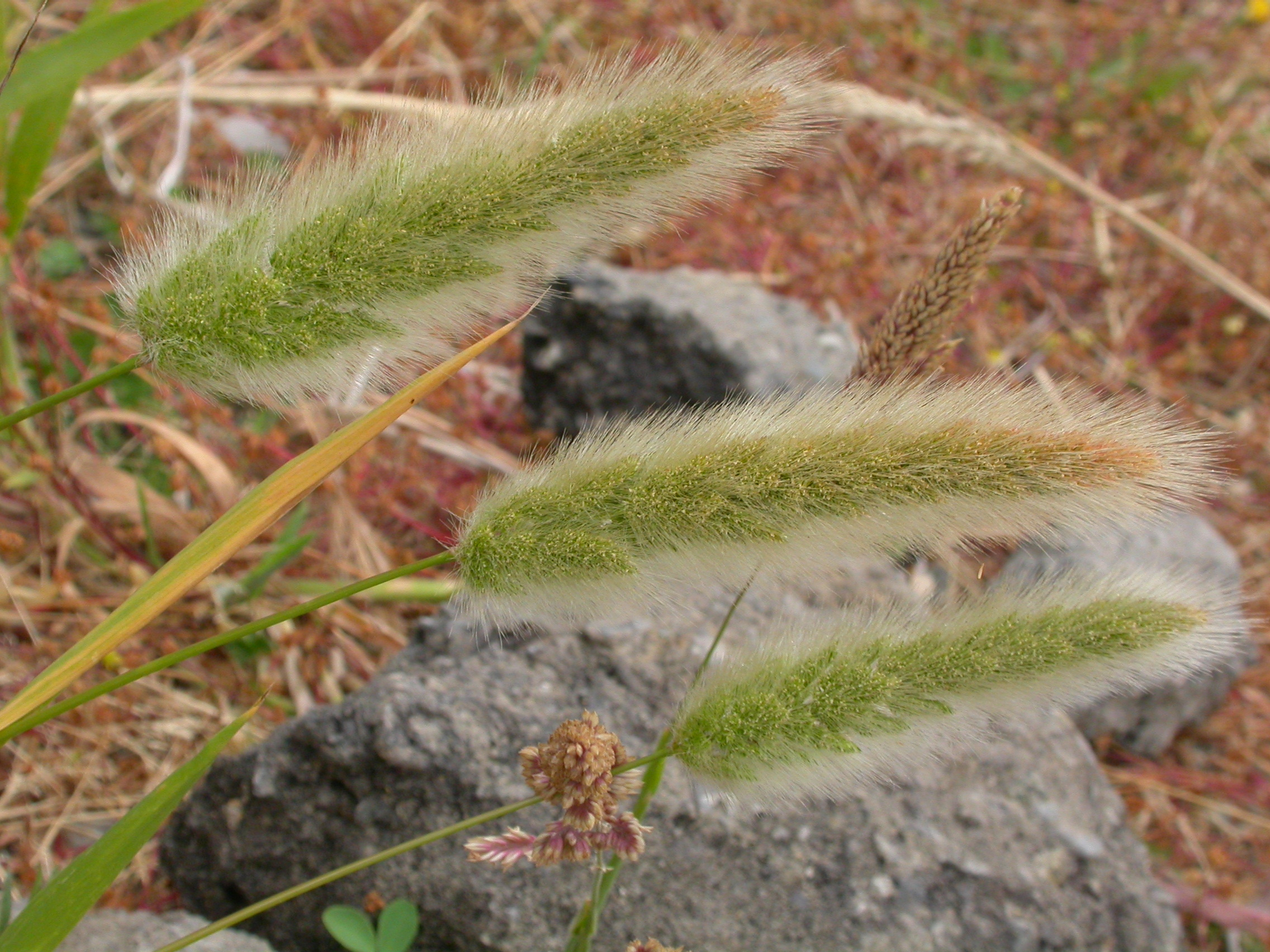
Annual beard grass

The shingle ridge that protects the reserve from the sea and extends to Blakeney Point attracts biting stonecrop, sea campion, yellow horned poppy, sea thrift, bird's foot trefoil and sea beet. Sea barley is a scarcer species of this habitat. In the damper areas, sea wormwood, sea lavender and scrubby sea-blite also thrive. The saltmarsh contains glassworts and common cord grass in the most exposed regions, with a succession of plants following on as the marsh becomes more established: first sea aster, then mainly sea lavender, with sea purslane in the creeks and smaller areas of sea plantain and other common marsh plants. The uncommon spiral tasselweed and long-bracted sedge are other saltmarsh specialists. The upper saltmarsh has a number of scarce species including lesser centaury, curved hard-grass and sea pearlwort, with soft hornwort in the dykes.

The drier areas of the reserve contain maritime grasses such as sea couch grass and sea poa grass. The reedbeds are dominated by common reed with saltmarsh rush, brackish water crowfoot, sea clubrush and common bulrush also common in the various wetland habitats. The coastal pastures at Cley and the adjacent Salthouse Marshes have jointleaf rush, common silverweed and less common grasses such as annual beard grass, marsh foxtail and slender hare's-ear. The site is generally rich in plants, especially those that can cope with saline environments, but three species appear to have been lost: divided sedge was last recorded in 1999, grey hair-grass in 1982 and lax-flowered sea lavender in 1977. Lichens are not suited to the prevailing habitat, but the nationally rare soot lichen occurs on untreated wood. The locally rare Heim's pottia occurs in the saltmarsh, and the coastal variety piliferum of cuspidate earth-moss is found at Salthouse.

== Recreation ==
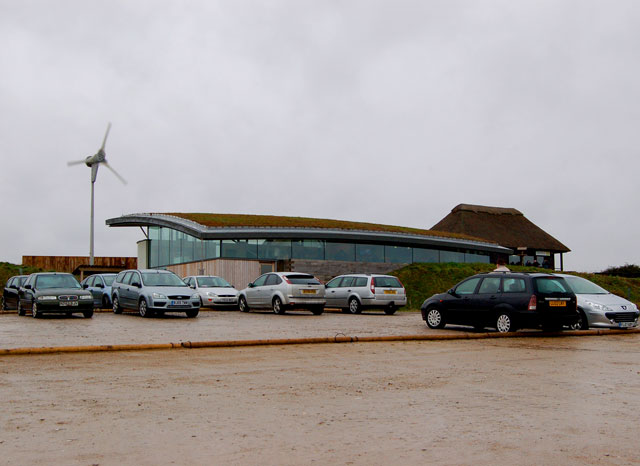
The visitor centre attracts more than 100,000 visitors annually.

A 2005 survey at Cley and five other North Norfolk coastal sites found that 39 per cent of visitors gave birdwatching as the main purpose of their visit. The 7.7 million day visitors and 5.5 million who made overnight stays in the area in 1999 are estimated to have spent £122 million, and created the equivalent of 2,325 full-time jobs. Cley Marshes, like Titchwell Marsh RSPB and Holkham NNR, attracts 100,000 or more visitors annually.

Of the six sites, Cley and Titchwell have the highest proportion of pre-planned visits, and Cley, together with neighbouring Blakeney, had the highest per capita spend per visitor. The equivalent of 52 full-time jobs in the Cley area are estimated to result from the £2.45 million spent by the visiting public.

The large number of tourists can have negative effects; wildlife may be disturbed, particularly species that breed in exposed areas, such as ringed plovers, and plants can be trampled, which is a particular problem in sensitive habitats such as sand dunes and vegetated shingle. Damage can be reduced by measures such as wardening the breeding colonies and using fences, boardwalks and signs to control access. The access paths to the hides, other than the northernmost, are largely boardwalked, and an extensive programme of fence replacement and improvements to the control of water levels on the reserve took place in 2010–2011.

== Threats ==
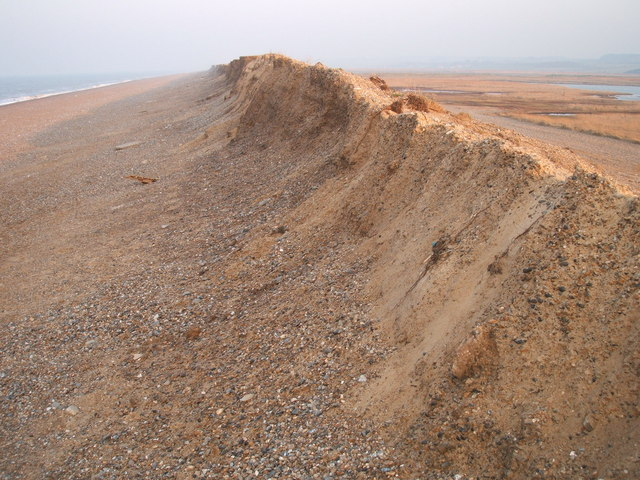
The shingle ridge is moving southwards through the marshes.

The reserve shelters behind a ridge of shingle that runs west from Weybourne along the Norfolk coast, before becoming a spit extending into the sea at Blakeney Point. Saltmarshes can develop behind the shingle, but the sea attacks the ridge and spit through tidal and storm action. The amount of shingle moved by a single storm can be "spectacular"; the spit has sometimes been breached, becoming an island for a time, and this may happen again. The northernmost part of nearby Blakeney was lost to the sea in the early Middle Ages, probably due to a storm.

The spit is moving towards the mainland at about 1 m per year, and for the last two hundred years maps have been accurate enough for the encroachment of the sea to be quantified. Blakeney Chapel, just west of the reserve, was 400 m (440 yd) from the sea in 1817, but this had reduced to 195 m (215 yd) by the end of the twentieth century. The landward movement of the shingle also means that the channel of the River Glaven becomes blocked increasingly often, leading to flooding of the reserve and Cley village. The Environment Agency considered a number of remedial options to protect these vulnerable areas, and a new route for the river to the south of its original line was completed in 2007 at a cost of about £1.5 million.

The sea defences at Cley were badly breached in 1742, 1897, 1953 and 1996, with smaller incursions in 1993 and 1998. The massive 1953 flood reached 8 km (4 mi) inland at Cley. A 2 m (6 ft) storm surge in December 2013 flooded much of the English east coast, and breached the shingle ridge at Cley, flooding the reserve and damaging or destroying the hides. Restoration of the reserve was assisted by Natural England, and the removal of salt was helped by natural freshwater springs. As of 2015, the reserve was fully restored and functioning.

Although the financial benefits from the recreational value of the reserve currently outweigh the costs of maintaining the sea defences, managed retreat is likely to be the long-term solution to rising sea levels at Cley and along much of the rest of the North Norfolk coast, and has already been implemented at other major sites including Titchwell Marsh. The important reedbeds at Cley will inevitably be lost due to increased saltwater flow into the marshes. To compensate, the Environment Agency and the Norfolk Wildlife Trust have been working since 2010 to make a new wetland near Hilgay. The 60-hectare (150-acre) Hilgay Wetland Creation Project is converting former farmland into a variety of wetland habitats by using banks, ditches and a lake to manage water levels. The Trust sees this as the first stage of a long-term plan to create a roughly 10,000-hectare (25,000-acre) Wissey Living Landscape.

== Cited texts ==
- Bishop, Billy (1983). Cley Marsh and its Birds. Woodbridge, Suffolk: Boydell Press. ISBN 0-85115-180-9.
- Brooks, Peter (2011). Cley. Cromer, Norfolk: Poppyland Books. ISBN 978-0-946148-92-9.
- Elkins, Norman (1988). Weather and Bird Behaviour. Waterhouses, Staffordshire: Poyser. ISBN 0-85661-051-8.
- Gray, J M (2004). Geodiversity: valuing and conserving abiotic nature. Edinburgh: Wiley-Blackwell. ISBN 0-470-84896-0.
- Harrup, Simon; Redman, Nigel (2010). Where to watch birds in Britain. London: Christopher Helm. ISBN 978-1-4081-1059-1.
- Labrum, E A (1993). Civil Engineering Heritage: Eastern and Central England (Civil Engineering Heritage Series). London: Thomas Telford. ISBN 0-7277-1970-X.
- Liley, D (2008). Development and the north Norfolk coast. Scoping document on the issues relating to access (PDF). Wareham, Dorset: Footprint Ecology. Archived from the original (PDF) on 6 April 2012.
- May, V J (2003). Geological Conservation Review: volume 28: Coastal geomorphology of Great Britain. Peterborough: Joint Nature Conservation Committee. ISBN 1-86107-484-0.
- Muir, Richard (2008). The lost villages of Britain. Stroud, Gloucestershire: The History Press Ltd. ISBN 978-0-7509-5039-8.
- Net Gain (2011). Submission to Natural England & JNCC: Section 7.20 (Site Assessment Document) rRA 2a & rRA 2b, Seahorse Lagoon & Arnold's Marsh (PDF). Net Gain (The North Sea Marine Conservation Zones Project). Archived from the original (PDF) on 2 May 2012.
- Newton, Ian (2010). Bird Migration: Collins New Naturalist Library (113). London: Collins. ISBN 978-0-00-730732-6.
- Norfolk Wildlife Trust (2005). NWT Cley and Salthouse Marshes Management Plan April 2005–March 2010. Norwich: Norfolk Wildlife Trust.
- Norfolk Wildlife Trust (2011a). Norfolk Wildlife Trust Annual Report 2010/2011. Norwich: Norfolk Wildlife Trust.
- Norfolk Wildlife Trust (2011b). Norfolk Wildlife Trust Business Strategy 2011–16. Norwich: Norfolk Wildlife Trust.
- Pevsner, Nikolaus; Wilson, Bill (2002). The Buildings Of England Norfolk I: Norwich and North-East Norfolk. New Haven and London: Yale University Press. ISBN 0-300-09607-0.
- Robertson, David; Crawley, Peter; Barker, Adam; Whitmore, Sandrine (2005). Norfolk Archaeological Unit Report No. 1045: Norfolk Rapid Coastal Zone Archaeological Survey (PDF). Norwich: Norfolk Archaeological Unit.
- Turner, R K; Bateman, I J; Adger W N (2001). Economics of Coastal and Water Resources: Valuing Environmental Functions (Studies in Ecological Economics). London: Springer. ISBN 0-7923-6504-6.
