= Booton Common =

Protected area in Norfolk, England

Coordinates: 52.763°N 1.129°E

- Site of Special Scientific Interest
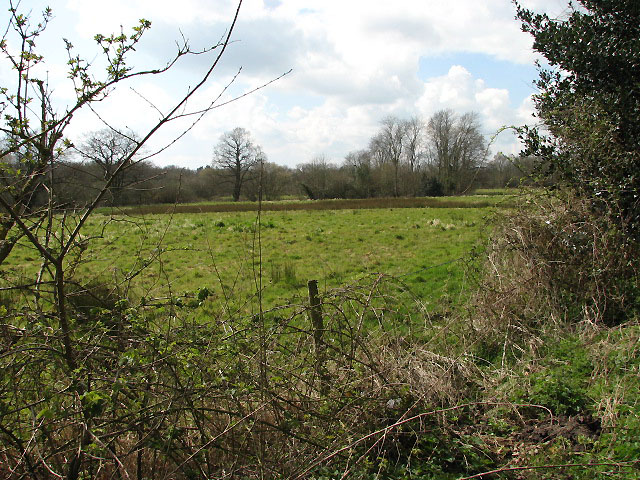
- Location of Booton Common.
- Area of search: Norfolk, England
- Grid reference: TG 112 230
- Interest: Biological
- Area: 8.2 hectares (20 acres)
- Notification date: 1984
- Location map: Magic Map

Booton Common is an 8.2-hectare (20-acre) biological Site of Special Scientific Interest north-west of Norwich in Norfolk, England. It is managed by the Norfolk Wildlife Trust and is a Special Area of Conservation.

The common has diverse habitats, including wet calcareous fen grassland, acid heath, tall fen, alder woodland and a stream. Wet hollows are floristically rich and there are a variety of breeding birds.

The site is open to the public.
