= Thorpe Marshes =

Nature reserve in Norfolk, England

Coordinates: 52.625°N 1.348°E

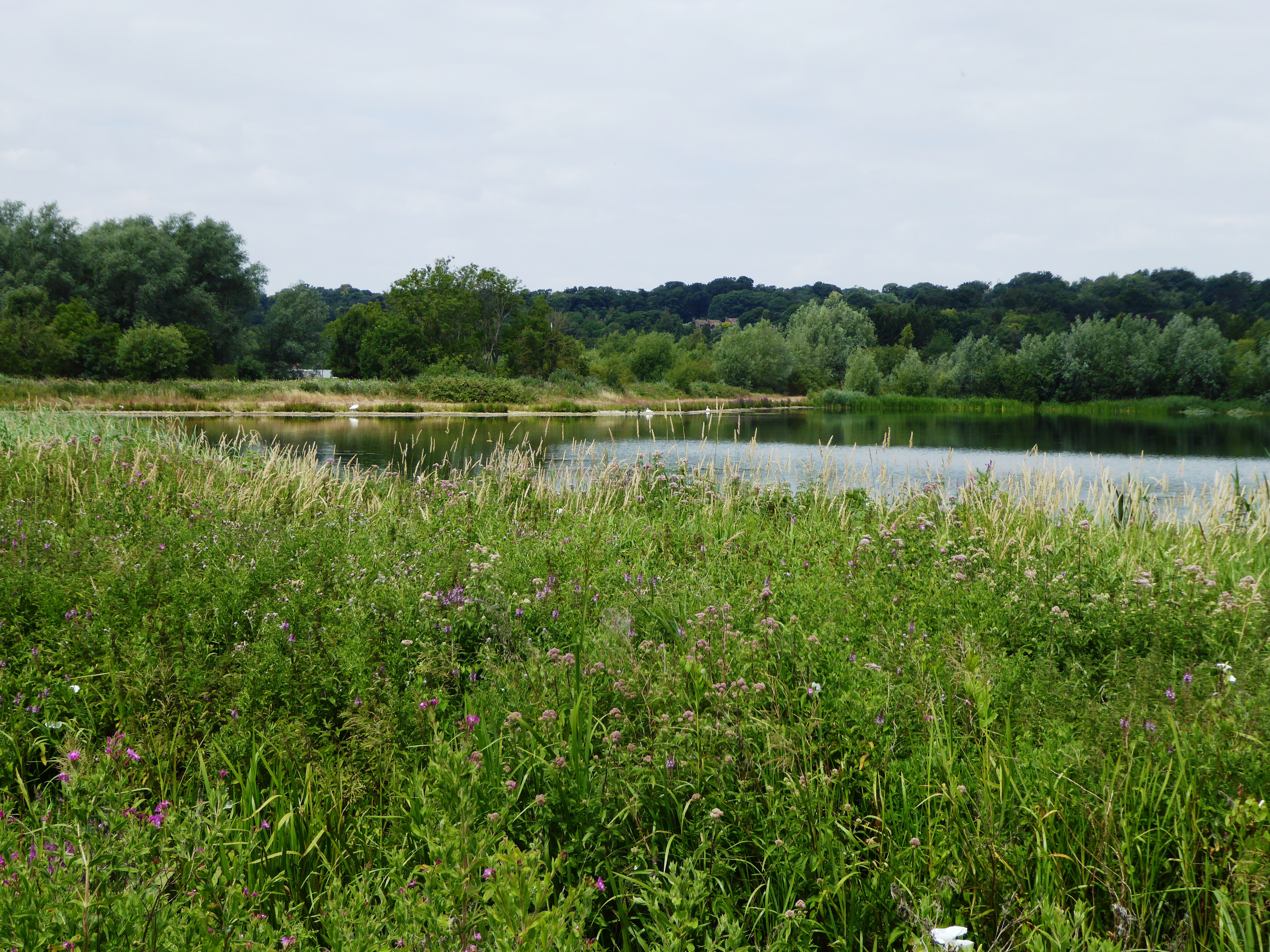
- Interactive map of Thorpe Marshes
- Type: Nature reserve
- Location: Norwich, Norfolk
- OS grid: TG 267083
- Area: 25 hectares (62 acres)
- Manager: Norfolk Wildlife Trust

Thorpe Marshes is a 25-hectare (62-acre) nature reserve east of Norwich in Norfolk. It is managed by the Norfolk Wildlife Trust.

This site has a lake called St Andrew's Broad, which hosts waterbirds such as great crested grebes, cormorants, tufted ducks, gadwalls and grey herons. There are also flower rich marshes, and dragonflies and damselflies inhabit the many dykes.

There is access to footpaths through the site.
