= Sparham Pools =

Nature reserve near Sparham, England, United Kingdom

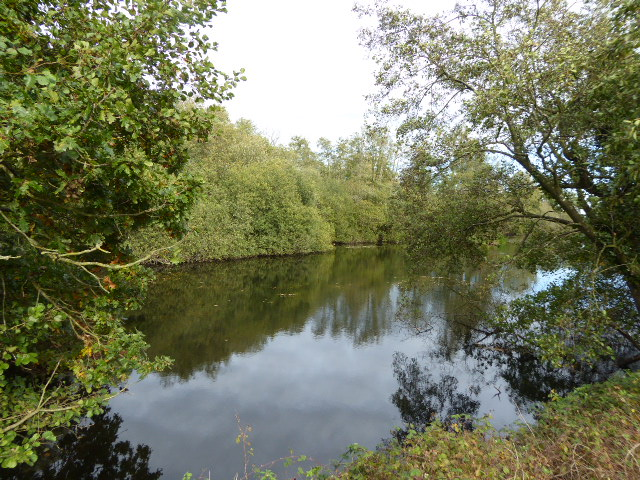
- Interactive map of Sparham Pools
- Type: Nature reserve
- Location: Sparham, Norfolk
- OS grid: TG 075178
- Coordinates: 52°43′08″N 01°04′14″E
- Area: 12.2 ha (30 acres)
- Manager: Norfolk Wildlife Trust

Sparham Pools is a 12.2-hectare (30-acre) nature reserve south of Sparham in Norfolk. It is leased and managed by the Norfolk Wildlife Trust.

These former gravel pits are now pools which have several islands. Wildfowl include shoveler, gadwall, mallard and tufted duck. Sand martins and common kingfishers breed on the banks and common terns on the islands.

There is access from Lyng Road.
