= River Tat =

River in Norfolk, England

Tat
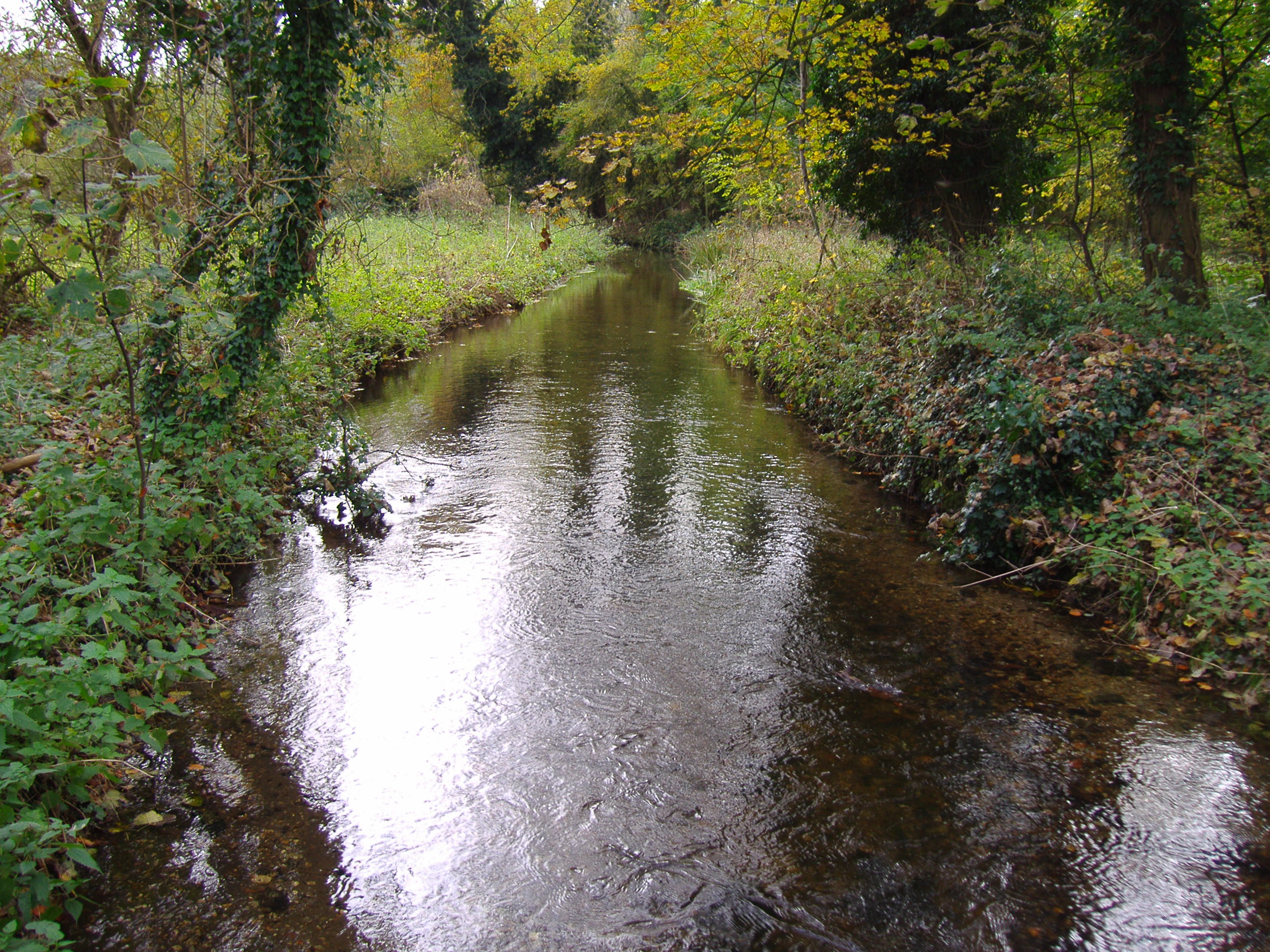

- Location of the river mouth within Norfolk

Location
- Country: England
- Region: Norfolk

Physical characteristics
- Source: Syderstone Common
  - location: Tattersett
  - coordinates: 52.8476°N 0.7252°E
  - elevation: 48 m (157 ft)
- Mouth: River Wensum
  - location: Tatterford
  - coordinates: 52.8171°N 0.7820°E
  - elevation: 39 m (128 ft)
- Length: 7.2 km (4.5 mi)

Basin features
- River system: River Wensum

The River Tat is a short river in the County of Norfolk, England. It is an important headwater for the River Wensum of which it is a tributary. Its source is on Syderstone Common, just north of the village of Tattersett. The marshes and pools of Syderstone Common that provide the headwaters for the river are a site of special scientific interest (SSSI) and are the home of a viable colony of the rare Natterjack Toad.
