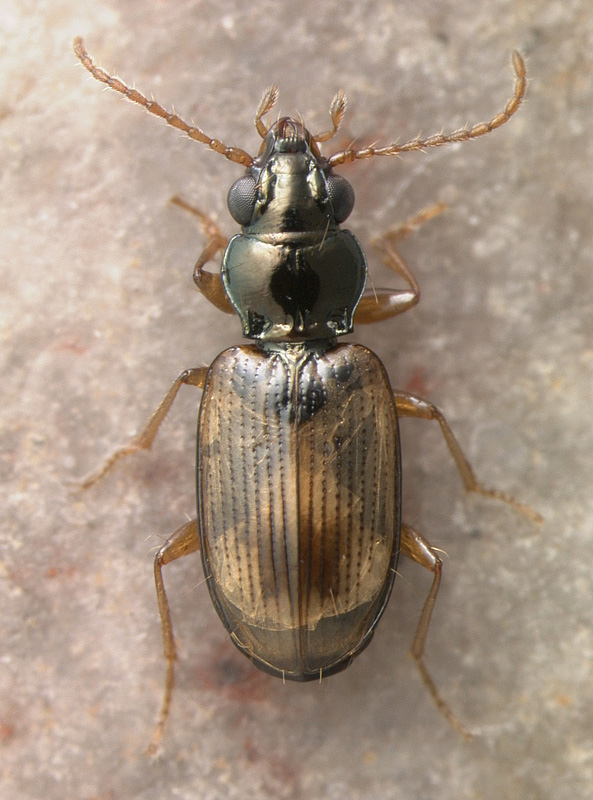

Scientific classification
- Kingdom: Animalia
- Phylum: Arthropoda
- Class: Insecta
- Order: Coleoptera
- Suborder: Adephaga
- Family: Carabidae
- Genus: Bembidion
- Species: B. ephippium

Binomial name
- Bembidion ephippium (Marsham, 1802)

= Bembidion ephippium =

Species of beetle

Bembidion ephippium is a small, fast-moving water beetle in the Trechinae subfamily that can be found in such Belgian cities as Nieuwpoort and Ostend. It can also be found in Wimereux, France, and Orford Ness, Great Britain.

== Threat status ==
The species is considered to be Critically Endangered in Belgium. It is under protection since September 22, 1980.
