= Honeypot Wood =

Site of Special Scientific Interest in Norfolk, England

Coordinates: 52.692°N 0.857°E

- Site of Special Scientific Interest
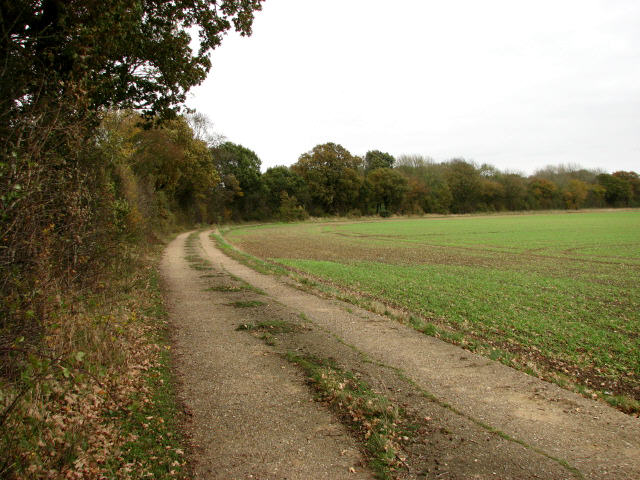
- Location of Honeypot Wood.
- Area of search: Norfolk
- Grid reference: TF 932 143
- Interest: Biological
- Area: 9.5 hectares (23 acres)
- Notification date: 1985
- Location map: Magic Map

Honeypot Wood is a 9.5-hectare (23-acre) biological Site of Special Scientific Interest west of Dereham in Norfolk, England. It is managed by the Norfolk Wildlife Trust.

This is an ancient coppiced wood on calcareous soil. It has a rich ground layer, which is dominated by dog's mercury, and other flora include greater butterfly-orchid and broad-leaved helleborine. A total of 208 plant species have been recorded.

There is public access to the site.
