= Norfolk Wildlife Trust =

British nature reserve

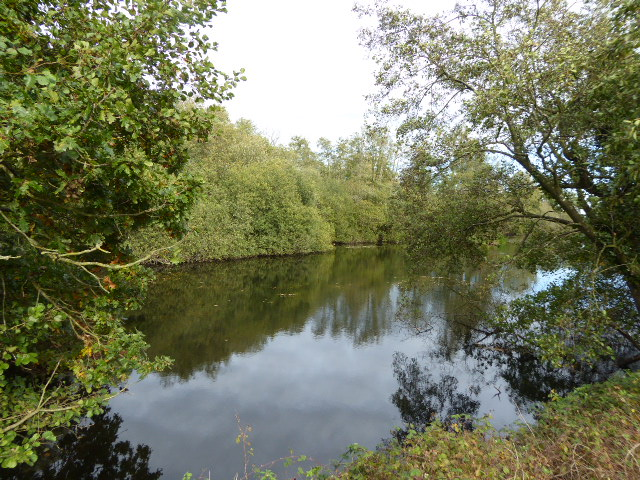
- Sparham Pools
- Formation: 1926
- Headquarters: Norwich
- Members: 35,500
- Website: Norfolk Wildlife Trust website

The Norfolk Wildlife Trust (NWT) is one of 46 wildlife trusts covering Great Britain, Northern Ireland, Isle of Man and Alderney. Founded as the Norfolk Naturalists Trust by Sydney Long in 1926, it is the oldest of all the trusts. It has over 35,500 members and eight local groups and it manages more than fifty nature reserves and other protected sites. (Note: The NWT states that it manages over 50 sites, but only 32 of them are listed on its website and thus in this article.) It also gives conservation advice to individuals and organisations, provides educational services to young people on field trips and organises entertainment and information events at nature reserves.

The NWT reserves include twenty-six Sites of Special Scientific Interests, nine national nature reserves, twelve Nature Conservation Review sites, sixteen Special Areas of Conservation, twelve Special Protection Areas, eleven Ramsar sites, two local nature reserves, four Geological Conservation Review sites and five which are in Areas of Outstanding Natural Beauty. NWT also claims to manage the 'smallest wildlife trust nature reserve in the UK' in the Hethel Old Thorn.

The current Chief Executive Officer of the Trust is Eliot Lyne and current President is natural history writer Patrick Barkham.The NWT has its headquarters on Thorpe Road in Norwich City Centre.

== Key ==
=== Public access ===
- FEE = Fee charged for access
- FP = public access to footpaths through the site
- PL = public access at limited times
- YES = public access to the whole or most of the site

=== Other classifications ===
- AONB = Area of Outstanding Natural Beauty
- GCR = Geological Conservation Review
- LNR = Local nature reserve
- NCR = Nature Conservation Review
- NNR = National nature reserve
- Ramsar = Ramsar site, an internationally important wetland site
- SAC = Special Area of Conservation
- SPA = Special Protection Area under the European Union Directive on the Conservation of Wild Birds
- SSSI = Site of Special Scientific Interest

== Sites ==
Site	Photograph	Area (Note: The area and location are taken from the Wildlife Trust page for each site.)	Location	Public access	Classifications	Description
Alderfen Broad	Alderfen Broad	20 hectares (49 acres)	Norwich; 52.724°N 1.483°E; TG 353 197	YES	Ramsar, SAC, SPA, SSSI	This area of fenland peat has open water, carr woodland and reedswamp. Breeding birds include the great crested grebe, water rail, common grasshopper warbler and reed warbler.
Barton Broad	Barton Broad	164 hectares (410 acres)	Norwich; 52.733°N 1.479°E; TG 350 207	YES	NCR, NNR, Ramsar, SAC, SPA SSSI	The Broad was created in the Middle Ages by digging for peat and the River Ant was later diverted through it, which allowed navigation. It has diverse aquatic plants and fish, and the surrounding fens have nationally rare plants and invertebrates.
Booton Common	Booton Common	8 hectares (20 acres)	Norwich; 52.762°N 1.127°E; TG 111 228	YES	SAC, SSSI	The common has diverse habitats, including wet calcareous fen grassland, acid heath, tall fen, alder woodland and a stream. Wet hollows are floristically rich and there are a variety of breeding birds.
Cley Marshes	Cley Marshes	160 hectares (400 acres)	Holt; 52.954°N 1.056°E; TG 054 440	FEE	AONB, GCR, NCR, Ramsar, SAC, SPA, SSSI	This is the NWT's oldest reserve, purchased in 1926 as a bird sanctuary. It has saline lagoons, a shingle beach, grazing marshes and reedbeds, which support many wintering and migrating wildfowl and waders.
Cockshoot Broad	Cockshoot Broad	5 hectares (12 acres)	Norwich; 52.695°N 1.466°E; TG 343 165	YES	NCR, NNR Ramsar, SAC, SPA SSSI	The water quality of this broad is very high and it has large beds of water lilies, which provide habitats for many insects, including red-eyed and variable damselflies.
East Winch Common	East Winch Common	31 hectares (77 acres)	King's Lynn; 52.716°N 0.512°E; TF 698 161	YES	SSSI	This site is mainly wet acid heath on peat, and it is dominated by heather and cross-leaved heath. There are many wet hollows, which have diverse fen and mire flora, and areas of young woodland.
East Wretham Heath	East Wretham Heath	143 hectares (350 acres)	Thetford; 52.463°N 0.814°E; TL 913 887	YES	NCR, SAC, SPA, SSSI	The principal ecological interest of this site lies in areas of Breckland grassland and two meres, which are supplied by ground water and fluctuate irregularly. These conditions have led to unusual plant communities which are tolerant of alternate wetting and drying, such as reed canary grass and amphibious bistort.
Foxley Wood	Foxley Wood	123 hectares (300 acres)	Dereham; 52.765°N 1.036°E; TG 049 229	YES	NCR, NNR, SSSI	This is the largest area of ancient woodland in the county. The flora is diverse, with more than 250 species recorded, and invertebrates include several rare butterflies, such as the purple emperor and white admiral.
Hethel Old Thorn	Hethel Old Thorn	0.025 hectares (0.062 acres)	Norwich; 52.559°N 1.201°E; TG 171 005	YES		This is the smallest wildlife trust nature reserve in Britain, consisting of one ancient hawthorn tree, which may date to the thirteenth century. In 1755 its girth was recorded as 9 feet 1 inch (2.77 metres) and it has now decayed to a much smaller size, but it is still healthy.
Hickling Broad	Hickling Broad	600 hectares (1,500 acres)	Norwich; 52.743°N 1.596°E; TG 428 222	FEE	AONB, GCR, NCR, NNR, Ramsar, SAC, SPA, SSSI	This is the largest of The Broads, and it has large breeding populations of waterbirds. Rare insects include the swallowtail and Norfolk hawker dragonfly, and there are mammals such as red deer and Chinese water deer.
Hoe Rough	Hoe Rough	12 hectares (30 acres)	Dereham; 52.713°N 0.927°E; TF 978 168	YES	SSSI	This is a mixture of grassland and wet fen. Around 200 species of invertebrates have been recorded, including the rare great crested newt. Notable plants include green-winged and early marsh orchids.
Holme Dunes	Holme Dunes	192 hectares (470 acres)	Hunstanton; 52.974°N 0.551°E; TF 714 449	FEE	AONB, GCR, NCR, NNR, Ramsar, SAC, SPA, SSSI	This site provides a refuge for many migrating birds such as northern wheatears, wrynecks, yellow-browed warblers and barred warblers. Other fauna include natterjack toads, butterflies and dragonflies.
Honeypot Wood	Honeypot Wood	10 hectares (25 acres)	Dereham; 52.692°N 0.860°E; TF 934 143	YES	SSSI	This is an ancient coppiced wood on calcareous soil. It has a rich ground layer, which is dominated by dog's mercury, and other flora include greater butterfly-orchid and broad-leaved helleborine. A total of 208 plant species have been recorded.
Lolly Moor	Lolly Moor	3 hectares (7.4 acres)	Dereham; 52.654°N 0.944°E; TF 992 103	YES		This site has wet grassland, scrub and alder carr. Flora include cowslip, lesser celandine, southern marsh orchid, marsh helleborine and common twayblade.
Lower Wood, Ashwellthorpe	Lower Wood	37 hectares (91 acres)	Norwich; 52.536°N 1.158°E; TM 143 978	YES	SSSI	This ancient wood on chalky boulder clay has a diverse ground flora with uncommon species such as wood spurge, early-purple orchid, common twayblade, ramsons, water avens and woodruff.
Martham Broad	Martham Broad	60 hectares (150 acres)	Great Yarmouth; 52.724°N 1.650°E; TG 466 203	YES	NNR, Ramsar, SAC, SPA, SSSI	This reserve is composed of two shallow broads divided by the River Thurne, together with fen, reedbeds and marshes. There are a number of bat species and breeding birds include bearded tits, common terns, Cetti's warblers and marsh harriers.
Narborough Railway Line	Narborough Railway Line	8 hectares (20 acres)	King's Lynn; 52.676°N 0.587°E; TF 750 118	PL	SSSI	This nineteenth-century embankment is probably the most ecologically diverse chalk grassland site in the county, with many flowering plants which attract a wide range of butterflies. There is also a variety of mosses and molluscs.
New Buckenham Common	New Buckenham Common	37 hectares (91 acres)	Norwich; 52.472°N 1.076°E; TM 090 905	YES	SSSI	This unimproved grassland is traditionally managed by grazing. It has the largest colony of green-winged orchids in the county, and there are a stream and pool which have aquatic plants.
Pigneys Wood	Pigneys Wood	23.5 hectares (58 acres)	North Walsham; 52.837°N 1.407°E; TG 296 321	YES	LNR	This wood has 40 different species of trees, most of which have been planted since 1993, but there is a 450-year old oak. There is also a range of birds, butterflies and dragonflies. Mammals include otters, water voles and European badgers.
Ranworth Broad	Ranworth Broad	136 hectares (340 acres)	Norwich; 52.682°N 1.487°E; TG 358 151	YES	NCR, NNR Ramsar, SAC, SPA, SSSI	Many species of birds can be seen from the floating Broads Wildlife Centre such as great crested grebes, wigeons, gadwalls, kingfishers and cormorants. There are also areas of woodland and reedbeds.
Ringstead Downs	Ringstead Downs	11 hectares (27 acres)	Hunstanton; 52.929°N 0.537°E; TF 706 399	YES	AONB, SSSI	This is a dry chalk valley which was carved out by glacial meltwaters It is species-rich as it has never been ploughed, and it is the largest surviving area of chalk downland surviving in the county. The butterflies are diverse.
Roydon Common and Grimston Warren	Grimston Warren	365 hectares (900 acres)	King's Lynn; 52.777°N 0.516°E; TF 698 229	YES	NCR, NNR, Ramsar, SAC, SSSI	The common is described by Natural England as "one of the best examples in Britain of a lowland mixed valley mire". It has diverse habitats, including wet acid heath, calcareous fen and dry heath on acid sands. There are rare plants, birds and insects, including the black darter dragonfly.
Salthouse Marshes	Salthouse Marshes	66 hectares (160 acres)	Holt; 52.956°N 1.098°E; TG 082 443	YES	AONB, GCR, NCR, Ramsar, SAC, SPA, SSSI	This site has grazing marsh and small pools. Birds include snow buntings, Lapland buntings, little egrets, shore larks and barn owls.
Scarning Fen	Scarning Fen	4 hectares (9.9 acres)	Dereham; 52.670°N 0.928°E; TF 981 121	YES	NCR, SAC, SSSI	This small reserve has chalky valley mire, carr and grassland. Twenty-nine nationally scarce invertebrates have been recorded, and it is the only site in the county for the small red damselfly. There are a number of rare plants, including liverworts and mosses.
Sparham Pools	Sparham Pools	12.2 hectares (30 acres)	Norwich; 52.718°N 1.071°E; TG 075 178	YES		These former gravel pits are now pools which have several islands. Wildfowl include shoveler, gadwall, mallard and tufted duck. Sand martins and kingfishers breed on the banks and common terns on the islands.
Syderstone Common	Syderstone Common	24 hectares (59 acres)	King's Lynn; 52.852°N 0.722°E; TF 834 318	YES	SSSI	The common has heath and grassland areas in the valley of the River Tat. Pools on sand and gravel provide suitable habitats for five species of breeding amphibians, including the nationally rare natterjack toad.
Thompson Common	Thompson Common	140 hectares (350 acres)	Attleborough; 52.633°N 0.860°E; TL 941 966	YES	LNR, NCR SAC, SSSI	This grassland site in the valley of a tributary of the River Wissey has a number of pingos, damp and water filled depressions formed by the melting of ice at the end of the last glaciation. It also has a lake called Thompson Water which, together with its surrounding reedswamp, is important for breeding birds.
Thorpe Marshes	Thorpe Marshes	25 hectares (62 acres)	Norwich; 52.625°N 1.348°E; TG 267 083	FP		This site has a lake called St Andrew's Broad, which hosts waterbirds such as great crested grebes, cormorants, tufted ducks, gadwalls and grey herons. There are also flower rich marshes, and dragonflies and damselflies inhabit the many dykes.
Thursford Wood	Thursford Wood	10 hectares (25 acres)	Fakenham; 52.861°N 0.938°E; TF 979 333	YES		The oak trees in this wood are some of the oldest in the county, and some may be over 500 years old. The site also has a variety of woodland birds, as well as many ferns and fungi.
Upton Broad and Marshes	Upton Broad and Marshes	318 hectares (790 acres)	Norwich; 52.669°N 1.519°E; TG 380 137	YES	NCR, Ramsar, SAC, SPA, SSSI	This is described by Natural England as "an outstanding example of unreclaimed wetland and grazing marsh". Its rich invertebrate fauna includes eighteen species of freshwater snail, and an outstanding variety of dragonflies and damselflies, including the nationally rare Norfolk hawker.
Wayland Wood	Wayland Wood	34 hectares (84 acres)	Thetford; 52.560°N 0.837°E; TL 924 996	YES	SSSI	This semi-natural wood on wet calcareous boulder clay is managed by coppicing. Breeding birds include woodcocks, lesser spotted woodpeckers and nuthatches.
Weeting Heath	Weeting Heath	138 hectares (340 acres)	Brandon; 52.463°N 0.585°E; TL 757 881	FEE	NCR, NNR, SAC, SPA, SSSI	This grass and lichen heath is grazed by rabbits. It has a high density of breeding birds, including stone-curlews. One arable field is reserved for uncommon Breckland plants.

== See also ==
- List of Local Nature Reserves in Norfolk
- List of Sites of Special Scientific Interest in Norfolk

== Sources ==
- Ratcliffe, Derek, ed. (1977). A Nature Conservation Review. Vol. 2. Cambridge, UK: Cambridge University Press. ISBN 978-0-521-21403-2.
