= A Nature Conservation Review =

1977 two-volume work by Derek Ratcliffe

- First edition, volume 1
- Author: Derek Ratcliffe
- Language: English
- Subject: Nature conservation in Great Britain
- Genre: Non-fiction
- Published: 1977 Cambridge University Press
- Publication place: United Kingdom
- Media type: Print (Hardback & Paperback)
- ISBN: 0-521-21159-X
- OCLC: 3017706
- Dewey Decimal: 333.9/5/0941
- LC Class: QH77.G7 N39

A Nature Conservation Review is a two-volume work by Derek Ratcliffe, published by Cambridge University Press in 1977. It set out to identify the most important places for nature conservation in Great Britain. It is often known by the initials NCR, and sites listed in it are termed "NCR sites".

The approach adopted by Ratcliffe was adapted and applied to the selection of sites important for geological conservation in the Geological Conservation Review. A Marine Nature Conservation Review has also been published.

Volume 1 set out the rationale and methods used, and gave descriptions of the major habitat types.

Volume 2 consisted entirely of a site inventory. Sites were grouped into six major habitat types:

- Coastal sites - 135 sites
- Woodlands - 234 sites
- Lowland grasslands, heaths and scrub - 159 sites
- Open waters - 99 sites
- Peatlands - 116 sites
- Upland grasslands and heaths - 101 sites

== See also ==
- List of NCR sites
