= List of Sites of Special Scientific Interest in Cumbria =

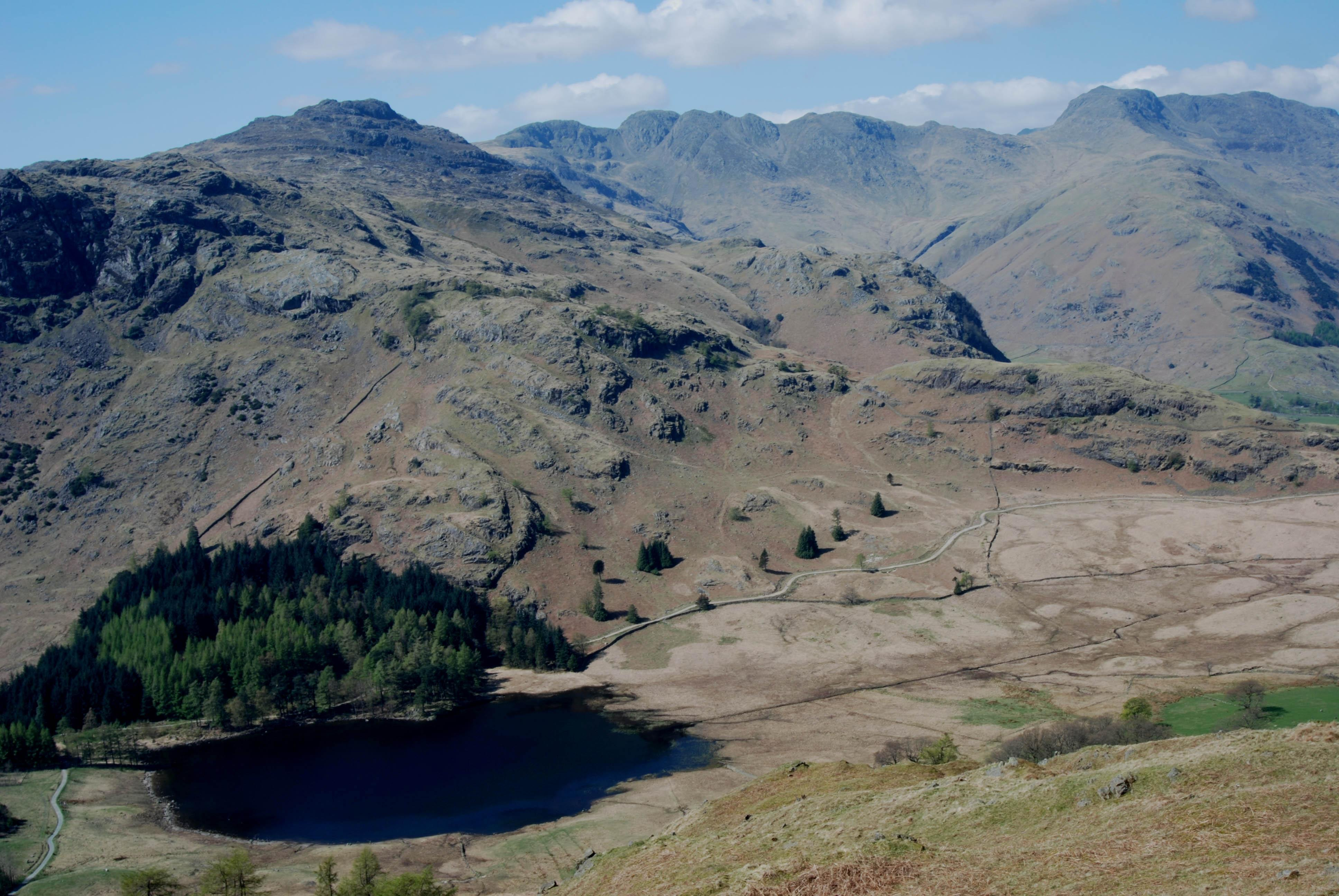
Blea Tarn from Lingmoor Fell

The following is a list of Sites of Special Scientific Interest (SSSIs) in Cumbria, England, United Kingdom. In England the body responsible for designating SSSIs is Natural England, which chooses a site because of its fauna, flora, geological or physiographical features.

As of July 2012 there were 278 SSSIs within Cumbria. Of these, 70 are listed purely for their geological interest and 170 for their biological interest. A further 38 have both geological and biological interest.

The county includes the whole of the Lake District National Park, as well as three Areas of Outstanding Natural Beauty: the Solway Coast, part of Arnside and Silverdale, and part of the North Pennines.

For SSSIs in other counties, see List of SSSIs by Area of Search.

== Sites ==
Site name	Reason for designation		Area^{[A]}		Coordinates & Grid ref^{[B]}	Year in which notified	Other designations	Map^{[C]} & Citation
Site name	Biological interest	Geological interest	Hectares	Acres	Coordinates & Grid ref^{[B]}	Year in which notified	Other designations	Map^{[C]} & Citation
Alston Shingle Banks			18.3	45.2	NY715449	1968	GCR, SAC	Map
Annaside			17.3	42.7	SD081875	1989		Map
Annaside and Gutterby Banks			23.8	58.9	SD092852	1998	GCR, NP	Map
Appleby Fells			10,693.0	26,423.0	NY758242	1951	AONB, SAC, GCR, MoD, NCR, SAC	Map
Argill Woods and Pastures			28.1	69.4	NY847137	1985	WT,	Map
Armboth Fells			2,346.6	5,798.7	NY287166	1975	GCR, NT, NCR, SAC	Map
Arnside Knott			167.9	415.0	SD446771	1962	AONB, NT, NCR,	Map
Ash Fell			548.3	1,355.0	NY736060	1988		Map
Ash Fell Edge			7.6	18.9	NY734048	1984	GCR	Map
Ashgill Quarry			160.4	396.4	SD276957	1954	GCR	Map
Augill Valley Pasture			2.9	7.2	NY816146	1990		Map
Backside Beck and Spen Gill			6.4	15.8	SD696985	1954	GCR	Map
Barf and Thornthwaite			23.4	57.7	NY217265	1997	ESA, GCR, NP	Map
Barker Scar			17.6	43.4	SD336777	1985	GCR	Map
Bassenthwaite Lake			676.1	1,670.8	NY218286	1994	NCR, SAC	Map
Baysbrown Wood			48.9	120.8	NY314046	1985		Map
Beckfoot Quarry			1.8	4.5	NY164003	1985	GCR, NP,	Map
Beech Hill Wood			30.3	74.9	NY502017	1984		Map
Belah Woods and Pastures			49.1	121.4	NY838105	2000		Map
Biglands Bog			11.6	28.6	NY258537	1984	WT, NCR	Map
Birk Fell			265.6	656.2	NY404180	1987	NP, NCR, SAC	Map
Birk Fell Hawse Mine			2.1	5.1	NY292015	1997		Map
Birkett Hill and High Out Wood			57.8	142.8	NY792074	1988		Map
Birky Cleugh			2.1	5.3	NY589753	1990	GCR	Map
Black Moss			16.3	40.3	NY029107	1986		Map
Black Snib			29.8	73.5	NY423676	1993		Map
Blackdike Bog			9.5	23.4	NY407232	1983		Map
Blagill Mine			0.7	1.7	NY741473	1990	GCR	Map
Blea Tarn			3.7	9.2	NY293044	1989	GCR	Map
Blea Water			102.7	253.8	NY445107	1985	NP, NCR,	Map
Blelham Tarn & Bog			51.4	127.1	NY365004	1985	GCR, NNR, NCR	Map
Bolton Fell & Walton Mosses			978.15		NY486688	2015		Map
Borrow Beck Meadows			7.6	18.7	NY546041	1988	ESA, NP, SAC	Map
Bothel Craggs Quarry			0.2	0.4	NY186371	1989	GCR	Map
Bowber Head and Piper Hole Meadows			20.6	50.9	NY737033	1987	SAC	Map
Bowness Common			803.3	1,985.0	NY214601	1983	AONB, NNR, NCR, RSPB, SAC	Map
Bowness Knott			40.2	99.4	NY110155	1985	GCR	Map
Braithwaite Moss			33.9	83.7	NY237248	2000	ESA, NP, SAC	Map
Bramcrag Quarry & Wanthwaite Mine			46.6	115.2	NY322221	1990	GCR	Map
Brantrake Moss & Devoke Water			120.3	297.3	SD156969	1986		Map
Brathay Quarries			25.3	62.4	NY356016	1987	GCR	Map
Bretherdale Meadows			11.6	28.7	NY586043	1987	SAC	Map
Broad Dales			15.9	39.3	NY254523	1992		Map
Brothers Water			34.0	83.9	NY402126	1986	ESA, NP,	Map
Browgill & Stockdale Becks			26.5	65.5	NY489057	1987	GCR	Map
Buckbarrow Beck			2.0	4.9	SD136909	1997	GCR	Map
Burns Beck Moss			20.4	50.3	SD593878	1985		Map
Burrells Quarry			0.7	1.8	NY676180	1987	GCR	Map
Butterburn Flow			401.4	991.8	NY672763	1984	NCR, Ramsar site, SAC	Map
Buttermere			93.3	230.4	NY181159	1983	NCR	Map
Buttermere Fells			6,144.2	15,182.7	NY204193	1989	GCR, NT, NCR, SAC	Map
Butterwick Meadows			10.1	24.9	NY508192	1994	ESA, NP,	Map
Cairnbridge Sand Pit			2.4	5.9	NY506541	1985		Map
Castlehead Wood			8.2	20.2	NY269227	1984	NP, NT, NCR,	Map
Caudbeck Flow			456.7	1,128.6	NY588727	1986	NCR, SAC	Map
Cautley Thwaite Meadows and Ecker Secker Beck			48.2	119.1	SD697955	1989	GCR, NP, SAC	Map
Chapel Bridge Meadows			2.7	6.6	NY230192	1989		Map
Claife Tarns and Mires			147.8	365.2	SD373970	1985	NT	Map
Cliburn Moss			36.8	90.8	NY577256	1985	NCR	Map
Clints Crags, Blindcrake			5.2	12.8	NY163354	1988		Map
Clints Quarry			13.8	34.1	NY007123	1987	GCR, WT	Map
Clints Quarry, Moota			12.6	31.0	NY160357	1997	ESA, NP, SAC	Map
Comb Beck			0.5	1.2	NY182149	1996	ESA, GCR, NP	Map
Combe Scar			21.4	53.0	SD678875	1994	ESA, NP	Map
Coniston Mines and Quarries			127.9	316.1	SD296984	1997	GCR, NP	Map
Cotehill Pastures and Ponds			9.9	24.4	NY465517	1985		Map
Cowraik Quarry			5.2	12.9	NY542309	1987	GCR	Map
Cropple How Mire			9.5	23.4	SD131975	1985		Map
Crosby Gill			122.3	302.3	NY613113	1983	NCR, SAC	Map
Crosby Ravensworth Fell			1,546.6	3,821.6	NY597075	1991	SAC	Map
Cumpston Hill			4.0	9.9	SD784976	1998	GCR	Map
Cumwhitton Moss			43.6	107.6	NY514519	1987	NCR	Map
Deepdale Meadows			13.8	34.1	SD714854	1989	NP, SAC	Map
Dodgson Wood			128.4	317.2	SD301927	1986	NP, NT,	Map
Drigg Coast			1,400.0	3,459.5	SD075956	1986	LNR, WT, MoD, NP, NCR, SAC	Map
Drigg Holme			9.0	22.2	SD075989	1987		Map
Drumburgh Moss			187.0	462.2	NY254584	1986	WT, NNR, NCR, SAC	Map
Duddon Estuary			6,786.0	16,768.6	SD169777	1991	SAC, NNR, NP, NT, NCR, Ramsar site, RSPB, SAC	Map
Duddon Mosses			355.2	877.8	SD223852	1987	ESA, NNR, NCR, SAC	Map
Duddon Valley Woodlands			361.1	892.3	SD222965	1994	NP, NT	Map
Dungeon Ghyll			9.8	24.3	NY285069	1986	NT	Map
Eden Gorge			141.8	350.4	NY523429	1986		Map
Ellery Sike			4.2	10.3	NY543762	1998	GCR	Map
Elliscales Quarry			1.4	3.5	SD224747	1986	GCR,	Map
Elterwater			36.2	89.4	NY333041	1984	NT	Map
Ennerdale			338.5	836.3	NY107150	1984	NT	Map
Esthwaite Water			158.5	391.7	SD361963	1987	NNR, NCR, Ramsar site	Map
Ewefell Mire			32.2	79.5	NY697067	2000	SAC	Map
Eycott Hill			125.4	309.9	NY388296	1988	GCR	Map
Far Arnside			2.1	5.2	SD450761	1986	AONB	Map
Farleton Knott			290.7	718.3	SD543799	1988	GCR, NNR, NCR, SAC	Map
Finglandrigg Woods			97.1	239.9	NY275566	1985	NNR, NCR	Map
Florence Mine			27.1	67.0	NY021105	1996	GCR	Map
Force Crag Mine			53.2	131.4	NY196215	1999	ESA, GCR, NP	Map
Foulshaw Moss			346.9	857.1	SD455825	1996	NP, SAC	Map
Gelt Woods			28.9	71.3	NY526587	1985		Map
Geltsdale & Glendue Fells			8,059.1	19,914.3	NY606545	1984	SAC, NCR, RSPB, SPA	Map
George Gill			6.6	16.2	NY718188	1997	SAM, GCR,	Map
Gill Beck			3.4	8.3	NY149343	1997	ESA, GCR, NP	Map
Glasson Moss			225.4	556.9	NY237601	1986	AONB, NNR, NCR, SAC	Map
Glencoyne Wood			30.7	75.9	NY385178	1986	NP, SAC	Map
Gowbarrow Park			53.3	131.8	NY417208	1986	NP, NT, NCR,	Map
Gowk Bank			15.1	37.2	NY679739	1985	NNR, NCR, SAC	Map
Great Asby Scar			350.5	866.1	NY655098	1986	GCR, NNR, NCR, SAC	Map
Great Blencow Meadows and Fen			8.0	19.7	NY459327	1990		Map
Great Wood			48.7	120.2	NY274211	1984	NP, NT, NCR, SAC	Map
Greendale Mires			84.8	209.5	NY149056	1985	NP,	Map
Gribbs Meadows			4.3	10.7	NY221558	1986		Map
Haggs Bank			2.2	5.4	NY767451	2000	SAC	Map
Haile Great Wood			31.6	78.0	NY036096	1985		Map
Hale Moss			2.8	7.0	SD510777	1992		Map
Hale Moss Caves			22.4	55.3	SD499771	1991	AONB, GCR	Map
Hallinhag Wood			15.9	39.2	NY429200	1984	NP, SAC	Map
Hallsenna Moor			30.0	74.2	NY068005	1986	NNR, NCR,	Map
Harthwaite Sike			1.5	3.7	NY704246	1986	GCR	Map
Helbeck Wood			91.1	225.1	NY786162	1984	NCR, SAC	Map
Hell Gill			1.3	3.3	SD786969	1985	GCR, NP	Map
Helvellyn & Fairfield			2,488.6	6,149.5	NY359140	1989	ESA, GCR, NP, NCR, SAC	Map
High Leys			9.5	23.4	NY062180	1985	NNR, NCR	Map
High Lickbarrow Mires and Pastures			19.5	48.2	SD423971	1988		Map
Hollin Hill			4.5	11.0	NY592050	1988		Map
Hollows Farm Section			2.3	5.8	NY248170	1987	GCR, NT	Map
Honister Crag			302.9	748.4	NY208140	1988	GCR, NT, SAC	Map
Humphrey Head			28.7	70.9	SD390738	1984	GCR, NCR	Map
Hutton Roof Crags			396.6	979.9	SD554774	1988	GCR, NNR, NCR, SAC	Map
Iron Pit Spring Quarry			1.2	3.0	SD310785	1994	GCR,	Map
Irthing Gorge			44.5	110.0	NY634685	1984	NCR	Map
Janny Wood Section			1.0	2.4	NY782036	1985	GCR	Map
Jenny Dam			0.8	2.0	SD462954	1990		Map
Jockie's Syke			3.3	8.2	NY423756	1994	GCR,	Map
Johnny Wood			36.3	89.6	NY251143	1984	NP, NT, NCR, SAC	Map
Jumb Quarry			1.6	3.9	NY448073	1994	GCR, NP	Map
Keisley Quarry			7.8	19.2	NY714238	1986	GCR	Map
Kershope Bridge			5.8	14.4	NY499833	1984	GCR	Map
Kielder Mires			4,801.4	11,864.5	NY568899	1995	NNR, Ramsar site, SAC	Map
Kingwater			1.2	2.9	NY609697	1985	GCR	Map
Kirkby Moor			779.9	1,927.2	SD251822	1991		Map
Knipe Tarn			5.7	14.0	SD426943	1987	ESA, NP	Map
Lamonby Verges and Fields			13.5	33.3	NY397352	1985		Map
Langdale Pikes			473.2	1,169.3	NY286074	1998	GCR, NP	Map
Langdale, Bowderdale and Carlin Gill			1,775.9	4,388.3	SD675996	1997	GCR, NP	Map
Lazonby Fell			329.4	814.0	NY515393	1984	NCR	Map
Leck Beck Head Catchment Area			691.9	1,709.6	SD669793	1986	GCR	Map
Little Asby Inrakes and Outrakes			12.1	30.0	NY698102	1985		Map
Little Langdale Tarn			36.8	91.0	NY308031	1986	NP	Map
Little Mell Fell Quarry			0.1	0.3	NY429239	1996	GCR, NP	Map
Lodore - Troutdale Woods			367.4	907.8	NY261171	1986	NP, NT, NCR, SAC	Map
Longsleddale Woods			21.6	53.3	NY506024	1984	NP	Map
Loughrigg Fell Flushes			13.5	33.4	NY365043	1993		Map
Low Beckside Meadow			2.3	5.6	NY365292	1994	ESA	Map
Low Church Moss			5.0	12.4	NY015056	1984		Map
Low Wood			76.9	190.1	NY396122	1986	ESA, NP, NT, NCR, SAC	Map
Low Wray Bay			4.0	9.8	NY376012	1998	ESA, GCR, NP	Map
Ludderburn and Candlestick Mires			142.7	352.6	SD403927	1991	ESA, NP	Map
Lyne Woods			142.4	351.8	NY455698	1986	NCR,	Map
Mallerstang-Swaledale Head			6,234.8	15,406.4	NY836017	1992	SAC, NCR, SAC	Map
Marble Quarry and Hale Fell			43.1	106.5	SD498782	1997	AONB, SAC	Map
Maryport Harbour			3.4	8.4	NY029366	1989		Map
Meathop Moss			68.1	168.3	SD441816	1985	WT, NCR, SAC	Map
Meathop Woods and Quarry			39.1	96.6	SD437796	1984	GCR, NP	Map
Melmerby Road Section			0.1	0.3	NY622383	1985	GCR	Map
Middlebarrow			18.1	44.8	SD462764	1997	AONB, SAC	Map
Middlesceugh Woods and Pastures			46.0	113.7	NY400409	1988	SAC	Map
Milkingstead Wood			13.7	33.9	SD153996	1986	NP,	Map
Millfield Verges			2.1	5.2	NY377354	1987		Map
Miterdale Head Wood			3.2	8.0	NY164027	1985	NP,	Map
Mollen Woods			28.1	69.4	NY562708	1987		Map
Moorhouse and Cross Fell			13,817.2	34,143.0	NY721357	1990	SAC, GCR, NNR, NP, NCR, SAC	Map
Moorthwaite Moss			12.2	30.2	NY511510	1986	NCR	Map
Morecambe Bay			25,665.2	63,420.2	SD363682	1990	AONB, SAC, NP, NCR, Ramsar site, RSPB, SAC	Map
Mousegill Beck			8.0	19.8	NY829126	1986	GCR	Map
Mungrisdale Mires			108.0	266.8	NY372302	1999	ESA, NP	Map
Murthwaite Park			20.3	50.2	SD710982	1985		Map
Nab Gill Mine			5.0	12.3	NY173012	1997	GCR, NP,	Map
Naddle Forest			518.7	1,281.6	NY494139	1986	GCR, NP, NCR, RSPB, SAC	Map
Newton Reigny Moss			13.2	32.5	NY477309	1985	WT, NCR	Map
Nichols Moss			93.7	231.5	SD431826	1986	ESA, NP, SAC	Map
Oakshaw Ford			6.4	15.8	NY509760	1997	GCR	Map
Orton Moss			64.1	158.3	NY342547	1986	WT, NCR	Map
Orton Pastures			15.5	38.3	NY626093	1985	NCR	Map
Oulton Moss			24.5	60.5	NY253513	1982		Map
Outley Mosses			33.6	83.0	SD362819	1994	NP	Map
Over Water			30.0	74.2	NY251350	1985	NP	Map
Penton Linns			4.3	10.5	NY433773	1986	GCR,	Map
Pets Quarry			1.5	3.6	NY390070	1997	ESA, GCR, NP	Map
Pillar and Ennerdale Fells			1,499.0	3,704.0	NY122129	1992	NCR, SAC	Map
Pinskey Gill			0.5	1.3	NY698038	1989	GCR	Map
Pooley Bridge Section			0.8	1.9	NY464243	1990	GCR	Map
Pus Gill			2.4	6.0	NY699259	1986	GCR	Map
Raisbeck Meadows			13.7	33.8	NY635068	1983	SAC	Map
Ray and Crinkle Crags			147.1	363.6	NY250045	1998	GCR, NP	Map
River Calder Section			0.6	1.4	NY068116	1987	GCR, NP	Map
River Derwent and Tributaries			1,209.8	2,989.4	NY260195	1997	ESA, NP, SAC	Map
River Eden and Tributaries			2,448.7	6,050.8	NY574320	1997	ESA, GCR, NP, SAC	Map
River Ehen (Ennerdale Water To Keekle Confluence)			23.3	57.6	NY050158	1997	ESA, NP, SAC	Map
River Kent and Tributaries			99.7	246.4	SD497967	2000	ESA, NP, SAC	Map
River Nent at Blagill			9.0	22.3	NY742468	2000	GCR, SAC	Map
River Rawthey, Wandale Beck and Sally Beck			43.6	107.8	SD711989	1997	GCR, NP	Map
River South Tyne and Tynebottom Mine			16.9	41.7	NY738420	1990	GCR	Map
Rosthwaite Fell			228.7	565.0	NY258124	1985	GCR, NT	Map
Roudsea Wood & Mosses			482.7	1,192.8	SD347803	1989	SAC, ESA, NNR, NP, NCR, Ramsar site, SAC	Map
Rusland Valley Mosses			94.2	232.8	SD334883	1986	NNR, NCR	Map
Salta Moss			45.6	112.7	NY085452	1982		Map
Sandybeck Meadow			0.4	1.0	NY134268	1985	SAC	Map
Scafell Pikes			1,118.6	2,764.2	NY213066	1988	NT, SAC	Map
Scaleby Moss			68.2	168.6	NY429634	1986	GCR	Map
Scales Wood			54.1	133.7	NY165164	1986	ESA, NP, NCR, SAC	Map
Scandal Beck and Stone Gill			12.7	31.4	NY719050	1987	GCR	Map
Scandal Beck, Brunt Hill			0.1	0.1	NY742024	1987	GCR	Map
Scawgill and Blaze Beck			14.7	36.4	NY179254	1997	ESA, GCR, NP	Map
Scout and Cunswick Scars			373.1	922.0	SD491910	1989	NT, NCR, SAC	Map
Sea Wood			26.6	65.7	SD293734	1984		Map
Seathwaite Copper Mines			1.4	3.5	SD265994	1997	GCR, NP	Map
Seatoller Wood, Sourmilk Gill & Seathwaite Graphite Mine			137.9	340.7	NY233128	1985	ESA, GCR, NP, NCR, SAC	Map
Shap Fell Road Cuttings			17.3	42.7	NY556053	1992	GCR	Map
Shap Fells			2,143.9	5,297.8	NY535095	1988	GCR, SAC	Map
Shaw Meadow & Sea Pasture			8.8	21.7	SD123808	1989	NP,	Map
Short Gill Cave System			35.4	87.4	SD669846	1986	GCR	Map
Siddick Pond			22.4	55.4	NY001303	1984	LNR	Map
Side Pike			10.3	25.4	NY290052	1997	ESA, GCR, NP	Map
Silloth Dunes and Mawbray Bank			189.9	469.3	NY101522	1991		Map
Silver Tarn, Hollas and Harnsey Mosses			5.3	13.2	NX998068	1986		Map
Skelghyll Beck			3.8	9.3	NY396032	1987	GCR, NT	Map
Skelsmergh Tarn			3.6	8.8	SD533967	1984	ESA	Map
Skelton Pasture			11.9	29.3	NY437379	1990	SAC	Map
Skelwith Hill			2.8	6.9	SD331807	1985	GCR	Map
Skiddaw Group			10,384.6	25,660.9	NY299313	1990	GCR, NCR, SAC	Map
Smallcleugh Mine			5.1	12.6	NY787429	1994	GCR	Map
Smardale Gill			116.8	288.6	NY723062	1986	WT, NCR	Map
South Walney and Piel Channel Flats			2,329.9	5,757.2	SD209648	1997	SAC, GCR, WT, NCR, Ramsar site, SAC	Map
Spadeadam Mires			1,135.9	2,807.0	NY648716	1993	SAC	Map
St. Bees Head			157.2	388.5	NX952118	1995	GCR, HC, RSPB,	Map
Stagmire Moss			7.9	19.5	NY737122	1992		Map
Stanley Ghyll			7.8	19.2	SD174997	1986	NP,	Map
Stile End			5.9	14.6	NY473050	1998	GCR, NP	Map
Stonethwaite Woods			100.6	248.7	NY267139	1987	ESA, NP, NCR, SAC	Map
Subberthwaite, Blawith and Torver Low Commons			1,862.6	4,602.6	SD268904	1994	ESA, NP, SAC	Map
Sunbiggin Tarn & Moors and Little Asby Scar			999.8	2,470.6	NY700084	1994	GCR, WT, NCR, SAC	Map
Swindale Beck			0.9	2.2	NY688275	1986	GCR	Map
Swindale Meadows			8.3	20.4	NY511127	1985	ESA, NP, SAC	Map
Swindale Wood			45.9	113.3	NY806161	1985	NCR, SAC	Map
Tarn Hows			190.3	470.3	NY330001	1984	NT	Map
Tarn Moss			17.0	42.0	NY399274	1985	NNR, NCR	Map
Tebay Road Cuttings			9.7	24.0	NY608017	1992	GCR	Map
Temple Sowerby Moss			6.5	16.0	NY615270	1985		Map
The Clouds			106.7	263.7	NY739000	1986	GCR, SAC	Map
The Ings			5.7	14.0	NY268221	1984	NP, NT, NCR,	Map
Thirlmere Woods			46.0	113.6	NY313190	1987	NP, NCR,	Map
Thornhill Moss & Meadows			24.4	60.2	NY181489	1986	NNR, NCR	Map
Thornsgill Beck, Mosedale Beck and Wolf Crags			97.9	242.0	NY356242	1998	GCR, NP	Map
Throstle Shaw and Sandbeds Fan			2.8	6.9	NY234291	1996	ESA, GCR, NP	Map
Thurstonfield Lough			17.9	44.3	NY319562	1984		Map
Tilberthwaite Gill			6.6	16.2	NY302006	1987	NT	Map
Town End Meadows, Little Asby			10.8	26.7	NY706103	1988	SAC	Map
Troutbeck			784.1	1,937.4	NY424082	1990	NT	Map
Udford Low Moss			17.4	43.1	NY581301	1989		Map
Underlaid Wood			106.6	263.4	SD484790	1997	AONB, SAC	Map
Unity Bog			10.5	25.9	NY528590	1984		Map
Upper Dentdale Cave System			61.1	150.9	SD739864	1998	GCR, NP,	Map
Upper Solway Flats & Marshes			14,097.7	34,836.2	NY112603	1988	AONB, SAC, GCR, NCR, Ramsar site, RSPB, SAC	Map
Waberthwaite Quarry			3.7	9.2	SD112943	1985	GCR	Map
Wan Fell			305.0	753.7	NY524363	1984	NCR	Map
Wart Barrow			25.9	64.1	SD393767	1987		Map
Wasdale Screes			343.1	847.7	NY157046	1987	ESA, GCR, NP, NT, NCR, SAC	Map
Wast Water			297.3	734.7	NY163061	1987	GCR, NP, NCR, SAC	Map
Water Crag			3.6	8.9	SD153973	1997	GCR, NP,	Map
Wedholme Flow			781.8	1,931.8	NY217527	1986	NNR, NCR, SAC	Map
Wet Sleddale Meadows			4.2	10.4	NY553119	1985	SAC	Map
Whitbarrow			1,179.4	2,914.3	SD445871	1990	LNR, WT, NNR, NCR, SAC	Map
Whitberry Burn			0.9	2.3	NY521740	1996	GCR,	Map
White Moss, Crosbymoor			38.0	94.0	NY461606	1986		Map
Whitesike Mine and Flinty Fell			8.2	20.4	NY769426	2000		Map
Wilson Place Meadows			8.9	21.9	NY316031	1989	SAC	Map
Winster Wetlands			40.5	100.0	SD422937	1992	ESA, NP	Map
Yeathouse Quarry			5.3	13.1	NY043168	1990	GCR	Map
Yewbarrow Woods			114.2	282.1	SD349868	1989	SAC	Map
Yewdale Beck			0.7	1.6	SD307985	1997	ESA, GCR, NP	Map

== Notes ==
^{A} Data rounded to one decimal place.
^{B} Grid reference is based on the British national grid reference system, also known as OSGB36, and is the system used by the Ordnance Survey.
^{C} Link to maps using the Nature on the Map service provided by Natural England.

== See also ==
- List of Regionally Important Geological / Geomorphological Sites (RIGS) in Cumbria
