= Combe Scar =

Protected area in Cumbria, England

Coordinates: 54.282114°N 2.4960705°W

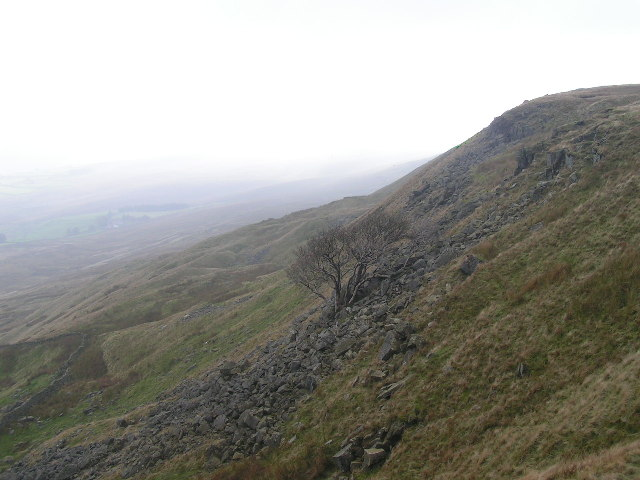
Combe Scar

Combe Scar is a Site of Special Scientific Interest (SSSI) in Cumbria, England. It is within Yorkshire Dales National Park, and is located 1.5km west of the village of Gawthrop. This area is protected because of its geological features and also because of the plant species that grow in rock ledges and in screes.

== Biology ==
Plant species in wet seepage areas on the cliffs include bird's-eye primrose. Plants on cliff ledges include green spleenwort, oak fern, parsley fern, male fern and roseroot.

Below the cliffs are springs where moss species include Cratoneuron commutatum, Bryum pseudotriquetrum, Ctenidium molluscum and Bartramia pomiformis. Plants around these springs include grass-of-Parnassus and common butterwort. Ferns around the streams include brittle bladder-fern and wilson's filmy-fern.

At the base of screes, there are more springs. Here plant species include round-leaved sundew, autumnal hawkbit, bog asphodel, devils-bit scabious, lesser spearwort and marsh arrowgrass. Lesser clubmoss also occurs here. Liverwort species here include Aneura pinguis. Moss species here include Campylium stellatum and Sphagnum warnstorfii.

In dry grasslands, plants include common eyebright and heath bedstraw.

== Geology ==
Combe Scar was formed around the Dent fault that brought rocks from the Silurian period (Ludlow Group, including Coniston Grits and Coniston Flags) into contact with volcanic rocks from the Ordovician period. Within Combe Scar SSSI there is a cirque (an amphitheatre-shaped valley formed by glacial erosion).
