= Baysbrown Wood =

Woodland in Cumbria, England

Coordinates: 54°25′59″N 3°3′33″W

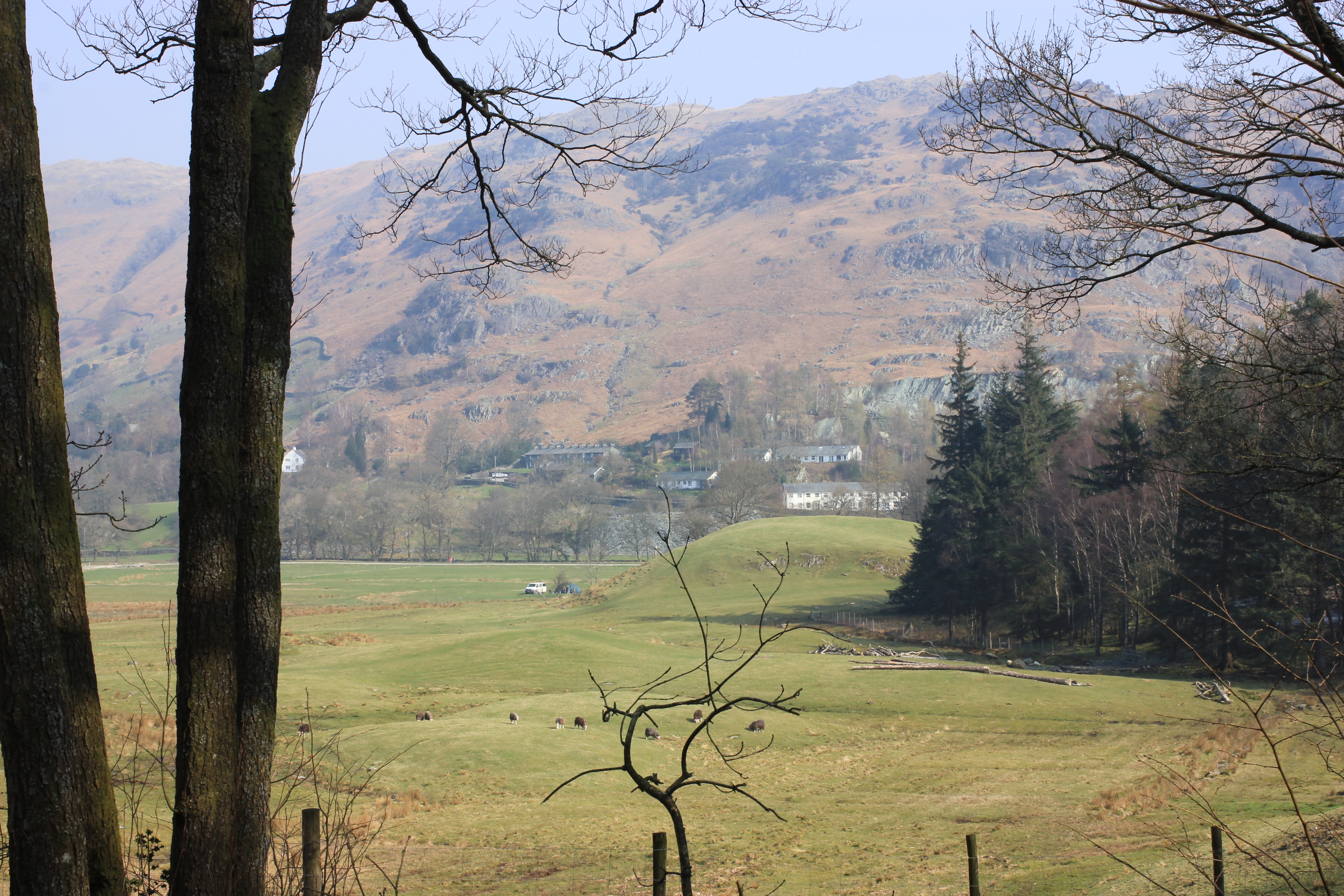
Across to Chapel Stile from Baysbrown Wood

Baysbrown Wood is a Site of Special Scientific Interest (SSSI) near Chapel Stile within the Lake District National Park in Cumbria, England. It is located on the eastern slope of Lingmoor Fell in the Great Langdale valley, 1.5km west of Elterwater. This woodland is protected because of the diversity of moss and liverworts that occur here and because this woodland is home to the Red Squirrel.

This protected area has been visited by the Cumbria Lichen and Bryophyte Group

== Biology ==
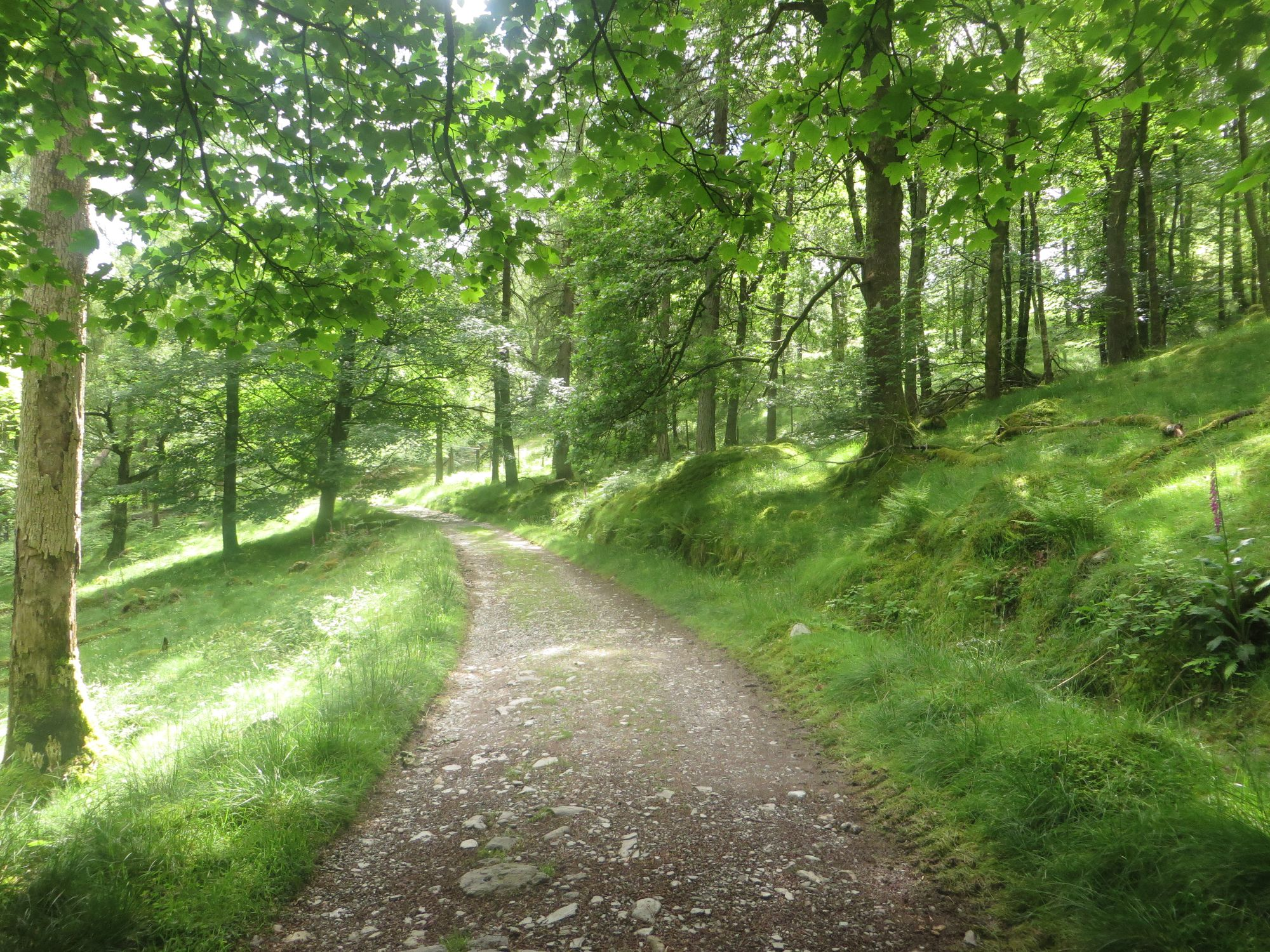
Footpath through Baysbrown Wood

Baysbrown Wood is in a sheltered position, allowing it to support a species composition similar to woods classified as 'western Atlantic' (temperate rainforest). At higher elevations, the dominant tree is pedunculate oak, that occurs alongside hazel shrubs. The understorey here is dominated by mosses, including the moss species Rhytidiadelphus loreus, Polytrichum formosum and Dicranum majus. The understorey here also contains heath bedstraw, bilberry and common cow-wheat.

At lower elevations, ash trees are found alongside pedunculate oak and hazel. In the understorey there are bluebells, primrose, yellow pimpernel and dog violet. Broad buckler-fern also occurs here. At the stream edges, the dominant tree is alder. Stream edge herbaceous plants include lady's mantle, wood anemone and opposite-leaved golden saxifrage. Round-leaved sundew and common spotted orchid are also found in wet areas. Fern species in wet areas include oak fern, beech fern and lady fern. Liverwort species in these wet areas include species from the genera Plagiochila and Scapania, Herbertus and Adelanthus.

Bird species in this woodland include pied flycatcher, wood warbler, willow warbler, redstart, tree pipit and great-spotted woodpecker. Red squirrels have been recorded in this wood.

== Geology ==
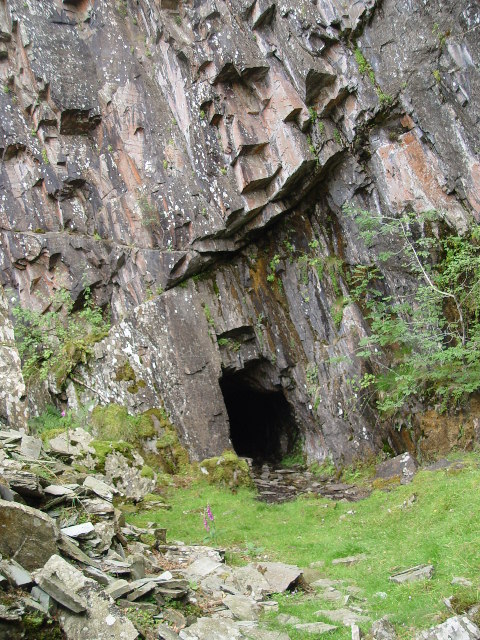
Bank Quarry, Baysbrown Wood

This woodland is situated on Silurian slates and shales.
