= Scales Wood =

Protected area in Cumbria, England

Coordinates: 54.5369°N 3.2905°W

Scales Wood is a Site of Special Scientific Interest (SSSI) within Lake District National Park in Cumbria, England. It is located 900m southwest of the village of Buttermere, alongside the stream that flows between Crummock Water and Buttermere lake. This woodland is protected because of its outstanding diversity of moss and lichen species.

== Biology ==
Scales Wood is dominated by two tree species: birch and sessile oak. Much of the woodland floor is covered by moss species from the genera Polytrichum, Racomitrium and Thuidium. Grass species in these woodlands include sheep's fescue, wavy hair grass and sweet vernal-grass. Herbaceous species include bluebell, wood sorrel and heath bedstraw. Fern species include broad buckler-fern, male-fern, oak fern, polypody and Wilson's filmy-fern.

Liverwort species include Plagiochila spinulosa, Scapania gracilis, Bazzania trilobata. Lichen species include Parmelia saxatilis, Hypogymnia physodes, Sphaerophorus globosus and Baccidia affinis.

Lichens in Scales Wood SSSI have been surveyed by the Cumbria Lichen and Bryophyte group.

== Land ownership ==
Most of the land within Scales Wood SSSI is owned by the National Trust.
