= Crosby Ravensworth Fell =

Protected area in Cumbria, England

Coordinates: 54.491823°N 2.6236550°W

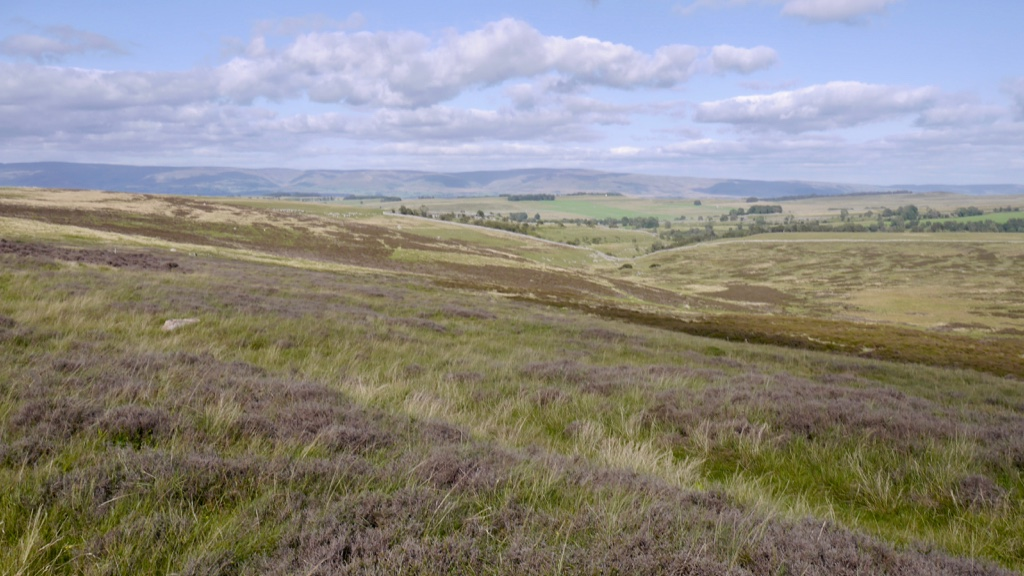
Crosby Ravensworth Fell

Crosby Ravensworth Fell is a Site of Special Scientific Interest (SSSI) in Cumbria, England. It is within Yorkshire Dales National Park and is located 2km southwest of the village of Crosby Ravensworth and adjacent to the hamlet of Oddendale. This area is protected because of the lowland heath habitat and limestone pavement habitats present. The M6 motorway passes through this protected area. Part of the heathland on Crosby Ravensworth Fell SSSI is common land. The protected area includes Seal Howe. The long-distance footpath called the coast to coast walk crosses this protected area.

Crosby Ravensworth Fell SSSI is adjacent to another protected area called Crosby Gill SSSI and so forms part of a wider area of nature protection.

== Biology ==
The heathland on Crosby Ravensworth Fell is a dry acidic heath dominated by the shrub called heather with patches of bilberry. Herbaceous plants include heath bedstraw and tormentil. Moss species in this heathland include Hylocomium splendens, Pleurozium schreberi, Hypnum cupressiforme, Rhytidiadelphus squarrosus and Pseudoscleropodium purum.

There are drainage channels that cross the heathland. In these channels, moss species include Scorpidium revolvens (genus Scorpidium), Ctenidium molluscum, Campylium stellatum, Tortella tortuosa (genus Tortella) and Calliergonella cuspidata. Herbaceous plants include yellow saxifrage , common butterwort , devil's-bit scabious and bird's-eye primrose.

Plants in limestone grassland include wild thyme, common rock-rose, common milkwort, fairy flax, mouse-ear hawkweed, mountain everlasting and limestone bedstraw.

Plants in the limestone pavements include the fern species brittle bladder-fern, green spleenwort, hart's-tongue fern, male fern, wall rue and limestone fern. Herbaceous plants in the limestone pavements include wood anemone, wood sorrel, dog's mercury and sanicle.

Bird species in this protected area include golden plover, red grouse, redshank, oystercatcher, curlew and lapwing.

== Geology ==
The rocks underlying this protected area are Dinantian beds of Carboniferous Limestone.
