= Irthing Gorge =

Protected area in Cumbria and Northumberland, England

- Site of Special Scientific Interest
- Location of Irthing Gorge.
- Area of search: Northumberland
- Grid reference: NY635685
- Coordinates: 55.009710°N 2.5722506°W
- Area: 110 acres (0.45 km^{2}; 0.17 sq mi)
- Notification date: 1984

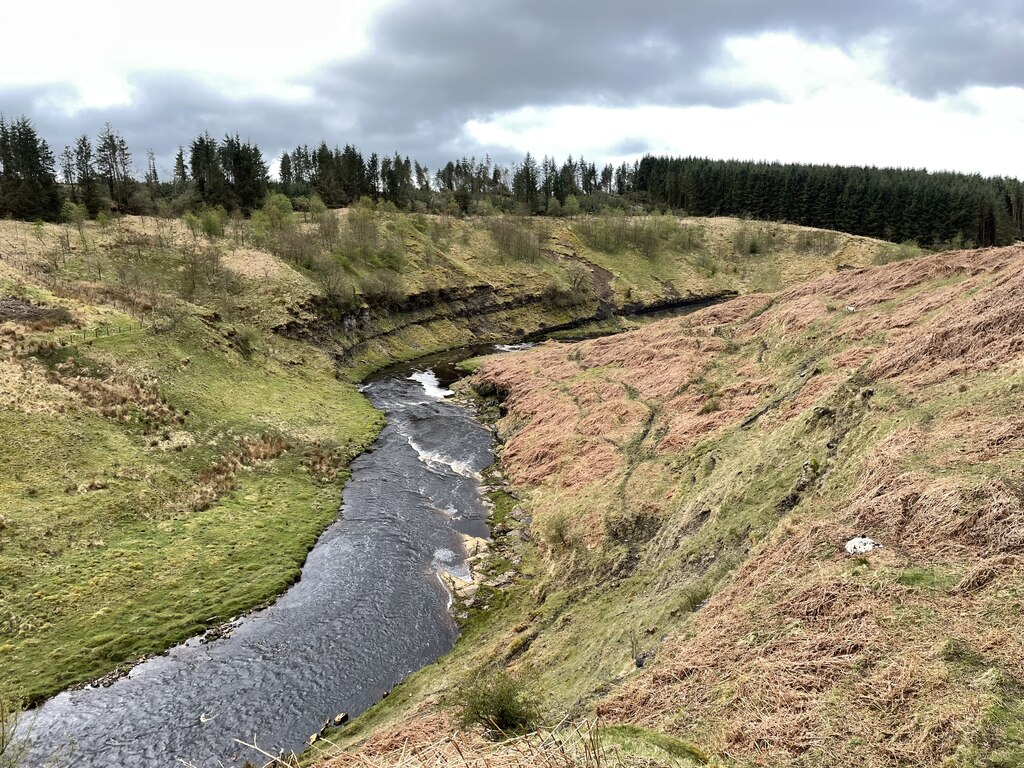
Irthing Gorge

Irthing Gorge is a Site of Special Scientific Interest on the border between the counties of Northumberland and Cumbria, in England. It is located on the south-western boundary of Northumberland National Park where the River Irthing flows near the village of Gilsland. This protected area has an exceptional mixture of habitats, including hillside woodland, seepage areas and bare rock. The gorge here cuts through moorland.

== Details ==
This protected area supports exceptional upland gorge woodland with silver birch and downy birch occurring on higher rockier ground. Yew trees occur on cliff ledges. Ash, sessile oak, wych elm and hazel dominate the lower slopes. Moss species include Mnium hornum and Dicranum majus. Several fern species have been recorded from rock faces including Cystopteris fragilis, Asplenium viride and Polystichum aculeatum. Lichen species recorded here include Lepraria membranacea and Cystocoleus niger.

Plant species in damp seepage areas include limestone bedstraw, yellow saxifrage and the insectivorous plant called butterwort. The variegated horsetail has also been recorded here.

Red squirrels and badgers have been recorded in this gorge. The project Red Squirrels United monitored grey squirrels and red squirrels in Irthing gorge between 2016 and 2020.

== Geology ==
The exposed rocks of the gorge consist of thick beds of sandstone with thinner bands of calcareous shale.

== Land ownership and management ==
Part of the protected area is owned by the Forestry Commission. The Woodland Trust also owns land in this protected area. In 2004 the Woodland Trust planted trees in 13ha of grassland in order to extend the woodland. Woodland management includes control of Rhododendron species.
