= Beech Hill Wood =

Woodland in Cumbria, England

Coordinates: 54°24′38″N 2°46′13″W

Beech Hill Wood is a Site of Special Scientific Interest (SSSI) in Lake District National Park in Cumbria, England. It is located in Longsleddale valley above the River Sprint, 3km northwest of the hamlet of Garnett Bridge. This woodland consists of two separate patches that are protected because of the moss species present. It is on the opposite side of Longsleddale valley to Longsleddale Woods SSSI.

There is another woodland called Beech Hill Wood near Lake Windermere, Cumbria, England, which is owned by the Woodland Trust.

== Geology ==
Beech Hill Wood SSSI is situated on Silurian slates and shales interspersed with bands of calcareous rocks.

== Biology ==
Tree species in Beech Hill Wood SSSI include sessile oak, ash, wych elm, bird cherry and alder. The ground flora includes dog's mercury and enchanter's nightshade. Mosses in the woodland include Neckera crispa and Ctenidium molluscum. On lower slopes hazel is present and the herb layer includes bluebells, water avens, marsh valerian and common valerian.

This protected area includes rocky crags where there are alpine species such as alpine lady's mantle as well as fern species including shield fern, beech fern, brittle bladder fern and Wilson's filmy fern.
