= Duddon Valley Woodlands =

Protected area in Cumbria, England

- Site of Special Scientific Interest
- Location within Cumbria
- Location of Duddon Valley Woodlands.
- Area of search: Cumbria
- Grid reference: SD200940
- Coordinates: 54.335262°N 3.2318559°W
- Area: 888.7 acres (3.6 km^{2}; 1.4 sq mi)
- Notification date: 1994

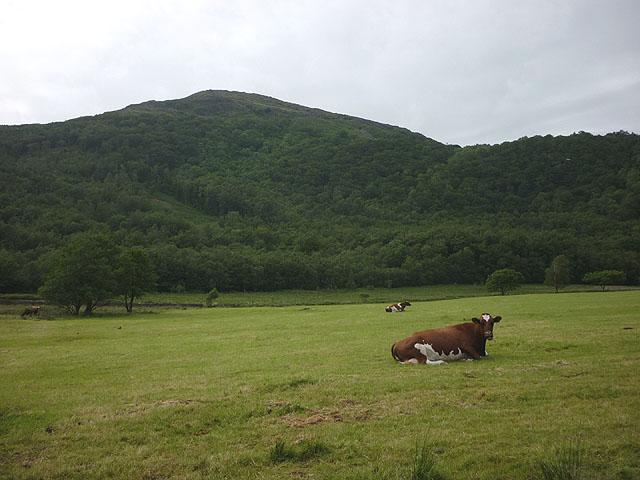
Rainsbarrow Wood

Duddon Valley Woodlands is a Site of Special Scientific Interest within the Lake District National Park in Cumbria, England. This protected area comprises eight large patches of woodland along the valley of the River Duddon. The northernmost part of this protected area is near Seathwaite and southern most at Duddon Bridge. This protected area has an exceptional diversity of moss species and also has a population of the common dormouse.

This protected area includes Tail Bank Wood, Newfield Woods, Wallowbarrow, Lily Wood, Middle Park Wood, Rainsbarrow Wood, Forge Wood and Crook Wood along Duddon Valley.

Within Rainsbarrow Wood there is an individual small-leaved lime estimated to be 400 years old.

== Details ==
Duddon Valley Woodlands are one of the largest series of woodlands in the Lake District. The woodland is in a mosaic of several habitats including flushes, mires and acidic grassland.

On the lower slopes of the valley, the habitat is oak-birch woodland. Herbaceous plants include bluebell and wood sorrel. Fern species on these lower slopes include broad buckler-fern, narrow buckler-fern, scaly male-fern and lady-fern. Moss species on these lower slopes include Rhytidiadelphus squarrosus, Mnium hornum and Thuidium tamariscinum.

On the upper slopes there is oak-birch woodland, but a different composition of herbs and moss species. Moss species on upper slopes include Rhytidiadelphus loreus, Polytrichum formosum, Dicranum majus, Hypnum cupressiforme, Plagiothecium undulatum, Isothecium myosuroides, Leucobryum glaucum and Grimmia retracta. The liverwort Jamesoniella autumnalis has also been recorded in this protected area.

In some of the woodlands there are peat-filled hollows. In these hollows moss species include Sphagnum recurvum and Sphagnum palustre. The plant bog asphodel has also been recorded.

Weevil species associated with dead wood and leaf litter that have been recorded in this protected area include Acalles ptinoides, Caenopsis fissirobris and Trachodes hispidus.

== Land ownership ==
Both the National Trust and the Forestry Commission own land within Duddon Valley Woodlands SSSI (part of Rainsbarrow Wood is owned by the Forestry Commission).
