= Stonethwaite Woods =

Protected area in Cumbria, England

Coordinates: 54.515°N 3.135°W

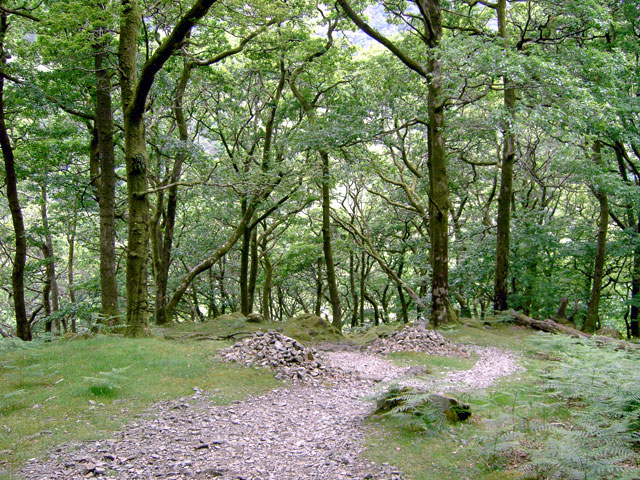
Stonethwaite Woods

Stonethwaite Woods is a Site of Special Scientific Interest (SSSI) within Lake District National Park in Cumbria, England. It consists of two distinct patches located in Borrowdale on either side of Stonethwaite Beck, and either side of the village of Stonethwaite, 1km south of Rosthwaite. This woodland has an exceptional diversity of moss species.

The streams Little Stanger Gill and Big Stanger Gill flow through the southern patch of this protected area.

== Biology ==
Trees in these woodlands include sessile oak and hazel.

=== Northern woodland patch ===
This woodland patch is below Great Crag and is south-facing: parts of the woodland floor of the northern patch are covered in boulder scree which is important habitat for mosses. Moss species amongst scree include Dicranum majus, Rhytidiadelphus loreus and Polytrichum formosum. On lower slopes there are wet areas where herb species include marsh lousewort, marsh violet, round-leaved sundew and marsh arrowgrass.

=== Southern woodland patch ===
This woodland patch is below Rosthwaite fell (Bessyboot) and is north-facing: mosses occur on block scree, boulders and trees. Moss species include Hageniella micans, Ptilium crista-castrensis and Pseudomarsupidium decipiens. Wilson's filmy-fern has been recorded here. Herb species include alpine lady's-mantle, yellow saxifrage and starry saxifrage.

== Land ownership ==
All land within Stonethwaite Woods SSSI is owned by the National Trust.
