= Gelt Woods =

Protected area in Cumbria, England

- Site of Special Scientific Interest
- Location within Cumbria
- Location of Gelt Woods.
- Area of search: Cumbria
- Grid reference: NY527586
- Coordinates: 54.919843°N 2.7394700°W
- Area: 72.2 acres (0.29 km^{2}; 0.11 sq mi)
- Notification date: 1985

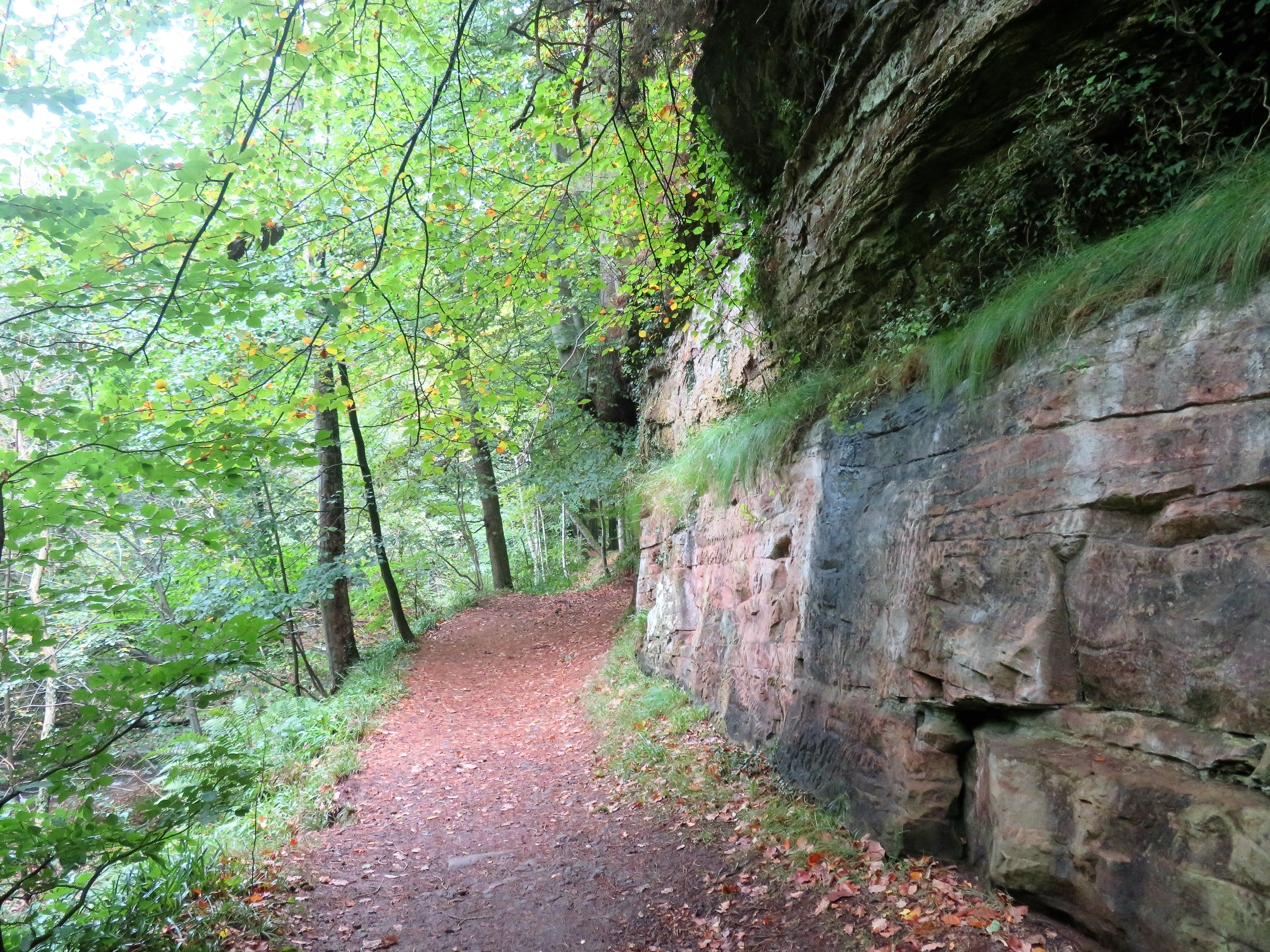
Gelt Woods

Gelt Woods is a Site of Special Scientific Interest (SSSI) in the valley of the River Gelt. It is located 2km south of Brampton, near the village of Low Geltbridge in Cumbria, England. This protected area includes exceptional gorge woodland at a location where the River Gelt has cut through the New Red Sandstone. The area is protected because of the rare species of moss and liverworts and because of the diversity of woodland bird species. Part of the protected area is owned and managed by the Royal Society for the Protection of Birds.

== Details ==
Tree species within Gelt Woods include sessile oak and beech has also been introduced here. Woodland herbs include bilberry, wood sorrel and pignut as well as the ferns broad buckler fern and male fern.

Riverside woodland includes the tree species ash, wych elm and alder. In this riverside woodland include dog's mercury, wood avens, sanicle, wood anemone, woodruff and wood melick. The herbs moschatel, opposite-leaved golden saxifrage and alternate-leaved golden saxifrage are present in wet flushes. In damp areas, beech fern is present and the liverworts Fissidens exiguus and Lepidozia sylvatica have been recorded.

Bird species recorded at Gelt Woods include pied flycatcher, redstart and wood warbler.

== Land ownership ==
Part of the land within Gelt Woods SSSI is owned and managed by the Royal Society for the Protection of Birds.
