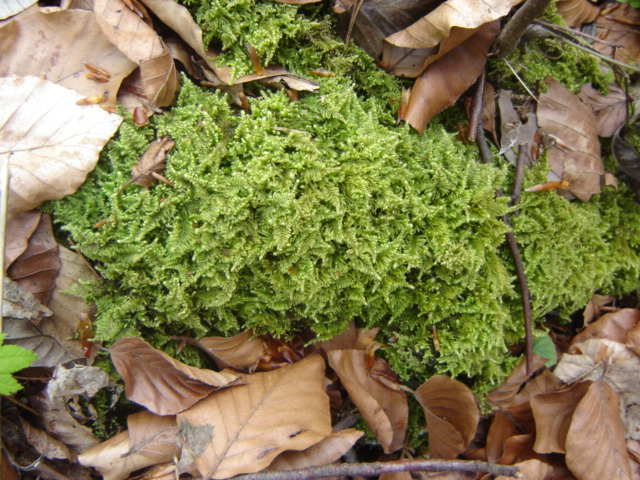
- Ctenidium molluscum

Scientific classification
- Kingdom: Plantae
- Division: Bryophyta
- Class: Bryopsida
- Subclass: Bryidae
- Order: Hypnales
- Family: Hypnaceae
- Genus: Ctenidium (Schimp.) Mitt.

= Ctenidium (plant) =

Genus of mosses

Ctenidium is a genus of mosses belonging to the family Hypnaceae.

The genus was first described by Wilhelm Philippe Schimper.

The genus has cosmopolitan distribution.

Species:

- Ctenidium molluscum Mitten, 1869
- Ctenidium multiseriatum S.He & M.K.Thomas, 2023
