= Lodore–Troutdale Woods =

Protected area in Cumbria, England

Coordinates: 54°32′55″N 3°08′21″W

Lodore–Troutdale Woods is a Site of Special Scientific Interest (SSSI) within the Lake District National Park. It is located 4km south of Keswick and 1km east of Grange in the valley of the River Derwent within Borrowdale. The woodland here has an exceptional diversity of moss species.

This protected area includes Ashness Wood, Lodore Woods, Mossmire Coppice, Troutdale Woods, Grange Crag, Bleacrag Moss, Kings How and High Hows Wood. The streams flowing through this protected area include Comb Gill and Watendlath Beck. The waterfall called Lodore Falls is within this protected area. Parts of this Site of Special Scientific Interest are also included within the Borrowdale Rainforest National Nature Reserve.

== Biology ==
On acidic soils, the dominant tree species are birch and rowan. The Lodore–Troutdale Woods have some of the highest species richness of mosses in England. Liverwort species include Radula voluta, Radula aquilegia, Harpalejeunea ovata and Drepanojeunea hamatifolia. Herb species include meadowsweet, sanicle, primrose and woodruff, as well as yellow saxifrage and fragrant orchid in more open habitats. Fern species include soft shield-fern and forked spleenwort. Lichen species include Anaptychia obscurata. This site has been surveyed by the Cumbria Lichen and Bryophyte group.

== Geology ==
Lodore–Troutdale Woods are situated on rocks from the Borrowdale Volcanic Group and from the Skiddaw Slates Group. Both of these rock types can produce acidic soils.

== Land ownership ==
Part of the land within Lodore–Troutdale Woods is owned by the National Trust.
