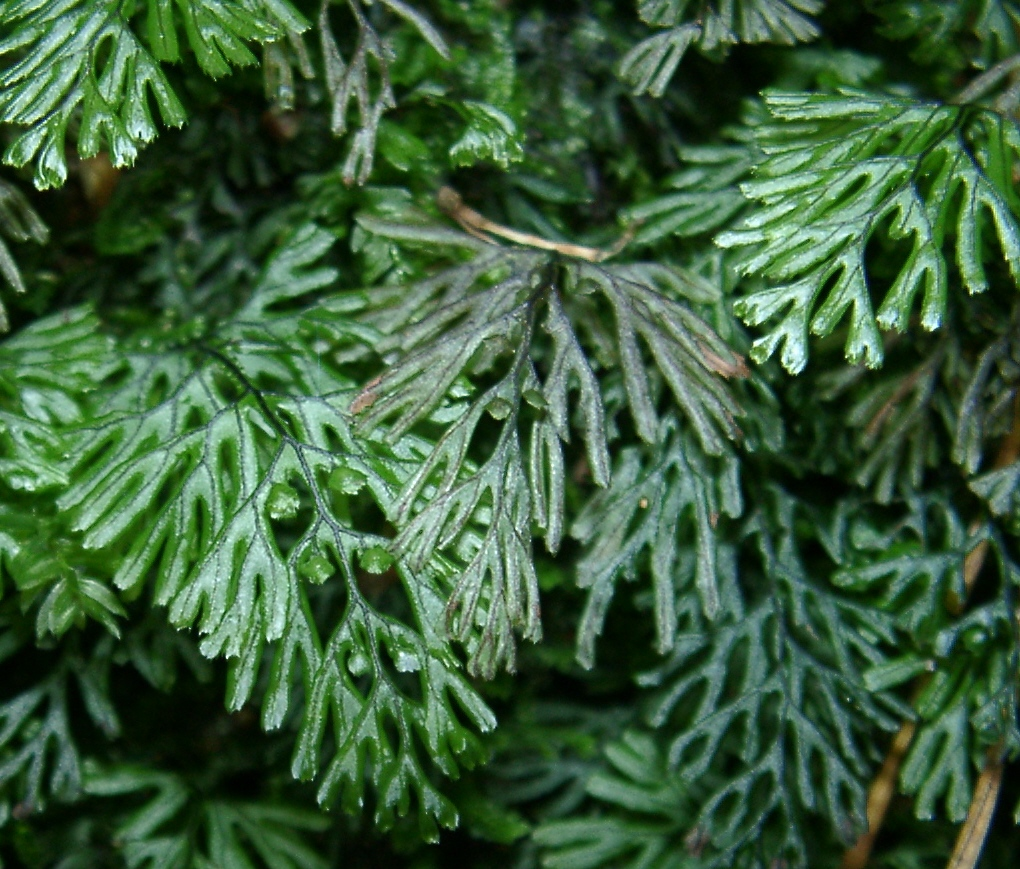

Conservation status
- Least Concern (IUCN 3.1)

- Apparently Secure (NatureServe)

Scientific classification
- Kingdom: Plantae
- Clade: Tracheophytes
- Division: Polypodiophyta
- Class: Polypodiopsida
- Order: Hymenophyllales
- Family: Hymenophyllaceae
- Genus: Hymenophyllum
- Species: H. tunbrigense

Binomial name
- Hymenophyllum tunbrigense (L.) Sm.

Synonyms
- Trichomanes tunbrigense L.

= Hymenophyllum tunbrigense =

Tunbridge filmy fern

Species of fern

Hymenophyllum tunbrigense, the Tunbridge filmy fern or Tunbridge filmy-fern, is a small, fragile perennial leptosporangiate fern which forms large dense colonies of overlapping leaves from creeping rhizomes. The common name derives from the leaves which are very thin, only a single cell thick, and translucent, giving the appearance of a wet film. The evergreen fronds are bipinnatifid, deeply and irregularly dissected, about 3 to 6 cm long, 2 cm across with dark winged stipes. In contrast to the similar H. wilsonii the fronds are more divided, flattened, appressed to the substrate and tend to have a bluish tint.

The fronds are monomorphic and produce sori along the frond segments close to the rachis. Up to 5–10 purse-shaped sori are produced per frond, each covered by two strongly convex, flattened indusial valves. The valve margins are jagged and used to distinguish H. tunbrigense from H. wilsonii, where the edges are entire.

In common with all ferns, H. tunbrigense exhibits a gametophyte stage in its life cycle (alternation of generations) and develops a haploid reproductive prothallus as an independent plant. Information about the gametophyte is scarce but it is likely to be inconspicuous with a narrow ribbon-like thallus. The gametophyte may be able to reproduce itself vegetatively by gemmae in the absence of the sporophyte. Gametophytes of the related Killarney fern (Trichomanes speciosum) have been found outside the geographical range of the sporophyte and this may prove to be true of Hymenophyllum tunbrigense.

== Taxonomy ==
The basionym for the species is Trichomanes tunbrigense, published by Linnaeus in Species Plantarum in 1753, based on material from England and Italy. One of the descriptions he cited was that of James Petiver, who collected it near Tunbridge Wells and described it as Darea tunbrigensis minor, in honor of George Dare who had collected it from the same locality. James Edward Smith, in the third volume of English Botany, transferred it to the genus Hymenophyllum in 1794, based on the two-valved indusium (rather than the tubular indusium of Trichomanes sensu stricto).

== Distribution ==
Apparently worldwide, but discontinuous, in distribution but most frequent in western European oceanic regions like the British Isles. There is uncertainty whether similar plants found in Mexico, the West Indies, Central America, South America, South Africa and Asia should also be included in this species. H. tunbrigense has a similar though distinct distribution to H. wilsonii and can also be found in North America. Its habitat preference may mean that it has been under-recorded in many less-well populated parts of the world.

In continental Europe it occurs much further east than H. wilsonii but these sites are very disjunct and may represent relict populations from a different climatic period. Many of the continental populations are declining or have disappeared in recent times.

The specific name is derived from Royal Tunbridge Wells in Kent, England which was one of its disjunct eastern localities in Britain.

== Ecology and conservation ==
Filmy ferns (Hymenophyllum species, Trichomanes species) are very vulnerable to desiccation which limits the habitats in which they can survive. Hymenophyllum species are dependent as much, or more, upon the microclimate of a site as the macroclimate. H. tunbrigense is usually associated with rock outcrops, especially when deep fissures or crevices are present.

Hymenophyllum tunbrigense appears not to reproduce effectively from spores under present environmental conditions. Gametophytes have not been identified in the field although there is circumstantial evidence that sexual reproduction does take place.

== Cultivation and uses ==
While there are records of its cultivation (Harold Stuart Thompson grew a specimen from Somerset in a bell jar in his bedroom for a decade), it is not generally cultivated. It is propagated at Kew Gardens for reestablishment in suitable habitat.
