= Milkingstead Wood =

Protected area in Cumbria, England

- Site of Special Scientific Interest
- Location within Cumbria
- Location of Milkingstead Wood.
- Area of search: Cumbria
- Grid reference: SD153996
- Coordinates: 54.385°N 3.306°W
- Area: 34.5 acres (0.14 km^{2}; 0.054 sq mi)
- Notification date: 1986

Milkingstead Wood is a Site of Special Scientific Interest (SSSI) within the Lake District National Park in Cumbria, England. It is located 1km south east of Eskdale Green in the valley of the River Esk (Eskdale). This site is important because of the fern species present.

This site used to be part of Dalegarth Force and Woods SSSI.

== Biology ==
The woodland has a variety of different tree species including pedunculate oak, downy birch, alder and rowan. Oak trees in this woodland were probably historically managed using coppicing. The woodland floor is also varied and includes dry rocky outcrops and also wet peat.

Fern species include Tunbridge filmy fern, lemon scented fern, male fern, buckler fern and beech fern. Moss species include the large rounded hummocks of Leucobryum glaucum. Herb species in this protected area include common cow-wheat, white climbing fumitory, greater stitchwort, bluebell, wood sorrel and heath spotted orchid.

== Geology ==
The rocks underlying Milkingstead Wood are granite (referred to as Eskdale Granite) and this rock type forms vertical cliffs within this protected area.

== Land ownership ==
All of the land within Milkingstead Wood SSSI is owned by the National Trust.
