= Glencoyne Wood =

Protected area in Cumbria, England

- Site of Special Scientific Interest
- Location within Cumbria
- Location of Glencoyne Wood.
- Area of search: Cumbria
- Grid reference: NY385180
- Coordinates: 54.553490°N 2.9523793°W
- Area: 76.1 acres (0.31 km^{2}; 0.12 sq mi)
- Notification date: 1986

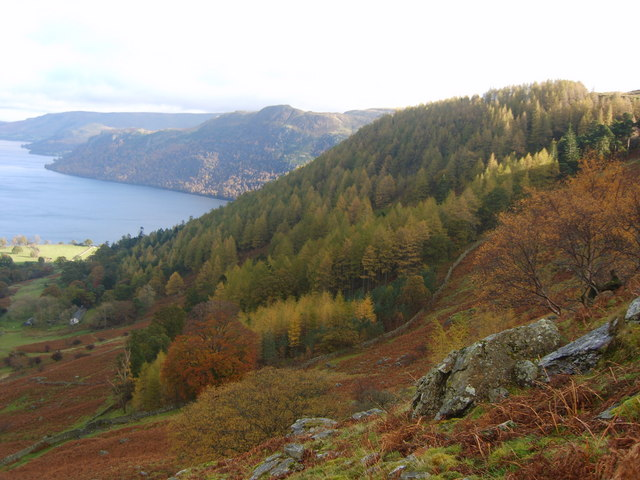
Glencoyne Wood

Glencoyne Wood is a Site of Special Scientific Interest (SSSI) in Lake District National Park in Cumbria, England. This protected area is located near the village of Glenridding near Ullswater lake. This woodland is protected because of the exceptional diversity of mosses and liverworts. Red squirrel has been recorded in this woodland.

== Biology ==
In acidic soils, sessile oak is the dominant canopy tree. The woodland has widely spaced trees as regeneration is inhibited by sheep grazing. Woodland herbs in this protected area include moschatel, sanicle, woodruff and opposite-leaved golden-saxifrage. Common butterwort has been recorded on Stybarrow Pass.

This protected area supports 66 different species of mosses and liverworts. Moss species include Ptilium crista-castrensis. Liverworts include the epiphytic species Lejeunea ulicina and Scapania umbrosa as well as Bazzania trilibata on tree stumps and leafy liverworts on fallen decaying trees (Norwellia curviflora, Aneura palmata, Scapania umbrosa and Sphenolobus helleranus). Moss species in rocky habitats include Orthothecium rufescens, Neckera crispa, Ctenidium molluscum, Tortella tortuosa and Bartramia hallerana. Liverworts on rocks include Rhabdoweissia crenulata and Thuidium delicatulum.

Insect species include Calosoma inquisitor and the snowflea Boreus hyemalis. Moth species include Venusia humeralis, Stilbia anomala and Telphusa humeralis.

Bird species include pied flycatcher, spotted flycatcher, redstart, willow warbler, wood warbler, garden warbler, siskin, great spotted woodpecker, tawny owl, common sandpiper and hawfinch.

== Geology ==
The woodland is situated on rocks from the Borrowdale Volcanic Series. These rocks weather to give acidic soils with local enrichment where calcite bands occur in the rock.

== Land ownership ==
Part of the land within Glencoyne Wood SSSI is owned by the National Trust.
