= Seatoller Wood, Sourmilk Gill & Seathwaite Graphite Mine =

Protected area in Cumbria, England

- Site of Special Scientific Interest
- Location within Cumbria
- Location of Seatoller Wood, Sourmilk Gill & Seathwaite Graphite Mine.
- Area of search: Cumbria
- Grid reference: NY235128
- Coordinates: 54.508°N 3.180°W
- Area: 335.0 acres (1.4 km^{2}; 0.52 sq mi)
- Notification date: 1984

Seatoller Wood, Sourmilk Gill & Seathwaite Graphite Mine is a Site of Special Scientific Interest (SSSI) within Lake District National Park on the slopes above Seathwaite in Borrowdale, the valley of the River Derwent. The woodland is exceptional because of the lichen and liverwort species found there and the Red Squirrels that live there.

== Biology ==
Tree species in Seatoller Wood include sessile oak, ash and wych elm. More than 180 species of lichens have been found in this wood including Lobaria pulmonaria, Hypotrachyna laevigata and species from the genera Arthothelium, Bacidia, Leptogium and Lopadium (Arthothelium orbilliferum, Sticta canariensis, Leptogium burgessii and Lopadium pezizoideum). Liverwort species are from the genera Radula and Adelanthus. Moss species include Hylocomium umbratum and Leucobryum juniperoideum. Wilson's filmy fern has also been recorded here.

== Geology ==
Rock outcrops are from the Borrowdale Volcanic Group from the Ordovician period and show evidence of how volcanic rocks have been transported by streams. Seathwaite Graphite Mine is an important site for understanding mineralisation of graphite.

== Land ownership ==
All the land within Seatoller Wood, Sourmilk Gill & Seathwaite Graphite Mine SSSI is owned by the National Trust.
