= Birk Fell =

Protected area in Cumbria, England

Coordinates: 54°33′17″N 2°55′28″W

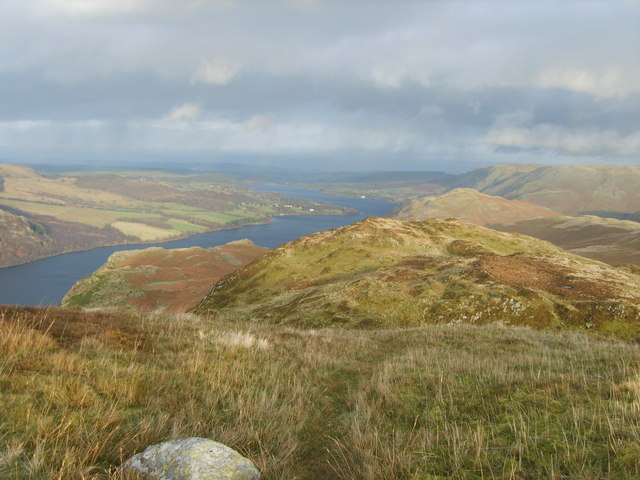
Ullswater from Birk Fell

Birk Fell is a Site of Special Scientific Interest (SSSI) in Lake District National Park in Cumbria, England. It is located 2 kilometres (1.2 mi) north of Patterdale, covering 2.66 square kilometres (1.03 sq mi) on the eastern side of Ullswater. Birk Fell SSSI includes the shoreline with Ullswater at Silver Point and Silver Bay as well as the summit of Bleaberry Knott. The eastern boundary of this protected area follows the stream called Scalehow Beck. This area is protected because of the population of juniper trees that occur here. There are scree slopes in this protected area.

This protected area also includes Dalemain Estates woodland. The boundaries of Birk Fell SSSI are contiguous with the boundaries of River Eden and Tributaries SSSI, and so is part of a wider area of nature protection.

== Biology ==
Alongside the juniper trees are the tree species silver-birch, rowan, ash, bird cherry, holly, hawthorn and downy birch. Woodland herbaceous species include wood sorrel, yellow pimpernel and harebell. Oak fern is also found in the woodland. There are damp rocky outcrops where fern species include maidenhair spleenwort, polypody and Wilson's filmy-fern.

On the scree slopes, plants include parsley fern and alpine lady's mantle.

At higher altitudes there is heathland, rock outcrops and blanket bog. Plants include lingonberry, bilberry, bell heather and crowberry. Round-leaved sundew occurs in the small blanket bogs.

== Geology ==
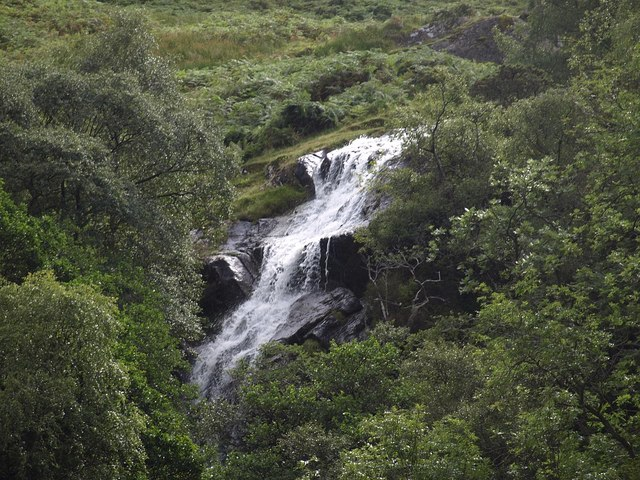
Scalehow Force

Two waterfalls along the length of Scalehow Beck indicate fault lines in the underlying rocks of the Borrowdale Volcanic Group.
