= Thirlmere Woods =

Protected site in Cumbria, England

- Site of Special Scientific Interest
- Location within Cumbria
- Location of Thirlmere Woods.
- Area of search: Cumbria
- Grid reference: NY313188
- Coordinates: 54.559750°N 3.0638672°W
- Area: 114.2 acres (0.4622 km^{2}; 0.1784 sq mi)
- Notification date: 1987

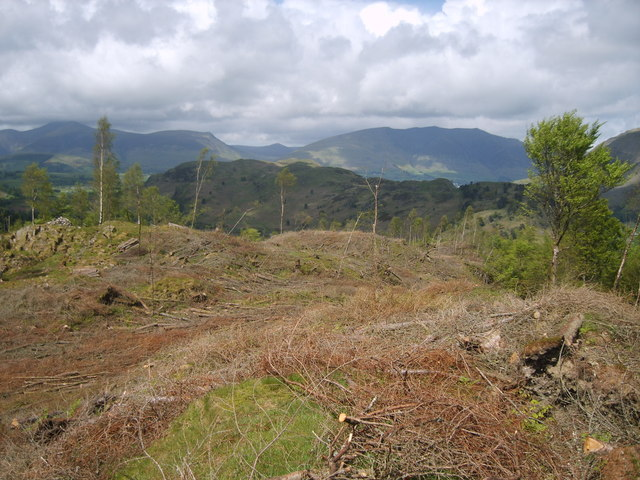
The summit of Great How

Thirlmere Woods is a Site of Special Scientific Interest (SSSI) within Lake District National Park in Cumbria, England. This protected area is located at the northern end of the Thirlmere reservoir, near the village of Legburthwaite.

The protected area includes Great How Wood, The Benn and Bull Crag Wood.

== Details ==
Thirlmere Woods includes areas of ancient woodland with a high diversity of moss species on the woodland floor (see Celtic rainforest). Moss species include specialists of atlantic woodland, including Ptilium crista-castrensis, Dicranodontium denudatum and Sphagnum quinquefarium. Liverwort species include Anastrepta orcadensis.

In a region of the site called Launchy Gill, there are plants suited to damp areas including water avens (Geum rivale) and Wilson's filmy-fern (Hymenophyllum wilsonii). Orthilia secunda has also been found here. Here there are also liverwort species from the genus Metzgeria.

== Land ownership ==
Part of the land designated as Thirlmere Woods SSSI is owned by United Utilities. United Utilities have been working with the not-for-profit organisation Cumbria Woodlands to undertake woodland restoration around Thirlmere reservoir.
