= Greendale Mires =

Protected area in Cumbria, England

Coordinates: 54.44°N 3.31°W

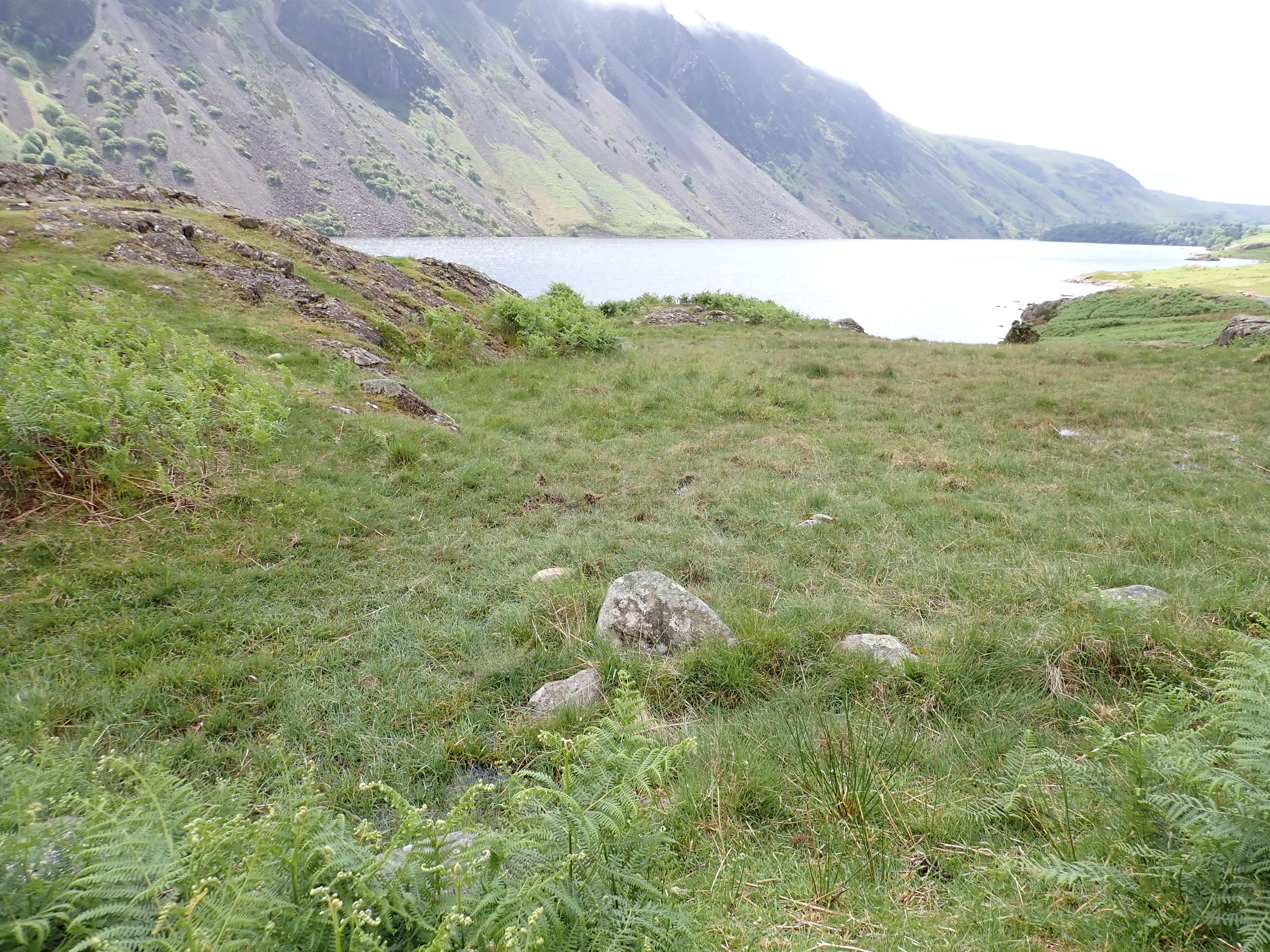
Greendale Mire: Wet seepage area near the edge of Wast Water

Greendale Mires is a Site of Special Scientific Interest (SSSI) in the Lake District National Park in Cumbria, England. It is located near the hamlet of Greendale on the western side of Wast Water, beneath Buckbarrow fell. This protected area has exceptional peatland habitat.

The streams Smithy Beck and Countess Beck flow through this protected area.

== Details ==
The mires over deep peat at Greendale Mires are nationally important. Plant species in this protected area include common sundew, cross-leaved heath, devil's-bit scabious, bog lousewort, cranberry and bog asphodel. The plants bogbean, bog pondweed, marsh pennywort and marsh St Johns-wort occur in pools of water. Intermediate bladderwort and long leaved sundew have also been recorded here.

== Land ownership ==
Most of the land within Greendale Mires SSSI is owned by the National Trust.

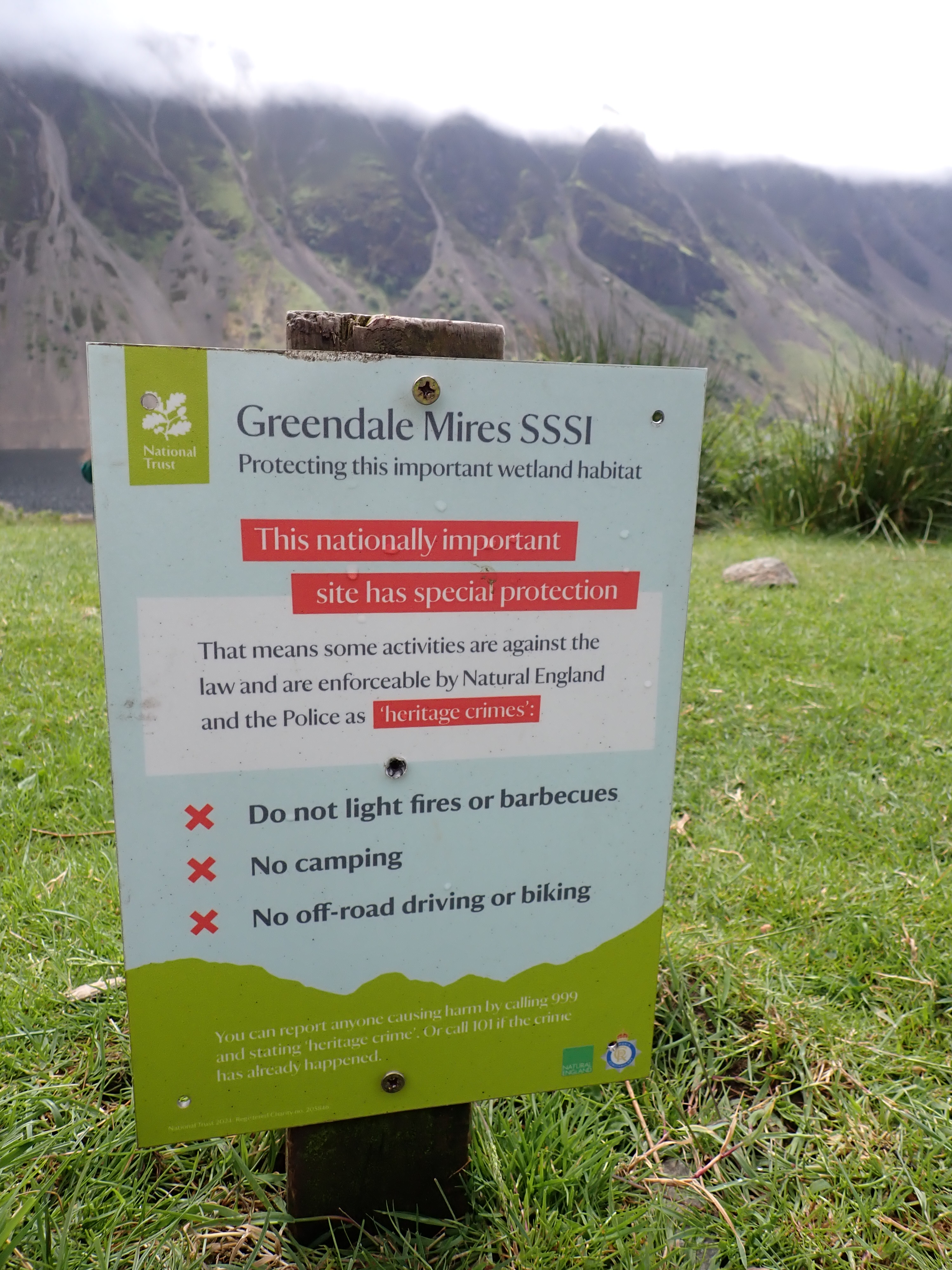
National Trust Sign at Greendale Mires
