= Naddle Forest =

Protected area in Cumbria, England

- Site of Special Scientific Interest
- Location within Cumbria
- Location of Naddle Forest.
- Area of search: Cumbria
- Grid reference: NY495145
- Coordinates: 54°31′30″N 2°46′48″W
- Area: 1,251.3 acres (5.1 km^{2}; 2.0 sq mi)
- Notification date: 1986

Naddle Forest is a Site of Special Scientific Interest (SSSI) within the Lake District National Park in Cumbria, England. It is located on either side of the northern section of Haweswater reservoir, near the villages; Burnbanks and Bampton.

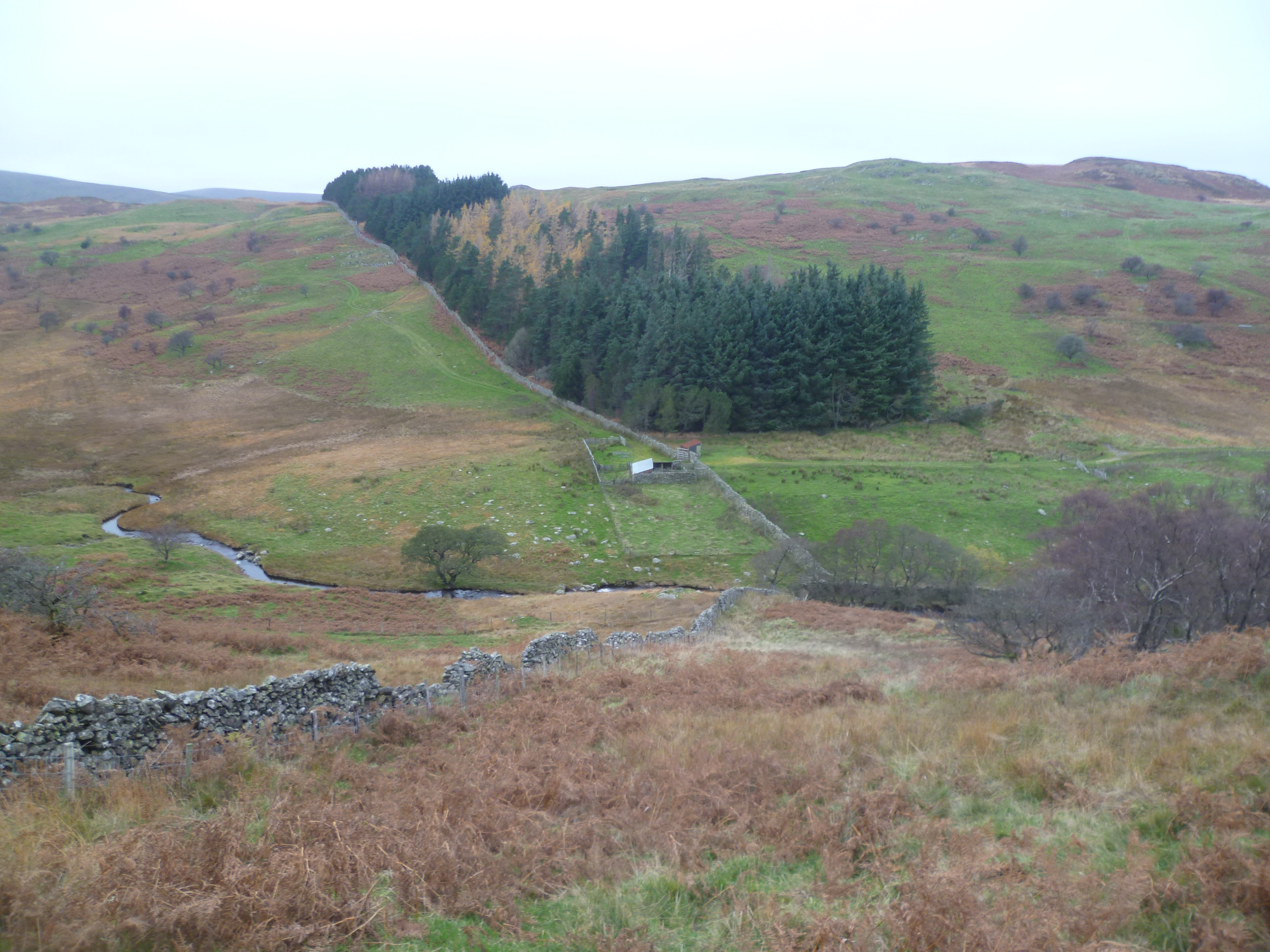
Naddle Forest

Naddle Forest SSSI includes Low Forest, Guerness Wood, High Forest and Mirkside. The protected area includes Wallow Crag.

== Details ==
Naddle Forest SSSI is situated on steep slopes, comprises sections of semi-natural deciduous woodland with a continental composition of mosses and lichens. Red squirrels are found here. Non-wooded areas include areas dominated by juniper. Naddle Forest is noted for its lichen species, including Lobaria pulmonaria. Moss species include Ptilium crista-castrensis.

Low Forest and Guerness Wood are dominated by sessile oak trees. Ferns here include Dryopteris filix-mas and Polystichum lonchitis. Plant species include sanicle (Sanicula europea) and the grass species wood fescue (Festuca altissima). Parts of the woodland are carpeted by bluebells.

High Forest and Mirkside are dominated by ash and hazel. The plant species here include water avens and golden saxifrage.

== Land ownership ==
Most of the area designated as Naddle Forest SSSI is owned by United Utilities.
