= Beckfoot Quarry =

Protected area in Cumbria, England

- Site of Special Scientific Interest
- Location within Cumbria
- Location of Beckfoot Quarry.
- Area of search: Cumbria
- Grid reference: NY164003
- Coordinates: 54.391289°N 3.2889782°W
- Area: 4 acres (0.016 km^{2}; 0.0063 sq mi)
- Notification date: 1985

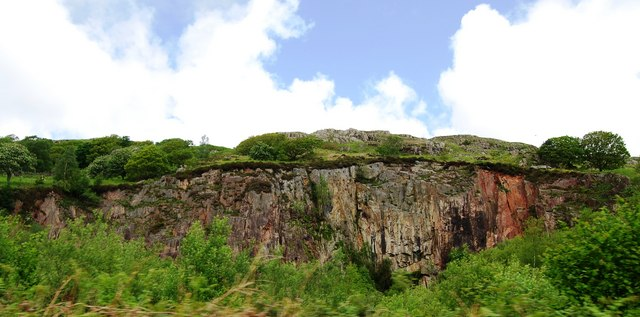
Beckfoot Quarry

Beckfoot Quarry is a Site of Special Scientific Interest (SSSI) within Lake District National Park in Cumbria, England. It is located between Beckfoot and Eskdale, near to the River Esk and near the Ravenglass & Eskdale railway.

== Details ==
This quarry is protected because it contains an exposure of a pink perthite granite dated from the Ordovician age. Perthite granite is an igneous rock.

== Land ownership ==
All of the land within Beckfoot Quarry SSSI is owned by the National Trust.
