= Scawgill and Blaze Beck =

Protected area in Cumbria, England

Coordinates: 54°37′03″N 3°16′22″W

Scawgill and Blaze Beck is a Site of Special Scientific Interest (SSSI) within the Lake District National Park in Cumbria, England. It is located 2km east of Lorton on the western side of Whinlatter Pass. This protected area consists of two quarries and a stream gorge. The fossil graptolites found here make this an exceptional site for understanding the geological stratigraphy of Ordovician rocks.

The quarries are either side of the stream called Blaze Beck.

== Geology ==
Mudstones from the Skiddaw Group at Scawgill and Blaze Beck contain fossils of graptolites from the genus Didymograptus.

== Land ownership ==
Part of the land within Scawgill and Blaze Beck SSSI is owned by the Forestry Commission.
