= Gowbarrow Park =

Protected area in Cumbria, England

- Site of Special Scientific Interest
- Location within Cumbria
- Location of Gowbarrow Park.
- Area of search: Cumbria
- Grid reference: NY415208
- Coordinates: 54.575°N 2.910°W
- Area: 133.4 acres (53.99 ha)
- Notification date: 1986

Gowbarrow Park is a Site of Special Scientific Interest (SSSI) in Lake District National Park in Cumbria, England. It is located on the lower slopes of Gowbarrow Fell and borders Ullswater lake. It is 2 km from the hamlet of Dockray. This protected area has an outstanding diversity of lichen species. Red squirrels have been recorded in this protected area.

== Biology ==
Tree species in Gowbarrow Park include wych-elm and alder, some of which has been coppiced. The shrub spindle is present here at the northern limit of its range in England. Herb species include brooklime, birds-eye primrose and grass-of-parnassus.

A total of 126 lichen species have been recorded from Gowbarrow Park. Lichens in the wych-elm woodland include Bacidia rubella, Lobaria pulmonaria, Lobaria laetevirens and Lobaria amplissima. The lichens Lithographa dendrographa and Rinodina isioides are also found in this protected area.

Bird species in this protected area include buzzard, sparrowhawk, pied flycatcher, ring ouzel, redstart, wood warbler and willow warbler.

== Geology ==
Outcrops in Gowbarrow Park are from the Borrowdale Volcanic Series and the rocks vary from strongly acidic to calcareous.

== Land ownership ==
All of the land within Gowbarrow Park SSSI is owned by the National Trust.
