= Alston Shingle Banks =

Protected area in Cumbria, England

Coordinates: 54.797266°N 2.4448115°W

Alston Shingle Banks is a Site of Special Scientific Interest (SSSI) in Cumbria, England. It is located in the valley of the headwaters of the River Tyne, 1 km south of the town of Alston. This area is protected because of the diversity of plant communities on the landforms made by streams and because of the presence of plants that are tolerant of heavy metals.

== Biology ==
The shifting channels of the streams at this site provide a dynamic environment where different stages of plant community ecological succession can be seen.

On exposed pebble shingle that is deposited by the streams, lichen species have been recorded from the genus Peltigera. Herbaceous plant species in this exposed habitat include coltsfoot and wall lettuce.

Where soils have started form in the river channel, there are herbaceous plants tolerant of lime and also herbaceous plants tolerant of heavy metals. Plants tolerant of lime include wild thyme, lady's bedstraw and limestone bedstraw. Plants tolerant of heavy metals include thrift, spring sandwort and alpine pennycress. These plant communities are referred to as calaminarian grassland and have been influenced by the history of lead mines around Alston that have increased the levels of heavy metals in the soils.

Marsh vegetation is also present where plant species include water-cress and marsh willowherb.
