= Yewdale Beck =

River in Cumbria, England

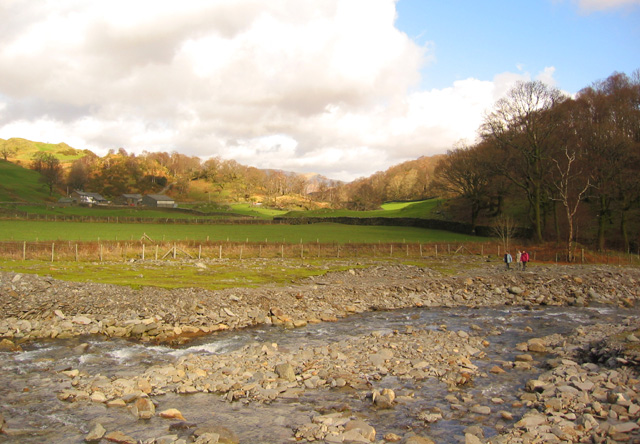

Location
- Country: England
- County: Cumbria
- District: Lake District

Physical characteristics
- Source
  - location: east of Wetherlam
- Mouth
  - location: Coniston Water
  - coordinates: 54°21′53″N 3°3′47″W

Yewdale Beck is a river in Lake District, Cumbria, England. The Yewdale Beck arises from the confluence of Henfoot Beck and Swallow Scar Beck, as well as other unnamed tributaries east of Wetherlam. The Yewdale Beck first flows in an easterly direction before it turns south-west of the settlement of Lower Tilberthwaite, which it changes again at the northern edge of the town of Coniston to the southeast. It then flows into the Coniston Water.

The Yewdale Beck is a Site of Special Scientific Interest. The watercourse is one of the best places for studying stratigraphy and paleogeography of the early Silurian in Great Britain.
