= Ashgill Quarry =

Protected area in Cumbria, England

- Site of Special Scientific Interest
- Location within Cumbria
- Location of Ashgill Quarry.
- Area of search: Cumbria
- Grid reference: SD278970
- Coordinates: 54.363384°N 3.1126511°W
- Area: 382.8 acres (1.5 km^{2}; 0.60 sq mi)
- Notification date: 1987

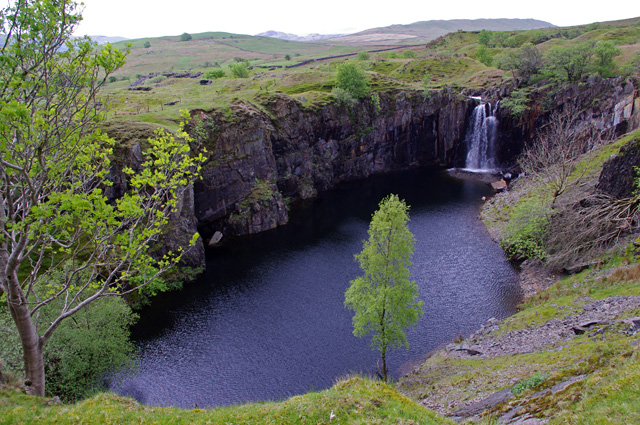
Banishead Quarry, within Ashgill Quarry SSSI

Ashgill Quarry is a Site of Special Scientific Interest within Lake District National Park in Cumbria, England. It is located near Coniston Water, near the village of Torver on the slopes of the mountain called the Old Man of Coniston. This protected area is important for the Ordovician rocks exposed here. The protected area includes several quarries (including Banishead Quarry and Eddy Scale Quarry)

The Tranearth climbing hut, premises of the Lancashire Climbing and Caving Club, is located within this protected area.

== Details ==
Geological strata within this protected area span the Ordovician - Silurian boundary. The quarry exposes the uppermost parts of the Dent group. Graptolite fossils (including Glyptograptus persculptus) in this protected area are important indicators for different geological strata. Several species of trilobite have been found in this protected area, including Mucronaspis mucronata. Brachipod fossils have also been recorded from this protected area, including species dated to the Hirnantian stage.

== Land ownership ==
Part of the land within Ashgill Quarry SSSI is owned by the National Trust.
