= Eden Gorge =

Protected area in Cumbria, England

- Site of Special Scientific Interest
- Location of Eden Gorge.
- Area of search: Cumbria
- Grid reference: NY525430
- Coordinates: 54.779648°N 2.7400190°W
- Area: 359.5 acres (1.5 km^{2}; 0.56 sq mi)
- Notification date: 1986

Eden Gorge is a Site of Special Scientific Interest (SSSI) including a 5km length of the valley of the River Eden between Armathwaite and Lazonby in Cumbria, England. This protected area spans between the Settle-Carlisle railway track on the western side to Coombs Wood Forestry Commission site on the eastern side. The protected area includes 30m high cliffs where the River Eden has eroded through New Red Sandstone. The semi-natural woodland is apparently a remnant of the ancient Inglewood forest.

== Details ==
In the gorge, woodland tree species include sessile oak, birch and hazel. Ground cover in these woodlands include bilberry and a diversity of moss species, with herbs including yellow star-of-Bethlehem. In wetter areas, herbs include marsh hawk's-beard, moschatel, meadow saxifrage and alternate-leaved golden-saxifrage. A diversity of liverworts have been recorded in this protected area including Harpanthus scutatus, Bazzania trilobata, Microlejeunea uliana and Saccogyna viticulosa.

Between the railway and the gorge woodland, there are grassland habitats that contain herbs such as petty whin and dyer's greenweed.

Insect species include the timber-feeding beetles Saperda scalaris and Stenostola ferrea. Bird species include common sandpiper, woodcock, pied flycatcher and wood warbler. Red squirrel and otter have been recorded in this protected area.

Just south of Armathwaite, beside the River Eden, there are five carvings of human faces carved in the sandstone cliff.

== Land ownership ==
Two major institutional landowners that own land within Eden Gorge SSSI are the Forestry Commission and Network Rail.
