= Environmentally sensitive area =

An environmentally sensitive area (ESA) is a type of designation for an agricultural area which needs special protection because of its landscape, wildlife or historical value. The scheme was introduced in 1987. Originally it was administered by Ministry of Agriculture, Fisheries and Food, then the Rural Development Service for the United Kingdom Governments Department for Environment, Food and Rural Affairs, and currently Natural England following successive re-organisation of the departments. In 2005 the scheme was superseded by Environmental Stewardship and closed to new entrants. Existing agreements remain active until they expire, meaning the designation will remain active until 2014.

Farmers entered into a 10-year contract with the government and received an annual payment for the area that is part of the scheme. Farmers were expected to adopt environmentally friendly agricultural practices.

There are 22 ESAs in England:

- Avon Valley
- Blackdown Hills
- Breckland
- Broads
- River Clun
- Cotswold Hills
- Dartmoor
- Essex Coast
- Exmoor
- Lake District
- North Kent Marshes
- North Peak
- Pennine Dales
- Shropshire Hills
- Somerset Levels and Moors
- South Downs
- South Wessex Downs
- South West Peak
- Suffolk River Valleys
- Test Valley
- Upper Thames Tributaries
- West Penwith

There are 10 ESAs in Scotland

- Breadalbane
- Loch Lomond
- Machair (Western Isles)
- Stewartry
- Central Borders (inc Whitlaw Eildon)
- Central Uplands
- Western Uplands
- Cairngorm Straths
- Shetland Islands
- Argyll Islands

== See also ==
- Countryside Stewardship Scheme
- Environmental stewardship
- Area of Outstanding Natural Beauty (AONB)
- Site of Special Scientific Interest (SSSI)
- Special Area of Conservation (SAC)
- Special protection area (SPA)
- Nitrate sensitive area (NSA)
