= High Lickbarrow =

Coordinates: 54.3685°N 2.8959°W

High Lickbarrow is a farm near Windermere in the Lake District of England. It was farmed in a traditional manner by Elizabeth Bottomley, who maintained a herd of rare Blue Albion cattle. Her brother, who lived there too, was the architect and artist Eric Michael Bottomley, and when he died in 2015, he left it to the National Trust to preserve its character. The farm's mires and pastures are a Site of Special Scientific Interest because the grazing of the cattle, rather than sheep, left a greater diversity of vegetation.
