= Thurstonfield Lough =

Lake in Cumbria, England

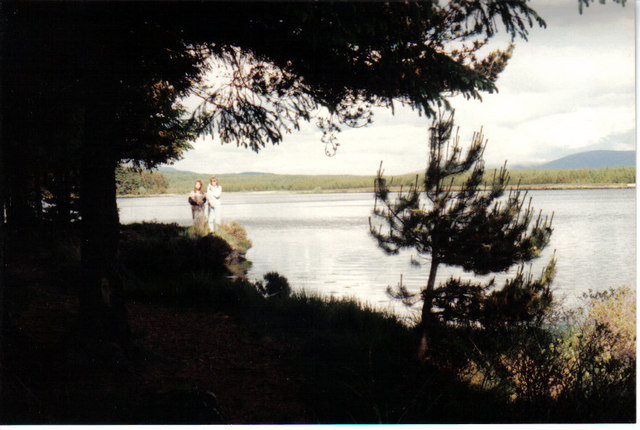
- The Lough

- Location in Cumbria, England Location in the former Carlisle district, Cumbria
- Location: Cumbria, England
- Coordinates: 54.897°N 3.062°W
- Type: Freshwater
- Basin countries: United Kingdom
- Max. length: 1 mi (1.6 km)
- Max. width: 1 mi (1.6 km)
- Average depth: 2,743.2 m (9,000 ft)
- Max. depth: 1 ft (0.30 m)
- Settlements: Carlisle

Thurstonfield Lough is an open water lough near Carlisle, Cumbria, and a Site of Special Scientific Interest.
