= Wet Sleddale Meadows =

Protected area in Cumbria, England

- Site of Special Scientific Interest
- Location within Cumbria
- Location of Wet Sleddale Meadows.
- Area of search: Cumbria
- Grid reference: NY 554119
- Coordinates: 54°30′4″N 2°41′25″W
- Area: 10.6 acres (0.043 km^{2}; 0.017 sq mi)
- Notification date: 1985

Wet Sleddale Meadows is a Site of Special Scientific Interest within Lake District National Park.

== Description ==
It is located in Cumbria, England, 3 kilometres (2 mi) south of Shap village and 300 metres (980 ft) northeast of Wet Sleddale Reservoir.

Wet Sleddale Meadows is a hay meadow grassland that has a high diversity of plant species including oxeye daisy (Leucanthemum vulgare), pignut (Conopodium majus) and three species of lady's-mantle (Alchemilla filicaulis, Alchemilla xanthochlora and Alchemilla glabra). Dactylorhiza maculata and Succisa pratensis are also present.

Part of the land area designated as Wet Sleddale Meadows is owned by United Utilities.
