= Helbeck Wood =

Protected area in Cumbria, England

- Site of Special Scientific Interest
- Location within Cumbria
- Location of Helbeck Wood.
- Area of search: Cumbria
- Grid reference: NY785164
- Coordinates: 54.542°N 2.334°W
- Area: 221.1 acres (0.89 km^{2}; 0.35 sq mi)
- Notification date: 1984

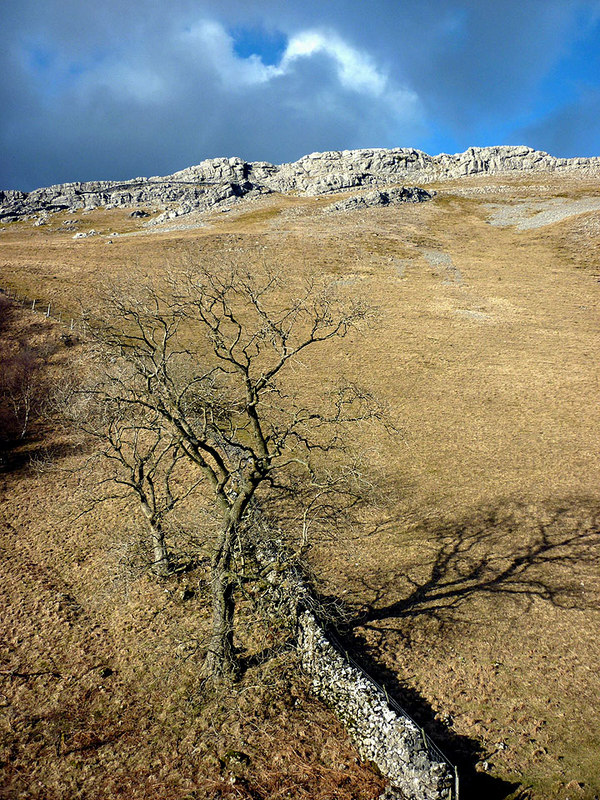
Helbeck Wood

Helbeck Wood is a Site of Special Scientific Interest (SSSI) in Cumbria, England. It is located near the village of Helbeck, 3km east of Warcop. This wooded protected area is on a scarp slope in the Pennines and has exceptional ash-elm wood on limestone.

This protected area includes Flascoe Wood and Yosgill Wood.

== Biology ==
The dominant tree species in Helbeck Wood is ash. Sessile oak is more dominant in Yosgill Wood. Herb species recorded in the protected area include narrow leaved helleborine, dark-red helleborine, broad-leaved helleborine and wood vetch. Lichen species recorded here include Lobaria laetevirens, Nephroma laevigatum and Thelotrema lepadinum.

Bird species recorded in this protected area include buzzard, sparrowhawk, ring ouzel, redstart, wood warbler, spotted flycatcher, pied flycatcher and tree pipit.

== Geology ==
Soils at Helbeck Wood are largely calcareous, derived from Carboniferous limestone. The topography is uneven with deep valleys, numerous crags and associated areas of block and fine scree. In the western part of the protected area, there is glacial drift. Acidic soils in the southern part of the protected area are derived from Silurian sandstones where a stream called Yosgill Sike has formed a steep-sided gorge.

== Land ownership ==
The western part of Helbeck Wood SSSI is owned by the Ministry of Defence.
