= Skelghyll Beck =

Protected area in Cumbria, England

Coordinates: 54°25′16″N 2°55′52″W

Skelghyll Beck is a Site of Special Scientific Interest (SSSI) within Lake District National Park in Cumbria, England. It is located 2 km southeast of the town of Ambleside. The protected area is located 1 km east of Lake Windermere. Skelghyll Beck flows into Lake Windermere. This site is protected because of its exceptional geological exposures from the Silurian period.

== Geology ==
Skelghyll Beck has rocks from the Llandovery Epoch (Lower Silurian). It is the type locality for the Skelgill Beds. These rocks are the lowest Silurian strata in the Lake District.

The Skelghyll section is the type locality for several fossils including trilobite species Acernaspis glabra, Youngia moroides, Scotoharpes judex, Raphiophorus aloniensis and the brachipod Plectatrypa flexuosa and the graptolites Glyptograptus sinuatus, Diplograptus diminutus and Monograptus argenteus. Fossils of Dimorphograptus confertus, Monograptus triangulatus Stimulograptus segwickii and Lagarograptus tenuis have been recorded here.

== Land ownership ==
All land in Skelghyll Beck SSSI is owned by the National Trust.

Skelghyll Beck has been fenced off and trees planted as a means of controlling erosion presumably caused by over-grazing and human visitors.
