= Janny Wood Section =

Protected area in Cumbria, England

Coordinates: 54.428259°N 2.3359885°W

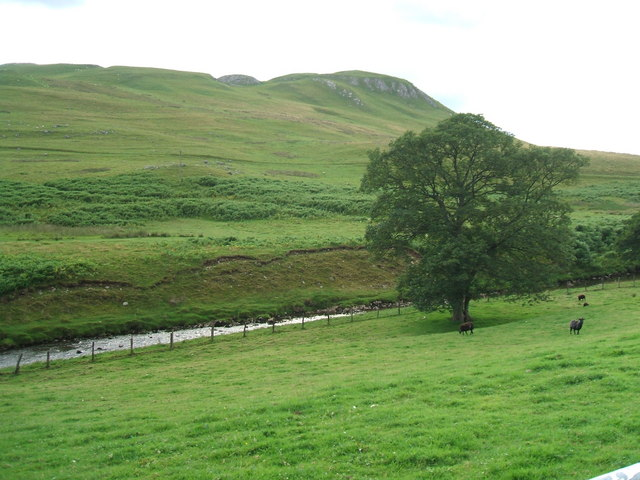
River Eden near Janny Wood Section

Janny Wood Section is a Site of Special Scientific Interest (SSSI) within Yorkshire Dales National Park in Cumbria, England. It is located 4.8km south of Kirkby Stephen and 1km north of Pendragon Castle. This protected area includes a stretch of the banks of the River Eden in the Vale of Eden, beneath the peak of Birkett Knott, near to where the stream called the Aller Gill flows into the River Eden. This area is protected because of the exposure of Carboniferous geological strata in limestone that show the transition between two different substages in the Visean age: from the Asbian substage to the Brigantian substage.

Janny Wood Section SSSI is adjacent to River Eden and Tributaries SSSI and so is part of a wider area of nature protection.

== Geology ==
This site is important for understanding the stratigraphy of the Lower Carboniferous subperiod. This site has been established as the stratotype for the Brigantian substage, as defined by the base of the Peghorn Limestone. The strata from the Asbian substage include Knipe Scar Limestone. Brachipod fossils from the Asbian substage here are from genera including Gigantoproductus, Latiproductus and Megachonetes. The strata from the Brigantian substage include Hexacorallia from the genera Aulophyllum and Diphyphyllum as well as brachiopod fossils from the genus Gigantoproductus.

The late Asbian and early Brigantian limestones at Janny Wood Section were probably formed in a shallow seas.

Records of miospores of Tripartites vetustus from both the Asbian and Brigantian substages have led to doubts over this stratographic distinction.

== Land ownership ==
All land within Janny Wood Section SSSI is owned by the local authority.
