= Hollows Farm Section =

Protected area in Cumbria, England

- Site of Special Scientific Interest
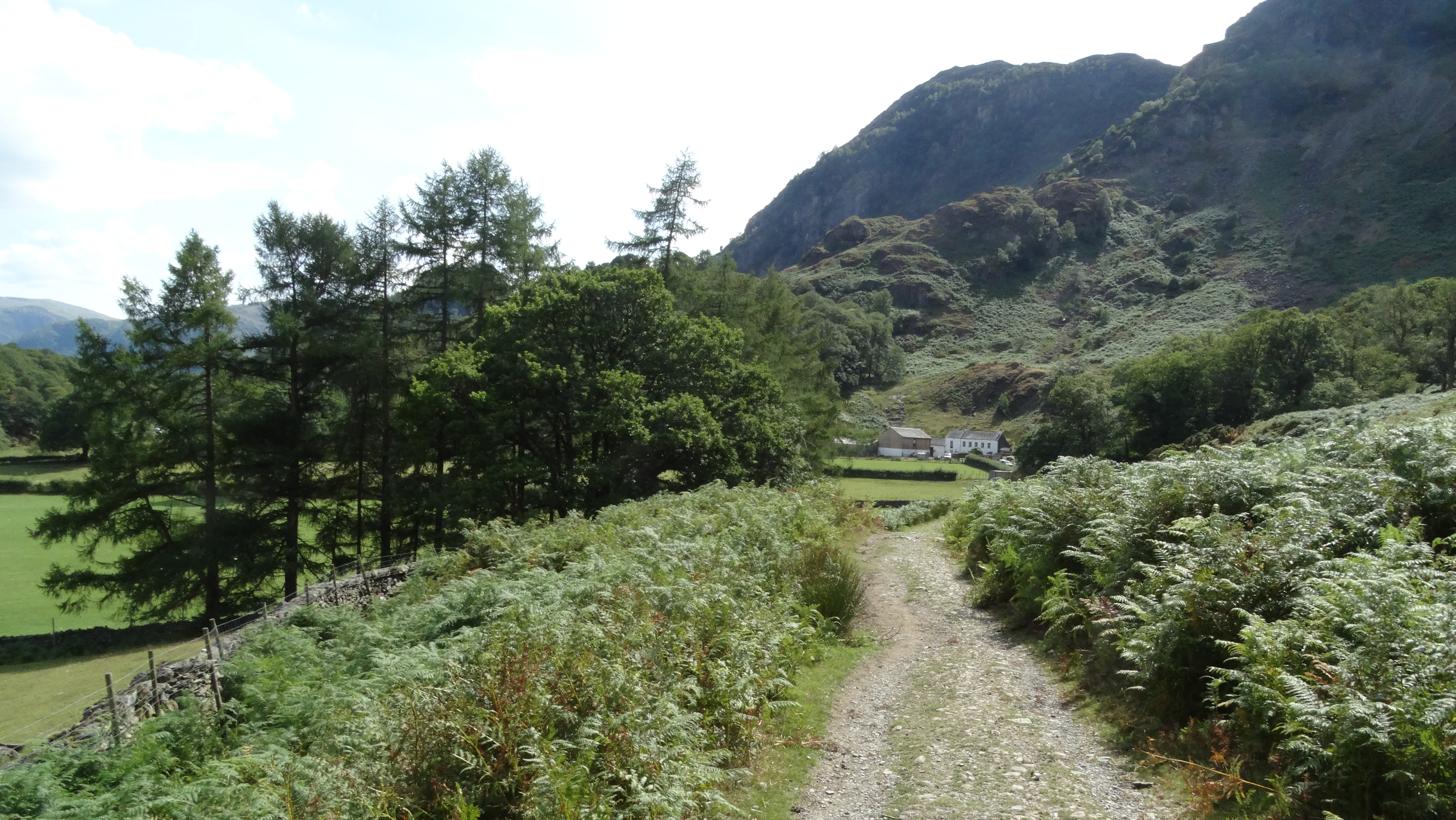
- Hollows Farm viewed from the Cumbria Way

- Location within Cumbria
- Location of Hollows Farm Section.
- Area of search: Cumbria
- Grid reference: NY249170
- Coordinates: 54.543°N 3.162°W
- Area: 5.9 acres (0.024 km^{2}; 0.0092 sq mi)
- Notification date: 1987

Hollows Farm Section is a Site of Special Scientific Interest (SSSI) within the Lake District National Park. It is located 2km north of Borrowdale in the valley of the River Derwent. This protected area is important because of its geology as it is a location where there is a junction between the Skiddaw Group and the Borrowdale Volcanic Group.

This protected area includes part of Scarbrow Wood and borders Buttermere Fells SSSI. This protected area also forms part of Borrowdale Rainforest National Nature Reserve.

== Geology ==
Some of the outcrops in Scarbrow Wood within Hollows Farm Section SSSI exhibit both slates from the Skiddaw Group and overlying tuffs (rocks made of volcanic ash) of the Borrowdale Volcanic Group. These outcrops show that a single set of cleavage surfaces pass undisturbed from slates to tuffs. This cleavage has been deformed by later folds.

== Land ownership ==
All of the land within Hollows Farm Section SSSI is owned by the National Trust.
