= Saxifraga aizoides =

Conservation status
- Secure (NatureServe)

Scientific classification
- Kingdom: Plantae
- Clade: Tracheophytes
- Clade: Angiosperms
- Clade: Eudicots
- Order: Saxifragales
- Family: Saxifragaceae
- Genus: Saxifraga
- Species: S. aizoides

Binomial name
- Saxifraga aizoides L.

Species of flowering plant

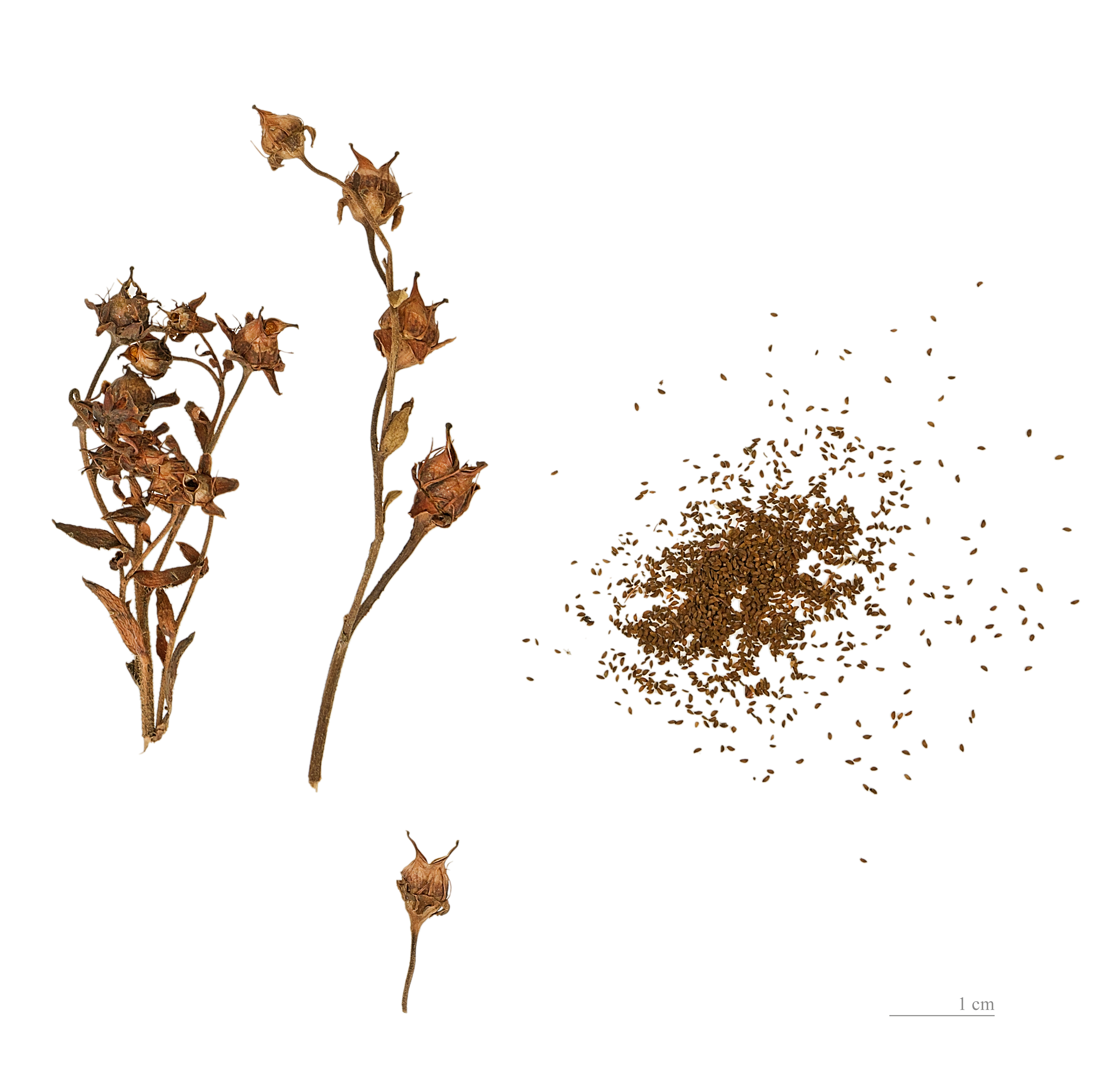
Capsules and seeds

Saxifraga aizoides, yellow mountain saxifrage or yellow saxifrage, is a flowering alpine plant of the genus Saxifraga.

== Description ==
Saxifraga aizoides is an evergreen perennial which branches at or below ground level, and grows to 2–10 centimetres (0.79–3.94 in). It spreads by short rhizomes, forming mats of small colonies.

The flowers, with five sepals and petals, are yellow—green.

Saxifraga Aizoides on the Greenland east coast in September

== Distribution ==
It prefers cold and moist well-draining neutral to basic bedrock, gravel, sand, or shale cliff environments. It is found in: North America, including Alaska, across Canada, the Great Lakes region, and Greenland; and in Europe, including the Tatra Mountains, Alps, and Svalbard.

It is a listed threatened species in New York state.
