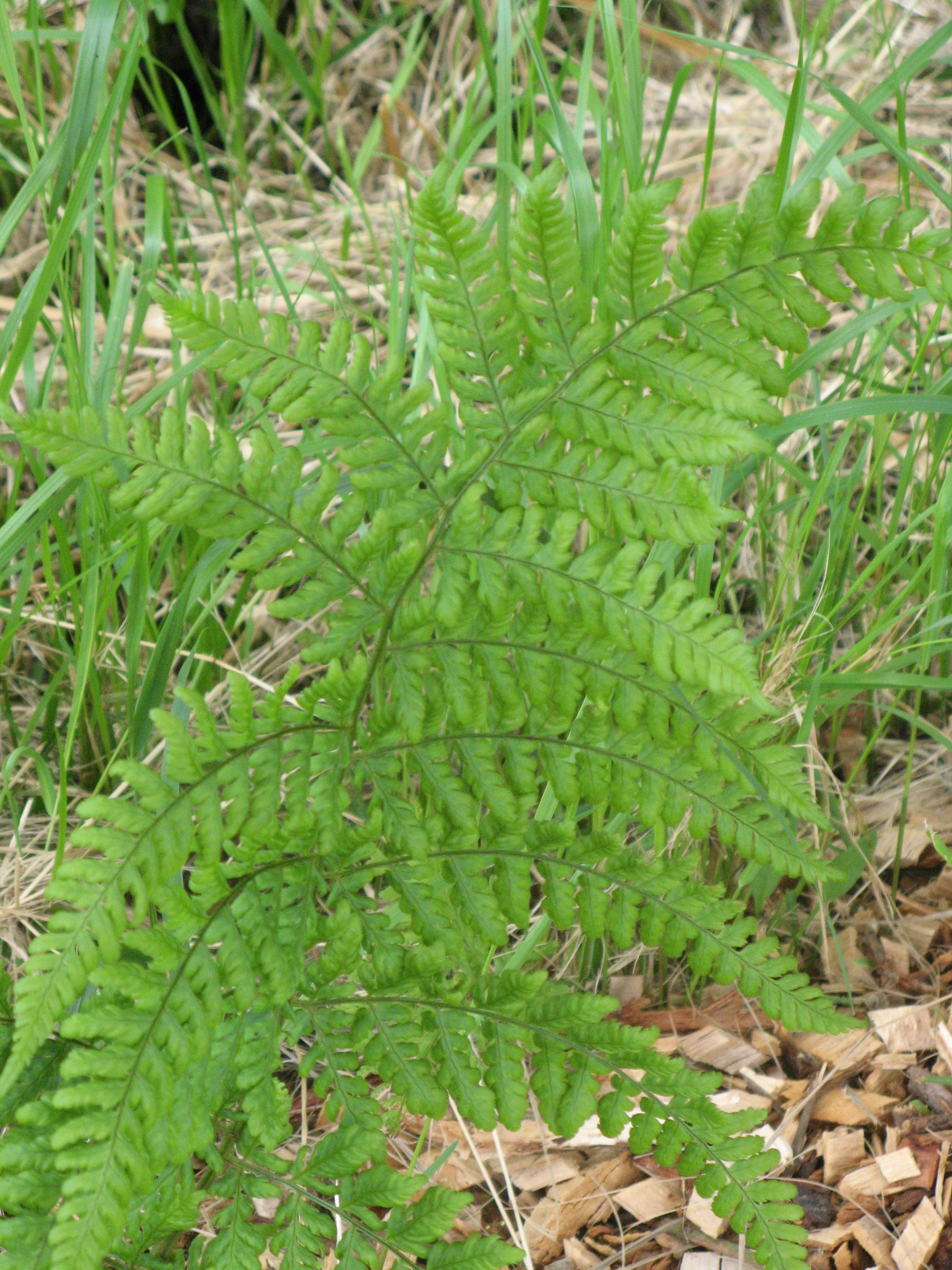

Scientific classification
- Kingdom: Plantae
- Clade: Tracheophytes
- Division: Polypodiophyta
- Class: Polypodiopsida
- Order: Polypodiales
- Suborder: Polypodiineae
- Family: Dryopteridaceae
- Genus: Dryopteris
- Species: D. dilatata

Binomial name
- Dryopteris dilatata (Hoffm.) A. Gray

= Dryopteris dilatata =

Species of fern

Dryopteris dilatata, the broad buckler-fern, is a robust species of deciduous or semievergreen fern in the family Dryopteridaceae, native to Europe, particularly western and central Europe. In southern Europe, it is mostly found in mountainous regions. It is also found between the Black Sea and the Caspian Sea. It grows to 90 cm (35 in) tall by 120 cm (47 in) wide, with dark green tripinnate fronds, the ribs covered in brown scales.

The Latin specific epithet dilatata means "spread out".

The species and the cultivars 'Crispa Whiteside' and 'Lepidota Cristata' have gained the Royal Horticultural Society's Award of Garden Merit.
