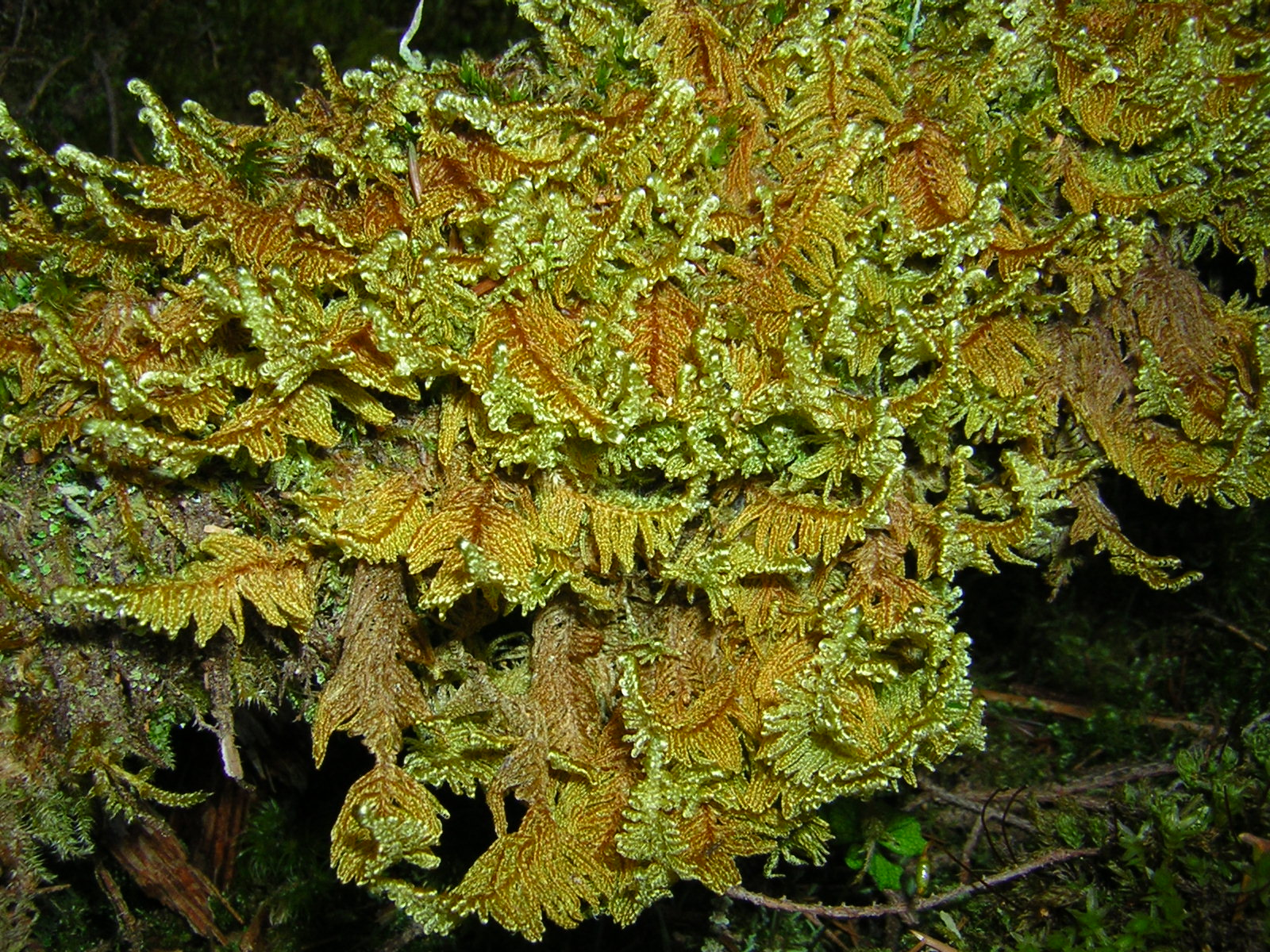

Scientific classification
- Kingdom: Plantae
- Division: Bryophyta
- Class: Bryopsida
- Subclass: Bryidae
- Order: Hypnales
- Family: Hypnaceae
- Genus: Ctenidium
- Species: C. molluscum

Binomial name
- Ctenidium molluscum Mitten, 1869

= Ctenidium molluscum =

Species of moss

Ctenidium molluscum is a species of moss belonging to the family Hypnaceae.

It is native to Eurasia and Northern America.
