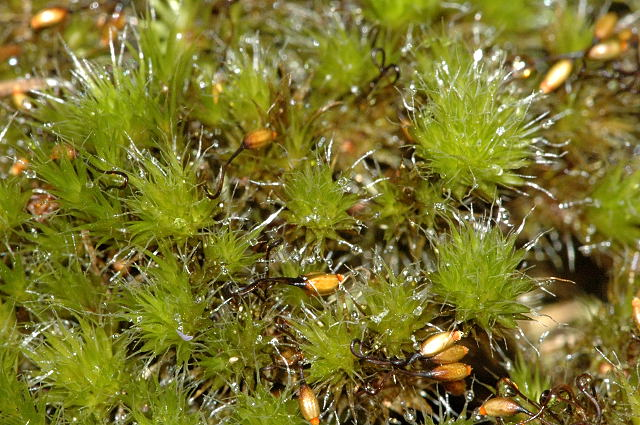

Scientific classification
- Kingdom: Plantae
- Division: Bryophyta
- Class: Bryopsida
- Subclass: Dicranidae
- Order: Dicranales
- Family: Dicranaceae
- Genus: Dicranum
- Species: D. majus

Binomial name
- Dicranum majus Turner, 1804

= Dicranum majus =

Species of moss

Dicranum majus is a species of moss belonging to the family Dicranaceae.

It is native to the Northern Hemisphere.
