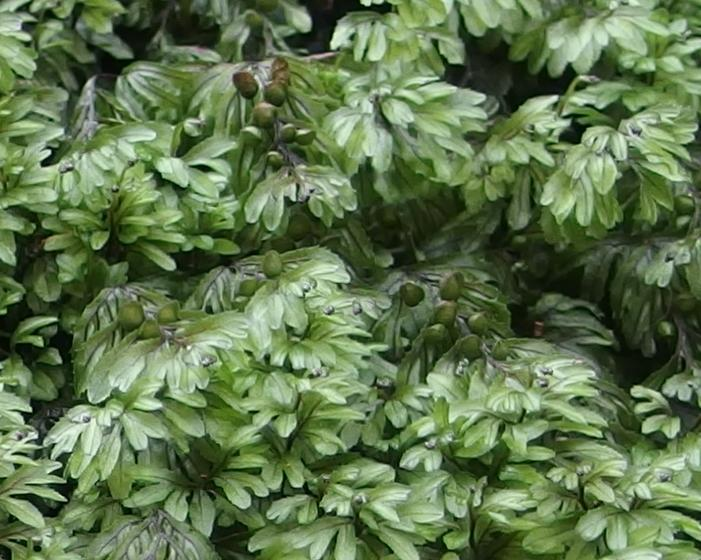

Scientific classification
- Kingdom: Plantae
- Clade: Tracheophytes
- Division: Polypodiophyta
- Class: Polypodiopsida
- Order: Hymenophyllales
- Family: Hymenophyllaceae
- Genus: Hymenophyllum
- Species: H. wilsonii

Binomial name
- Hymenophyllum wilsonii Hook.

= Hymenophyllum wilsonii =

Wilson's filmy-fern

Species of fern

Hymenophyllum wilsonii, the Wilson's filmy-fern, is a small, fragile, perennial leptosporangiate fern which forms large dense colonies from creeping rhizomes.

== Distribution ==
Confined to western Europe (Britain, Ireland, France, Norway, Spain and The Faeroes) and Macaronesia.

== Gallery ==
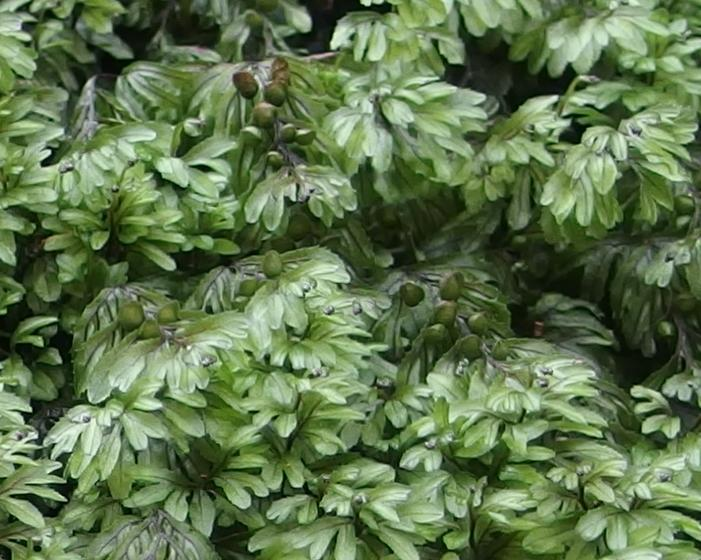
Detail of Hymenophyllum wilsonii fronds. Indusia are present.

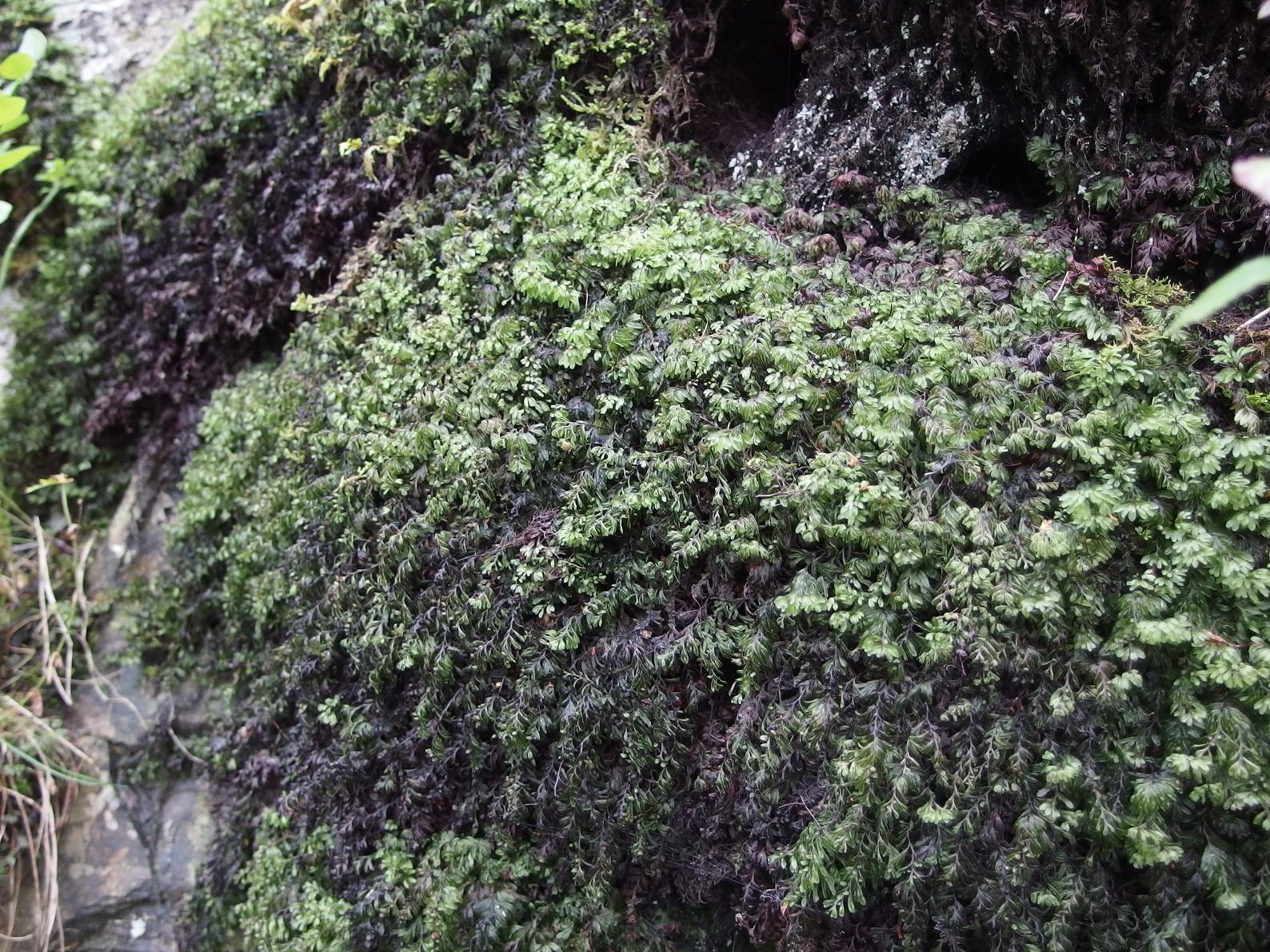
Hymenophyllum wilsonii colony.

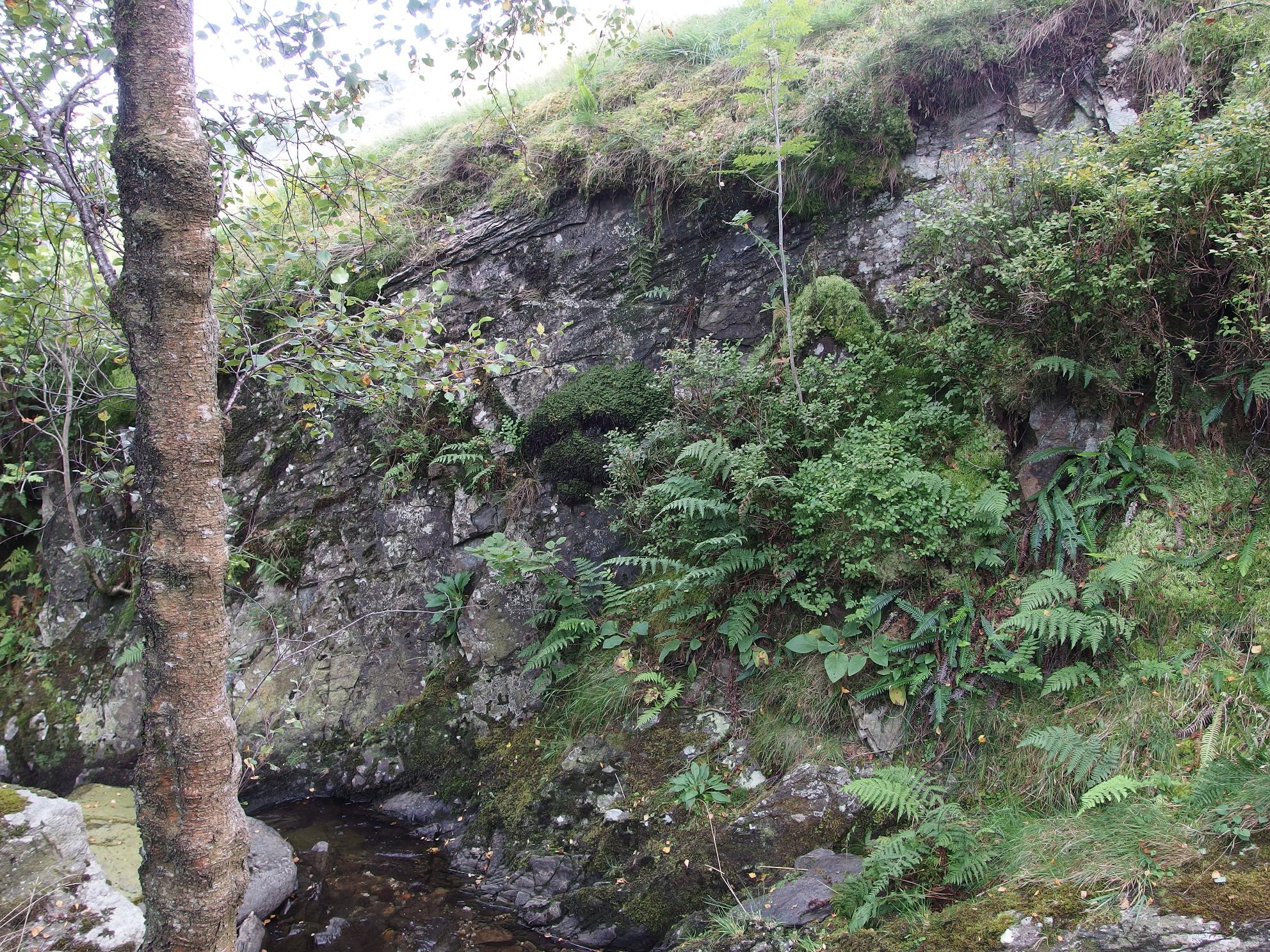
Hymenophyllum wilsonii habitat. Near Kendal, Cumbria, England.
