= Listed buildings in Cartmel Fell =

Cartmel Fell is a civil parish in Westmorland and Furness, Cumbria, England. It contains 35 listed buildings that are recorded in the National Heritage List for England. Of these, three are listed at Grade I, the highest of the three grades, two are at Grade II*, the middle grade, and the others are at Grade II, the lowest grade. The parish is in the Lake District National Park, and is mainly rural. Most of the listed buildings are houses and associated structures, farmhouses and farm buildings. The other listed buildings include a church and items in the churchyard, bridges, a milestone, a war memorial, and a public house

== Key ==
Grade	Criteria
I	Buildings of exceptional interest, sometimes considered to be internationally important
II*	Particularly important buildings of more than special interest
II	Buildings of national importance and special interest

== Buildings ==
Name and location	Photograph	Date	Notes	Grade
St Anthony's Church; 54.28490°N 2.89774°W		c. 1504	Originally a chapel of ease to Cartmel Priory, the church was extended in about 1520, the south porch was added in the 16th century, the vestry probably in the 18th century, and the church was restored in 1911. It is built in roughcast stone with ashlar dressings and a slate roof. The church consists of a nave and chancel in a single cell, a south gabled porch, and a west tower with a northwest vestry. The tower has a saddleback roof and a blocked west doorway, and the porch has a Tudor arched entrance. The windows are mullioned with straight heads and hood moulds.	I
Hodge Hill; 54.28577°N 2.89475°W		c. 1560	A house, later a hotel, it is in roughcast stone with a slate roof. There are two storeys with an attic, and an entrance front of five bays, the end bays gabled, and the right bay projecting. In the second bay is a stair window, the third bay has a gabled dormer with a ball finial, and in the fourth bay is a porch with a spinning gallery above. On the left return are three bays, and at the rear are six bays. The windows have chamfered mullions and transoms.	II*
Collinfield Farmhouse and barns 54.29582°N 2.90099°W	—	17th century	The farmhouse and two bank barns are in stone with Westmorland slate roofs. The farmhouse is roughcast and rendered, and has two storeys and two bays and a later added bay. On the front is a porch, flanked by rectangular windows under a continuous hood mould. The two barns, one with an L-shaped plan, the other rectangular, have quoins, and contain windows, doorways, owl holes, and vents.	II
Barn, Pool Garth Nook; 54.28597°N 2.90020°W	—	17th century (probable)	The barn is in stone with a slate roof, and is built into a hillside. It contains a barn entrance, a smaller entrance, and a pitching hole. Inside are three bays, and re-used cruck trusses.	II
Barn, Thorphinsty Hall; 54.26912°N 2.89999°W	—	17th century (possible)	The barn is in stone with a slate roof, and has five bays. In the south front are barn doors, five rectangular openings, and an outshut. The gable ends contain ventilation slits, and in the east gable are pigeon loft entrances with ledges. In the north front is a winnowing door and ventilation slits, and inside are raised cruck trusses.	II
Great Hartbarrow Farmhouse, cottage and outbuilding 54.30764°N 2.91149°W	—	1684	The farmhouse, outbuilding and cottage are in roughcast stone, with slate roofs. They have two storeys, the farmhouse has four bays, the outbuilding to the left has two bays, the lower cottage to the right has two bays, and there is a wing at the rear. On the front is a lozenge-shaped datestone. Most of the windows are sashes, and in the rear wing are mullioned windows. (Note: Street View in March 2009 shows that the outbuilding has been converted for residential use.)	II
Chapel House Farmhouse; 54.28613°N 2.89715°W	—	1693	The farmhouse is in stone with a slate roof, two storeys and three bays, and with a gabled wing and an outshut at the rear. In the ground floor are small-paned windows, in the upper floor are sash windows, and in the rear wing is a three-light mullioned window. The doorway has a slated gabled hood on iron posts.	II
Base of sundial 54.28479°N 2.89769°W		Late 17th or early 18th century	The sundial base is in the churchyard of St Anthony's Church. It is in stone, and consists of a rectangular block with a rounded end and three steps. Inserted in it is a timber post.	II
Birks Bridge; 54.31911°N 2.90364°W		17th or 18th century (probable)	A clapper bridge over the River Winster, it has four rectangular piers and abutments. Its flagstones are continued beyond the bridge as a raised pavement, and there is an iron handrail.	II
Tower Wood Cottage and barn 54.31134°N 2.94496°W	—	Late 17th or early 18th century	The house and barn are in stone with a slate roof. The house has two storeys and three bays, and a central doorway with a gabled slate canopy. The windows vary; some are mullioned, and others are sashes. The barn to the left has a ramped entrance, two other entrances, and three windows.	II
Thorphinsty Hall, North Cottage and South Cottage; 54.26845°N 2.90056°W	—	1708 or earlier	A group of three houses forming an L-shaped plan. They are in stone, partly rendered, and have a Welsh slate roof. There are two storeys, the south front has seven bays with the right bay gabled, and the west front has eight bays. The windows vary, but most are mullioned and contain casements, and many have hood moulds. Above a doorway on the west front is an initialled and dated lintel.	II
Burblethwaite Hall; 54.29398°N 2.90103°W	—	1714	A roughcast stone farmhouse with a slate roof, two storeys, two bays, and a continuous outshut at the rear. The windows are sashes, and above the door is a round-arched hood and a slated gable. The datestone has an arched head, an egg and dart moulded frame, and foliated lettering.	II
Ghyll Head Cottage and The Homestead; 54.32706°N 2.93390°W	—	1719	A pair of roughcaststone houses with a slate roof, two storeys, three bays, and a gabled rear wing. Most of the windows are casements, there is a fire window, a datestone, and two doorways.	II
Bryan Beck Bank barn 54.30377°N 2.91358°W	—	Early 18th century	The barn is in stone, much of it on a plinth, with quoins and stone-slate roofs. It has a main range with a two-storey wing and a single-storey lean-to, giving a T-shaped plan. The barn contains cart entrances, doorways and windows.	II
House, High Ludderburn; 54.31308°N 2.91665°W	—	Early 18th century (probable)	The house is in roughcast stone with a slate roof, and has two storeys, three bays, and a single-storey recessed bay on the left. Some of the windows are sashes, others have small panes with opening lights, and there is a fire window. Above the ground floor windows is a hood mould, and the doorway has a gabled canopy. At the rear is a mullioned window and a stair window.	II
Winster Bridge; 54.32694°N 2.90210°W		1729	Originally a packhorse bridge, it carries a driveway over the River Winster. The bridge is in stone with a limestone parapet, and consists of a single segmental arch. On the east end are two square gate piers with ball finials.	II
High Ludderburn; 54.31304°N 2.91650°W	—	18th century	A roughcast house with a slate roof, two storeys and three bays. The ground floor windows are casements, and above them is a hood mould. The central doorway has a lean-to canopy.	II
Barn, High Ludderburn; 54.31273°N 2.91739°W	—	18th century (probable)	The barn is in stone with a slate roof. It has two storeys with an outshut at the left. The openings include doorways, windows, one of which is mullioned, and a winnowing door.	II
Barn, Hodge Hill; 54.28595°N 2.89462°W		18th century (probable)	The barn is in stone with a slate roof, and has a projecting gabled wing to the left with ball finials. There are various openings, including a winnowing door and blocked ventilation slits.	II
Former Barn, Hodge Hill; 54.28610°N 2.89462°W		18th century (probable)	Originally a barn, later converted into a house, it is in stone with a slate roof. At the rear is a gabled projection and outshuts. Many of the former openings have been converted into doorways and windows, including a former winnowing door.	II
Lightwood Cottage and barn 54.29363°N 2.91008°W		18th century (probable)	A stone house and barn, the house roughcast, with a slate roof. The house has two storeys and three bays, with a flat-roofed trellis porch on the front. Most of the windows are sashes, some are small-paned with opening lights, and at the rear is a two-light mullioned window. The barn is higher, and contains an entrance, a window, a blocked winnowing door, and blocked ventilation holes.	II
Low Ludderburn; 54.31295°N 2.91541°W	—	18th century (probable)	A roughcast stone house with a slate roof, it has two storeys and two bays, and an outshut to the left. The left bay projects forward and contains a stair window. In the right bay is a casement window in the ground floor, and a small-paned window with an opening light in the upper floor. The porch is gabled, and elsewhere are casement windows.	II
Outbuilding, Low Ludderburn; 54.31299°N 2.91567°W	—	18th century (probable)	Originally a barn, later converted for residential use, it is in roughcast stone with a slate roof. It has two storeys, with three entrances and two small windows in the ground floor. In the upper floor and in the left return are sash windows. On the right side are external steps leading to an upper floor entrance.	II
Masons Arms; 54.29764°N 2.90318°W		18th century	A public house that originated as a coaching inn, it is in rendered stone with a Westmorland slate roof. There are two storeys and three bays, and two doorways with corbelled stone canopies. The windows are sashes in moulded surrounds. Internally, the original plan remains largely intact.	II
Milestone; 54.29461°N 2.91021°W	—	Late 18th or early 19th century	The milestone was provided for the Kirkby Kendal to Kirkby Ireleth Turnpike Trust. It consists of a round-headed stone post inscribed with an initial and a number representing the distance in miles to Kendal.	II
Farm buildings, Winster House; 54.32788°N 2.90792°W		Early 19th century	The farm buildings are in stone with quoins, and they form a U-shaped plan. The east range consists of a three-bay barn that has a hipped roof with two ball finials. The central bay projects forwards and has a coped gable. The range contains entrances and sash windows, all with segmental heads. In the south range is a round-arched passageway and a dovecote.	II
Winster House; 54.32751°N 2.90793°W		1827	A roughcast stone house with a sill band, wide bracketed eaves, and a slate roof. There are two storeys, and three bays on each front. The east front has a central porch with an entablature and a door with a fanlight. The ground floor windows are in segmental-headed recesses, and all the windows are sashes. At the rear the first bay is gabled, and there is an outshut.	II
Broadleys; 54.33181°N 2.93479°W		1898–99	A house by Charles Voysey, later owned by the Windermere Motor Boat Racing Club, it is roughcast with stone dressings, a hipped slate roof, and an L-shaped plan. It has a single storey with an attic and a basement, a west front facing Windermere of three bays, and a four-bay service range at right angles to the rear. In the west front are three full-height bow windows. The east front contains the entrance, and has a porch with two Tuscan columns. The windows are mullioned, some also with transoms, and in the roof are dormers.	I
Entrance lodge, Broadleys; 54.33135°N 2.93467°W	—	1898–1900	The lodge, by Charles Voysey, is in slate, partly roughcast, and has wide eaves, gables with moulded bargeboards, and a slate roof. It has one storey with an attic, and three bays. The windows are casements with architraves and moulded sills. The northeast angle is recessed to form a porch with a Tuscan column, and above the porch is an iron overthrow for a lantern. In the north gable is a timber dovecote with ledges but no holes.	II*
Wall, gates and piers, Broadleys; 54.33158°N 2.93440°W	—	1898–1900	The wall and gate piers by Charles Voysey are in slate and limestone, and the wall has a coping of vertical voussoirs. The northern pair of gate piers are round with flat circular caps surmounted by small boulders. The southern pair are square with flat square caps and large limestone boulders.	II
Broadleys Cottage; 54.33021°N 2.93414°W	—	1898–1900	A house by Charles Voysey, it is roughcast with wide eaves, buttresses, and a hipped slate roof. There is one storey with attics and three bays. The windows are casements, and in the middle bay is a four-light gabled dormer. At the rear, the middle bay is gabled.	II
Moor Crag; 54.32644°N 2.93644°W	—	1898–1900	A large house designed by Charles Voysey, it is roughcast with slate dressings and a hipped slate roof. Most of the house is in two storeys, there are six bays on the north front and five on the south. The windows are mullioned, some also with transoms. Other features include wide eaves, gables with moulded bargeboards, dormers, canted bay windows, and a verandah.	I
Coach house and stable, Moor Crag; 54.32573°N 2.93759°W	—	1898–1900	The coach house and stable were designed by Charles Voysey. The building is in stone, partly roughcast, with wide eaves and a swept slate roof. It has a single storey, three bays, various doorways, and gables with moulded bargeboards. In the gable facing the road is a loading door with a cornice and ventilation holes, and in the west gable is a mullioned window.	II
Birket Houses; 54.32915°N 2.90546°W	—	1907–08	A country house, later a hotel, it is in roughcast stone with stone dressings, slate roofs, and has an L-shaped plan. There are two storeys, the south front has five bays, and there are four bays in each of the other fronts. In the south front are a recessed loggia under a gable, a gabled bay window, and a gabled two-storey porch. The windows are mullioned or mullioned and transomed, and have hood moulds.	II
War memorial 54.28462°N 2.89781°W		1924	The war memorial is in the churchyard of St Anthony's Church. It consists of a monolith of slate with flat front and back faces, and rough-hewn sides. It stands on a stone base with two tiers. On the front is carved a wreath in relief, an inscription, and the names of those lost in the two World Wars.	II

== See also ==
- Listed buildings in Windermere
- Listed buildings in Crook
- Listed buildings in Crosthwaite and Lyth
- Listed buildings in Witherslack
- Listed buildings in Meathop and Ulpha
- Listed buildings in Lindale and Newton-in-Cartmel
- Listed buildings in Staveley-in-Cartmel

== Notes and references ==
=== Sources ===
- Historic England, "Church of St Anthony, Cartmel Fell (1224955)", National Heritage List for England
- Historic England, "Hodge Hill, Cartmel Fell (1289621)", National Heritage List for England
- Historic England, "Collinfield Farmhouse and two bank barns, Cartmel Fell (1488251)", National Heritage List for England
- Historic England, "Barn at Pool Garth Nook, Cartmel Fell (1289617)", National Heritage List for England
- Historic England, "Barn approximately 80 metres to north of Thorphinsty Hall, Cartmel Fell (1266562)", National Heritage List for England
- Historic England, "Great Hartbarrow Farmhouse, cottage and outbuilding, Cartmel Fell (1212226)", National Heritage List for England
- Historic England, "Chapel House Farmhouse, Cartmel Fell (1335907)", National Heritage List for England
- Historic England, "Base of sundial approximately 15 metres to south-east of St Anthony's church, Cartmel Fell (1224956)", National Heritage List for England
- Historic England, "Birks Bridge, Cartmel Fell (1266566)", National Heritage List for England
- Historic England, "Tower Wood Cottage and attached barn, Cartmel Fell (1224962)", National Heritage List for England
- Historic England, "Thorphinsty Hall, North Cottage and South Cottage, Cartmel Fell (1224957)", National Heritage List for England
- Historic England, "Burblethwaite Hall, Cartmel Fell (1086921)", National Heritage List for England
- Historic England, "Ghyll Head Cottage and The Homestead, Cartmel Fell (1224958)", National Heritage List for England
- Historic England, "Bryan Beck Bank barn, Cartmel Fell (1408802)", National Heritage List for England
- Historic England, "House to rear of High Ludderburn, Cartmel Fell (1289650)", National Heritage List for England
- Historic England, "Winster Bridge, Cartmel Fell (1224963)", National Heritage List for England
- Historic England, "High Ludderburn, Cartmel Fell (1086919)", National Heritage List for England
- Historic England, "Barn approximately 80 metres to south-west of High Ludderburn, Cartmel Fell (1335906)", National Heritage List for England
- Historic England, "Barn approximately 10 metres to north of Hodge Hill, Cartmel Fell (1224953)", National Heritage List for England
- Historic England, "Former barn approximately 40 metres to north of Hodge Hill, Cartmel Fell (1224954)", National Heritage List for England
- Historic England, "Lightwood Cottage and adjoining barn, Cartmel Fell (1212230)", National Heritage List for England
- Historic England, "Low Ludderburn, Cartmel Fell (1335905)", National Heritage List for England
- Historic England, "Outbuilding to west of Low Ludderburn, Cartmel Fell (1289648)", National Heritage List for England
- Historic England, "Masons Arms, Cartmel Fell (1413908)", National Heritage List for England
- Historic England, "Milestone approximately 180 metres east of Lightwood, Cartmel Fell (1086920)", National Heritage List for England
- Historic England, "Farm buildings approximately 20 metres to north of Winster House, and adjoining wall, Cartmel Fell (1366032)", National Heritage List for England
- Historic England, "Winster House, Cartmel Fell (1266565)", National Heritage List for England
- Historic England, "Broadleys, Cartmel Fell (1224995)", National Heritage List for England
- Historic England, "Entrance lodge to south of Broadleys, Cartmel Fell (1266564)", National Heritage List for England
- Historic England, "Wall approximately 50 metres long to east of Broadleys and gates with gate piers to either end, Cartmel Fell (1225005)", National Heritage List for England
- Historic England, "Broadleys Cottage, Cartmel Fell (1224959)", National Heritage List for England
- Historic England, "Moor Crag, Cartmel Fell (1224960)", National Heritage List for England
- Historic England, "Coach house to Moor Crag opposite entrance gateway, Cartmel Fell (1224961)", National Heritage List for England
- Historic England, "Birket Houses, Cartmel Fell (1266552)", National Heritage List for England
- Historic England, "Cartmel Fell War Memorial, Cartmel Fell (1457220)", National Heritage List for England
- Historic England, Listed Buildings
- Hyde, Matthew; Pevsner, Nikolaus (2010) [1967], Cumbria, The Buildings of England, New Haven and London: Yale University Press, ISBN 978-0-300-12663-1
