= Meathop and Ulpha =

Former civil parish in Cumbria, England

Coordinates: 54.220°N 2.863°W

- Milnthorpe Sands

- Location in South Lakeland Location within Cumbria
- Population: 154 (2011)
- OS grid reference: SD4380
- Civil parish: Witherslack, Meathop and Ulpha
- Unitary authority: Westmorland and Furness
- Ceremonial county: Cumbria
- Region: North West
- Country: England
- Sovereign state: United Kingdom
- Post town: GRANGE OVER SANDS
- Postcode district: LA11
- Dialling code: 01539
- Police: Cumbria
- Fire: Cumbria
- Ambulance: North West
- UK Parliament: Westmorland and Lonsdale

Meathop and Ulpha is a former civil parish, now in the parish of Witherslack, Meathop and Ulpha, in the Westmorland and Furness district of the English county of Cumbria. Historically in Westmorland, it is located 3.6 miles (5.8 km) north east of Grange-over-Sands, 10.6 miles (17.1 km) south west of Kendal and 64.0 miles (103.0 km) south of Carlisle, between the confluence of the River Kent estuary and the River Winster. In 2001 it had a population of 143, increasing slightly to 154 at the Census 2011. It included the village of Meathop.

There were two Sites of Special Scientific Interest in the parish:

- Meathop Moss is a raised peat-bog designated an SSSI for its biological interest. Leased by the Society for the Promotion of Nature Reserves in 1919, it now belongs to the Cumbria Wildlife Trust.
- Meathop Woods and Quarry, which consists of woodland and a disused quarry on the side of a hill, has biological and geological interest.

== History ==
Meathop and Ulpha was formerly a township in Beetham parish, from 1866 Meathop and Ulpha was a civil parish in its own right until it was abolished on 1 April 2015 and merged with Witherslack to form "Witherslack, Meathop and Ulpha".

== See also ==
- Listed buildings in Meathop and Ulpha
