= Clawthorpe Fell =

Nature reserve in Cumbria, England

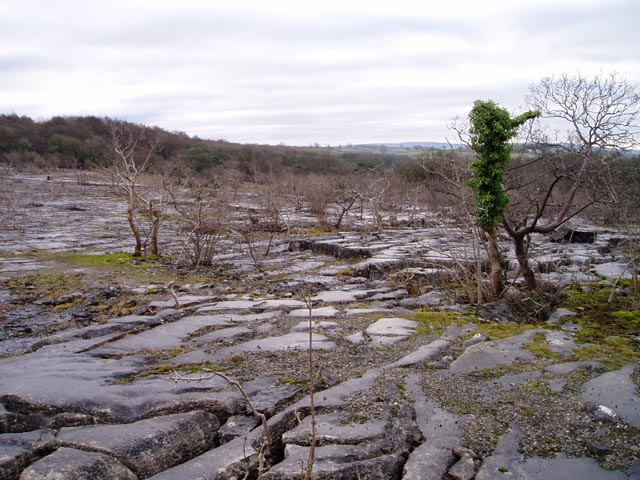
- Limestone pavement at Clawthorpe Fell

- Location within Cumbria
- Interactive map of Clawthorpe Fell
- Location: Near Burton-in-Kendal
- OS grid: SD 53528 78487
- Coordinates: 54°12′02″N 2°42′54″W
- Area: 12 hectares (30 acres)
- Operator: Cumbria Wildlife Trust
- Designation: Site of Special Scientific Interest; National Nature Reserve; Special Area of Conservation
- Website: www.cumbriawildlifetrust.org.uk/nature-reserves/clawthorpe-fell

Clawthorpe Fell is a nature reserve of the Cumbria Wildlife Trust, near Burton-in-Kendal in Cumbria, England. The reserve, and the neighbouring reserve Holme Park Quarry, are on the western edge of a large area of limestone pavement. This area, which contains Hutton Roof Crags and Farleton Knott, is an uncommon wildlife habitat.

== Description ==
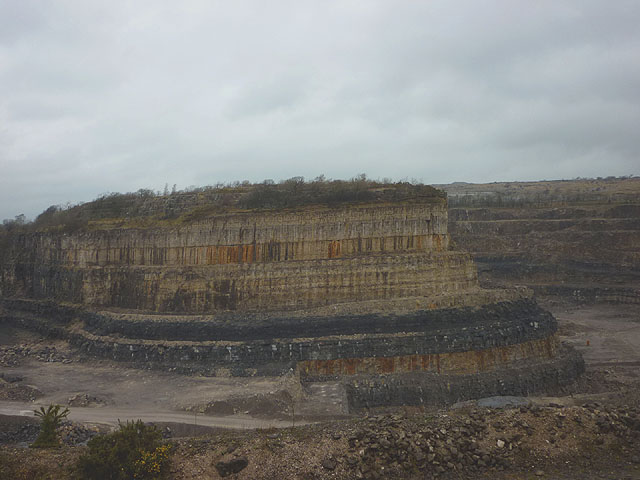
The "island", surrounded by the quarry

The area of the reserve is 12 hectares (30 acres). It was designated a National Nature Reserve in 1976. It is a Site of Special Scientific Interest, and a Special Area of Conservation.

Cumbria Wildlife Trust took over the management of Clawthorpe Fell and neighbouring site Holme Park Quarry, both owned by Aggregate Industries, in March 2022.

There are two parts to the nature reserve: the "mainland", an expanse of limestone pavement, across which there is a footpath, on the edge of a quarry; and the "island", which is closed to public access, in the middle of the quarry.

== Wildlife ==
The mainland is a habitat for butterflies and moths; plants include dark-red helleborine, found in only a few sites in the UK, and bird's foot sedge. On the island, less damaged by quarrying, there is grassland and scrub; there are junipers, ferns, and in some years fly orchids.
