= Whitbarrow =

Natural feature in Cumbria, England

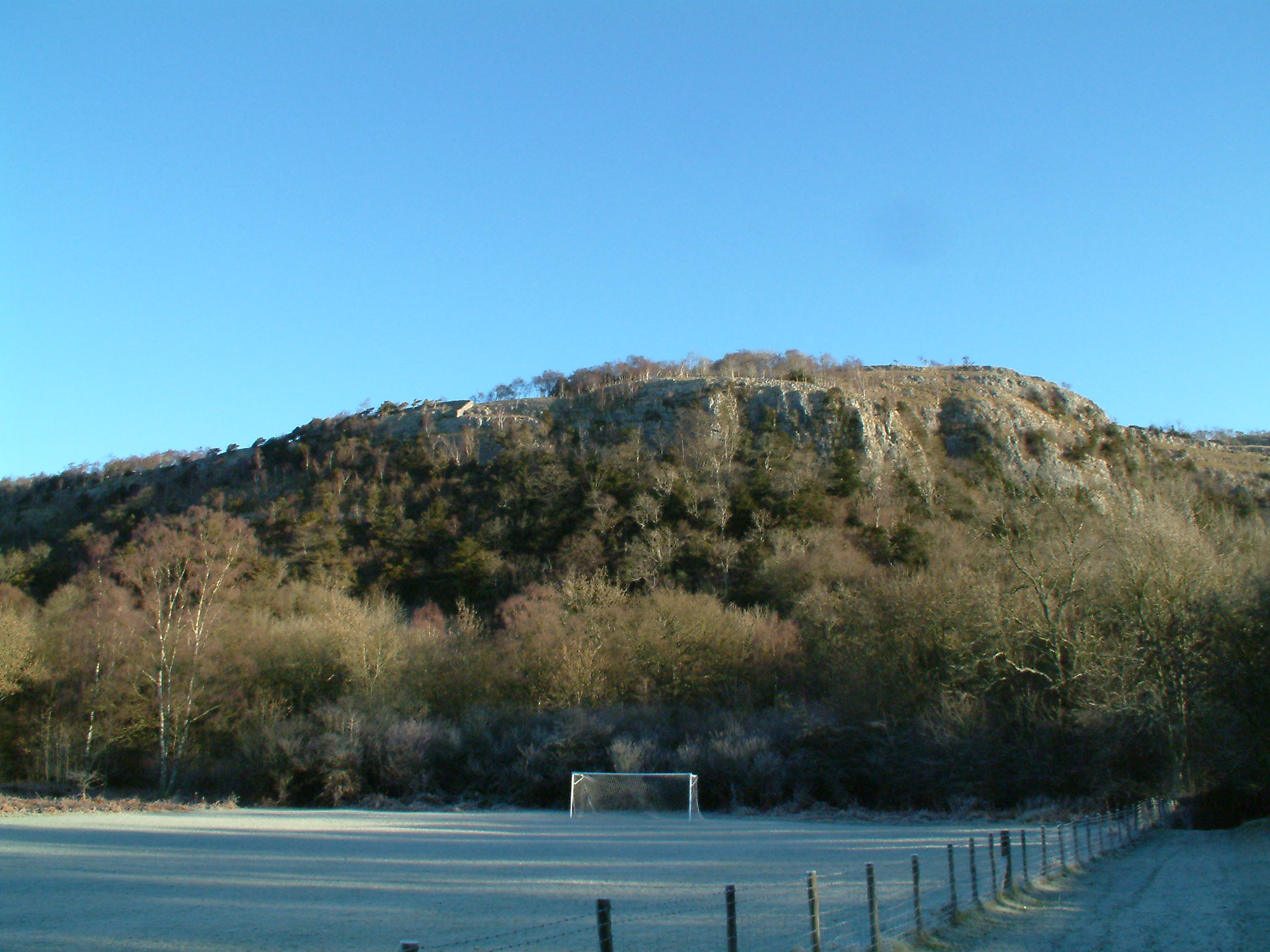
- Whitbarrow from near Oversands School

Highest point
- Elevation: 215 m (705 ft)
- Prominence: 182 m (597 ft)
- Parent peak: High Street
- Listing: Marilyn, Outlying Wainwright
- Coordinates: 54°16′32″N 2°51′36″W

Geography
- Location within the Lake District
- Location: Lake District, England
- OS grid: SD441870
- Topo map: OS Landranger 97

Whitbarrow is a hill in Cumbria, England, designated a biological Site of Special Scientific Interest and national nature reserve, forming part of the Morecambe Bay Pavements Special Area of Conservation due to its supporting some of the best European examples of natural limestone habitats. Also known as Whitbarrow Scar (though properly that term applies to the cliffs lining its western edge), the hill lies about 9 kilometres (5.6 mi) southwest of Kendal, just north of the A590 road, close to the village of Witherslack. Part of the site is a local nature reserve called Whitbarrow Scar. Whitbarrow's summit, known as Lord's Seat, is at 215 metres (705 ft) and has a prominence of 182 metres (597 ft), classifying it as a Marilyn.

It is a mixture of woodland, grassland and limestone pavement. The hill is prominent from the A590 road with its steep limestone cliffs, laid down in the Carboniferous period some 350 million years ago. The main cliff faces are made up of rocks known as Dalton Beds, above which are Urswick Limestones, of which the limestone pavement (here and elsewhere around Morecambe Bay, including Hutton Roof Crags) has been formed.

Whitbarrow, like most of the Lake District, shows many signs of the last ice age, including glacial erratics (boulders left behind when the ice retreated), and the limestone pavement itself, formed when ice left bare limestone exposed to the elements which eroded it and left us with the grikes and clints we see today. The limestone has been used for many purposes including building, agricultural fertiliser, and production of millstones, but is now protected by law and it is an offence to remove any. Whitbarrow NNR is owned and managed by the Forestry Commission, Lake District National Park Authority and the Cumbria Wildlife Trust.

Much of Whitbarrow is covered in woodland, initially naturally and from 1919 following planting; the Forestry Commission now holds leases on parts of the hill. A variety of techniques are used to manage the woodland, including coppicing; the variety of methods adds to the range of wildlife resulting.

A 6.5-mile (10.5 km) anticlockwise walk to Whitbarrow's summit, Lord's Seat, from Witherslack, returning along the valley to the west, forms a chapter in The Outlying Fells of Lakeland by Alfred Wainwright. He describes it as "the most beautiful [walk] in this book; beautiful it is every step of the way. ... All is fair to the eye on Whitbarrow."
