= St Paul's Church, Witherslack =

Coordinates: 54.2503°N 2.8736°W

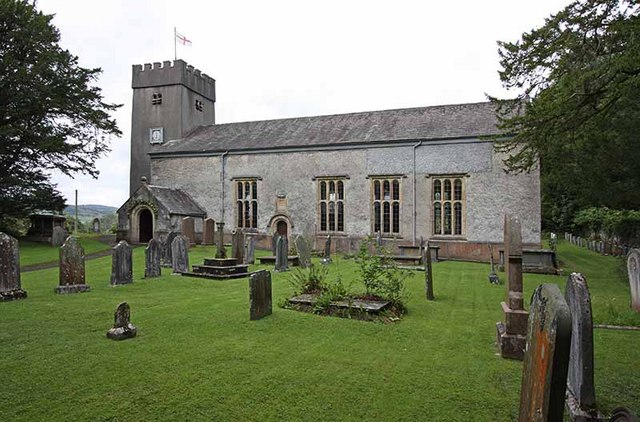
- St Paul's Church, Witherslack, from the south

- Location in Cumbria
- OS grid reference: SD 432,842
- Location: Witherslack, Cumbria
- Country: England
- Denomination: Anglican
- Website: St Paul, Witherslack

History
- Status: Parish church
- Founder: John Barwick
- Consecrated: June 1671

Architecture
- Functional status: Active
- Heritage designation: Grade II*
- Designated: 12 February 1962
- Architectural type: Church
- Style: Gothic
- Groundbreaking: 1668
- Completed: 1768

Specifications
- Materials: Stone, slate roof

Administration
- Province: York
- Diocese: Carlisle
- Archdeaconry: Westmorland and Furness
- Deanery: Kendal
- Parish: St Paul Witherslack

Clergy
- Vicar: Revd Michael David Woodcock

St Paul's Church is in the village of Witherslack, Cumbria, England. It is an active Anglican parish church in the deanery of Kendal, the archdeaconry of Westmorland and Furness, and the diocese of Carlisle. It is recorded in the National Heritage List for England as a designated Grade II* listed building. The authors of the Buildings of England series describe it as "an almost perfect example of a plain Gothic church of that date [1688], honest and unpretentious".

== History ==
The church was built between 1668 and 1669. It resulted from a bequest made by John Barwick, dean of St Paul's Cathedral, who died in 1664, to provide a burial place in the village of his birth, rather than the dead having to be carried across the tidal estuary of the river Kent for burial at St Michael's Church in Beetham. There had previously been a church in the village dedicated to Saint Mary, but this was ruined in the Civil War. John Barwick's brother, Peter, who was physician to Charles II, successfully petitioned the Bishop of Chester for a new church and a burial ground. The new church was a chapel of ease to the mother church at Beetham. The land for the church and burial ground were granted by the 8th Earl of Derby. The church was consecrated in June 1671 by the Bishop of Chester.

The height of the walls of the church was raised and a vestry was added in 1768 by John Hird. Hird also added a screen at the east end of the church. In 1881 St Paul's became an independent parish church. The church was restored in 1861, and was renovated in 1880. In 1891 the parish of Witherslack was joined with those of Meathop and Ulpha. There was a further amalgamation of parishes in 1973 when Witherslack joined with St Mary, Crosthwaite and St Anthony, Cartmel Fell.

== Architecture ==
=== Exterior ===
St Paul's is constructed in stone rubble with ashlar dressings and a slate roof. Its plan consists of a nave and a chancel in a single chamber, a south porch and a north vestry, and a west tower. The tower is in three stages. It has a west window of two round-headed lights in the bottom stage, two similar windows in the middle stage on the north and west sides, together with a square clock face on the south side with a single hand. In the top stage are two-light bell openings, with round heads and louvres. At the summit of the tower is a projecting embattled parapet. Along both sides of the church are four round-arched three-light windows with straight heads. The south porch is gabled, is surmounted by a ball finial, and leads to a round-headed doorway into the church. There is a similar doorway between the first and second windows, above which is an inscribed plaque. On the north side of the church is a small window between the second and third larger windows. To the east of these is a small gabled vestry, with a pointed doorway on its west side and a three-light east window. The east window of the chancel consists of five stepped lights, above which is a round-headed window, and a ball finial on the apex of the gable.

=== Interior ===
The screen at the east end of the church contains two Ionic columns and pilasters. The pulpit was constructed in 1880, using material from a 17th-century three-decker pulpit. It has a sounding board dated 1768. The small font is in the shape of a baluster, and dates from 1666. The reredos of 1889 was designed by Paley, Austin and Paley. Also in the church are Royal arms of 1710, and hatchments, including that of John Barwick. The stained glass in the east window includes the arms of Barwick. Its design has been attributed to Henry Gyles of York, and the window dates probably from 1671. In the church are monuments, including a tablet to John Barwick. Another monument is to a child who died aged two years, and includes a while marble effigy of a baby. There is also a memorial to the 16th Earl of Derby who died in 1908. The single-manual organ was built in 1878 by Brindley & Foster.

== External features ==
In the churchyard is a sundial dated 1757, carrying a plate dated 1671. It is constructed in ashlar and stands on three square steps with a square base supporting a round column. The sundial is listed at Grade II. Also listed at Grade II are the gate piers and overthrow to the south of the church.

== See also ==
- Grade II* listed buildings in Westmorland and Furness
- Listed buildings in Witherslack
- List of works by Paley, Austin and Paley
