= Foulshaw Moss =

Raised bog and nature reserve in Cumbria, England

Coordinates: 54.246°N 2.829°W

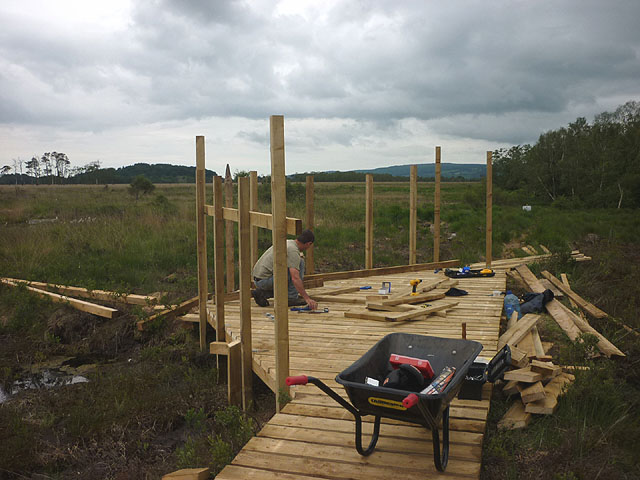
Work to improve access to Foulshaw Moss

Foulshaw Moss is a raised bog in Cumbria, England. In 1998 it was bought by Cumbria Wildlife Trust, which has worked to reverse damage caused to the bog by drainage and afforestation. It is protected as a Site of Special Scientific Interest and as part of the Witherslack Mosses Special Area of Conservation along with two smaller bogs Meathop Moss and Nichols Moss.

Raised bogs are rare in lowland Britain as many have been drained or used for planting trees, which by their presence extract water from the soil. Despite peat having been cut at the site in the past, this raised bog retains some of its dome of peat that is higher than the surrounding land. It has acid pools in the peat and hummocks of Sphagnum moss. Plants growing here include bog grasses, cottongrass, cranberry, heather, bog rosemary, bog myrtle and round-leaved sundew. There are damselflies and dragonflies, including the scarce emperor dragonfly and white-faced darter, and moths and butterflies, including the large heath. Birds such as osprey, snipe, moorhen and water rail breed here and buzzard, peregrine falcon, merlin and sparrowhawk search for prey.

== Reintroductions ==
With funding from Natural England, the Cumbria Wildlife Trust and the British Dragonfly Society have reintroduced a rare species of dragonfly, the White-faced darter, to the site from 2010. This is the first UK reintroduction of this species.

In 2014 ospreys nested at Foulshaw Moss. They have continued to breed at the site. In 2026 there were two nests and five chicks.

At the end of 2014 the Cumbria Wildlife Trust announced a project to develop a reed bed at Foulshaw Moss with funding from the SITA Trust. It was hoped to attract wildlife such as the bittern to the new habitat, which would replicate "lagg fen" which forms naturally round the edges of peat domes.

== Access ==
Boardwalks and bird hides allow visitors to view the ospreys from a distance.
