= Nichols Moss =

Nichols Moss is one of three wetland areas which make up Witherslack Mosses in Cumbria, England.

When designated for protection it consisted of 7 ha. It remains the smallest of the three sites, but it was expanded in 2022 to 12.5 ha when a field was purchased with a donation from the People's Postcode Lottery. The enlargement of the reserve will allow the Cumbria Wildlife Trust to reverse drainage of the bog, raising the water table.
