= Limestone Link (Cumbria) =

Footpath in Cumbria, England

Coordinates: 54.202°N 2.828°W

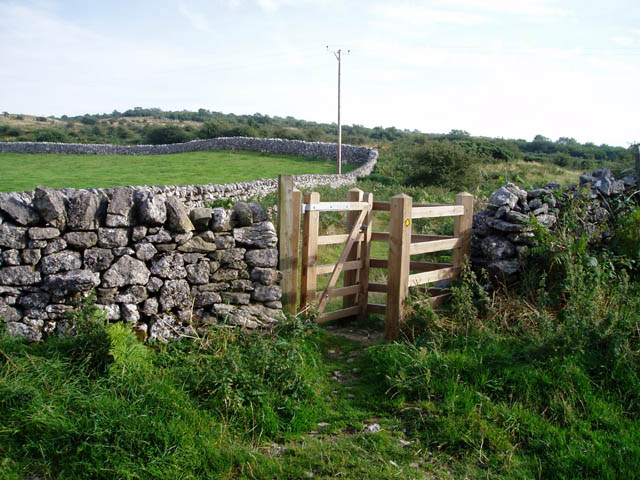
Gate on the Limestone Link approaching Hutton Roof Crags

The Limestone Link is a waymarked footpath in Westmorland and Furness, Cumbria, England, connecting Arnside and Kirkby Lonsdale, a distance of 13 miles (21 km).

Starting at Arnside railway station on the estuary of the River Kent, the path traverses the Arnside and Silverdale AONB, crosses the West Coast Main Line and the M6 motorway, climbs Hutton Roof Crags (899 feet (274 m), an SSSI celebrated for its limestone pavements), and drops down into the market town of Kirkby Lonsdale on the A65 road and the River Lune.
