= Morecambe Bay Pavements =

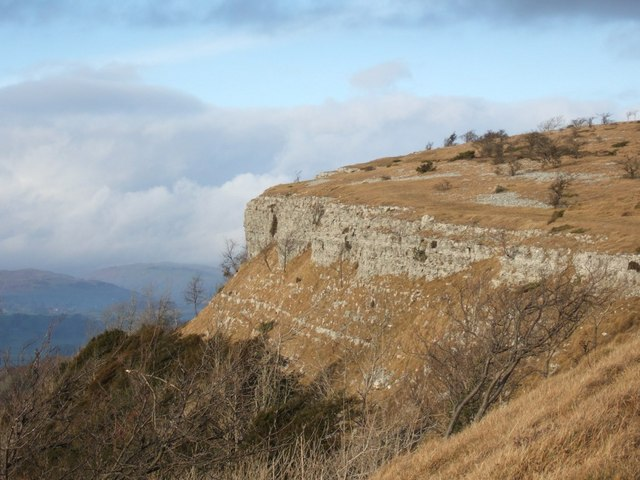
Scout Scar near Kendal, one of the sites included in the SAC

Morecambe Bay Pavements is a multi-site Special Area of Conservation comprising limestone pavements around Morecambe Bay in North-West England. It was designated in 2005 under the Habitats Directive. The SAC does not include any marine areas; Morecambe Bay itself is a separate SAC, which was designated the same year.

The SAC is designated for its biological rather than geological interest, but the areas protected, on the margins of Morecambe Bay, have in common that they feature faulted outcrops of Lower Carboniferous Limestone. The limestone tends to form hills as it is more resistant to erosion than other rocks in the area.

The individual sites, which are in the counties of Cumbria and Lancashire, include:

- Cunswick Scar
- Hutton Roof Crags
- Scout Scar
- Whitbarrow

== Other levels of protection ==
Parts of the SAC lies within the Arnside and Silverdale Area of Outstanding Natural Beauty (designated in 1972), and the Lake District National Park.

Under the Wildlife and Countryside Act 1981 limestone pavement is subject to protection measures known as Limestone Pavement Orders.

Morecambe Bay Limestones are also designated as a National Character Area (NCA). In 2012 it was announced that Morecambe Bay Limestones and Wetlands would be one of twelve Nature Improvement Areas, an initiative to promote ecological connectivity and improve biodiversity.
