= Cartmel Fell =

Hamlet and civil parish in Cumbria, England

Coordinates: 54.283°N 2.896°W

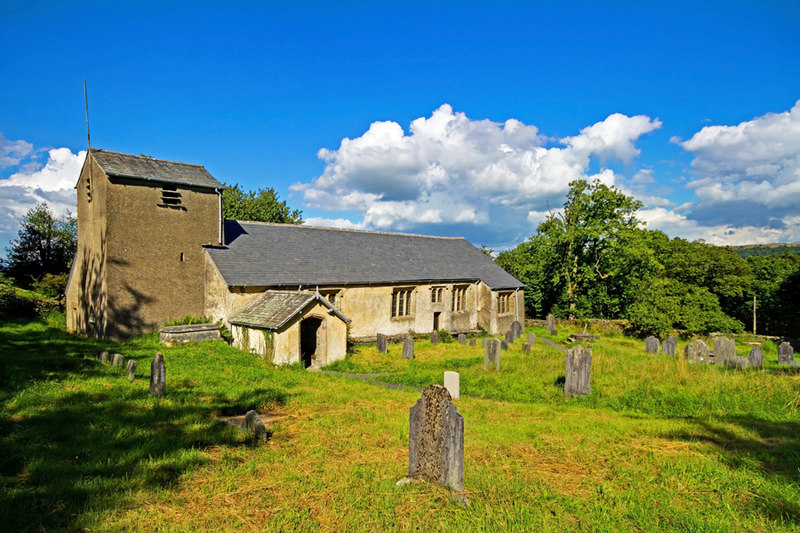
- St. Anthony's Church

- Location within Cumbria
- Population: 329 (2011)
- OS grid reference: SD4188
- Civil parish: Cartmel Fell
- Unitary authority: Westmorland and Furness
- Ceremonial county: Cumbria
- Region: North West
- Country: England
- Sovereign state: United Kingdom
- Post town: GRANGE-OVER-SANDS
- Postcode district: LA11
- Post town: WINDERMERE
- Postcode district: LA23
- Dialling code: 01539
- Police: Cumbria
- Fire: Cumbria
- Ambulance: North West
- UK Parliament: Westmorland and Lonsdale

Cartmel Fell is a hamlet and a civil parish in Westmorland and Furness, Cumbria, England. In the 2001 census the parish had a population of 309, increasing at the 2011 census to 329. The village of Cartmel and its church, Cartmel Priory, are not in this parish but in Lower Allithwaite to the south. Cartmel Fell church is about 7 miles (11 km) north of Cartmel Priory.

The neighbouring civil parishes are Windermere parish to the north west, where the boundary includes some of the shore line of Windermere; Crook to the north east; Crosthwaite and Lyth to the east; Witherslack to the south east; Lindale and Newton-in-Cartmel to the south; and Staveley-in-Cartmel to the south west.

St. Anthony's Church was built as a chapel of ease for Cartmel Priory in about 1504, and has changed little since. It contains some 17th-century box pews and a rare three-decker pulpit of 1698 as well as stained glass which may have come from Cartmel Priory.

There was a school next to St Anthony's Church that opened in 1871 and closed in 1971. The building is now the parish hall.

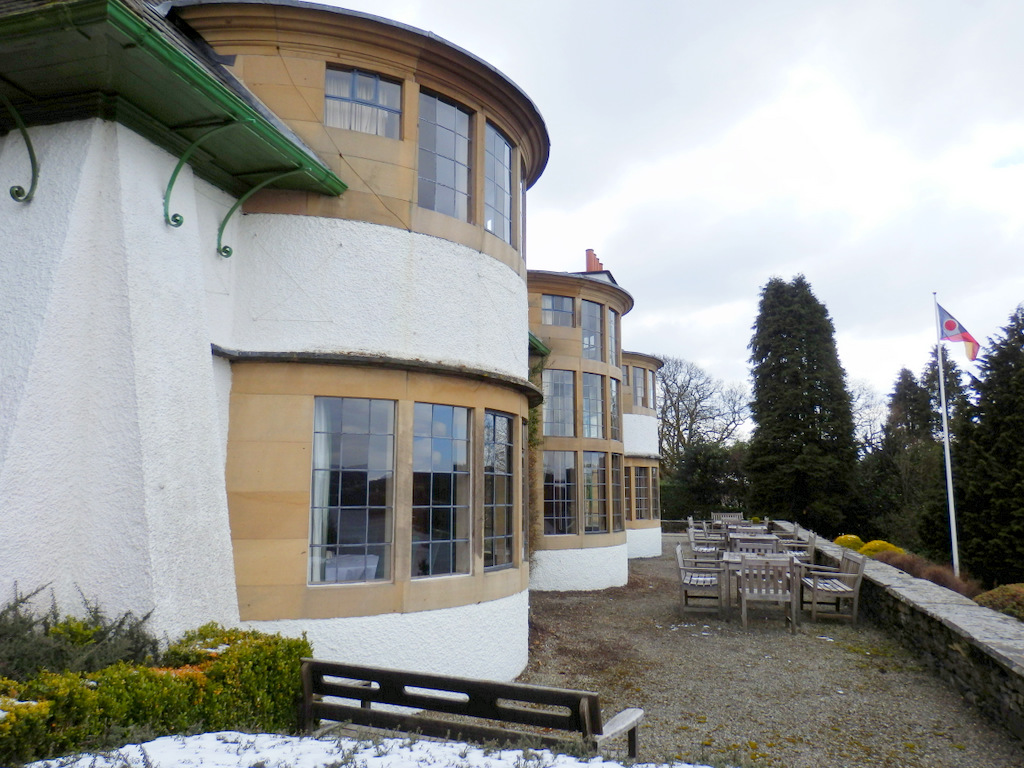
Grade I listed Broadleys by Voysey, 1898

There are 34 listed buildings in the parish. The church and two 1890s houses by C.F.A. Voysey (Broadleys and Moor Crag) are Grade I listed; Hodge Hill is Grade II* and the remaining houses, barns, bridge etc. are Grade II.

One mile (1.6 km) to the north-east, the Grade II* listed Cowmire Hall (in the parish of Crosthwaite and Lyth) incorporates a 16th-century pele tower, whilst the main block of the house dates from the 17th century. Also of note is Chapel House, Ravensbarrow Lodge, and Danes Court Cottage.

Cartmel Fell is the subject of a chapter of Wainwright's book The Outlying Fells of Lakeland. Wainwright names as Cartmel Fell the "elevated tangle of bracken and coppice forming [the Winster Valley]'s western flanks", and describes a walk from the church to the summit Raven's Barrow at 500 feet (150 m), which he calls "a lovely belvedere for viewing a lovely valley". He says that the cairn is locally known as Ravensbarrow or Rainsbarrow Old Man. To the northwest is Heights Tarn, a small lake on private land.

== See also ==
- Listed buildings in Cartmel Fell
