= Witherslack, Meathop and Ulpha =

Civil parish in Cumbria, England

Coordinates: 54.220°N 2.863°W

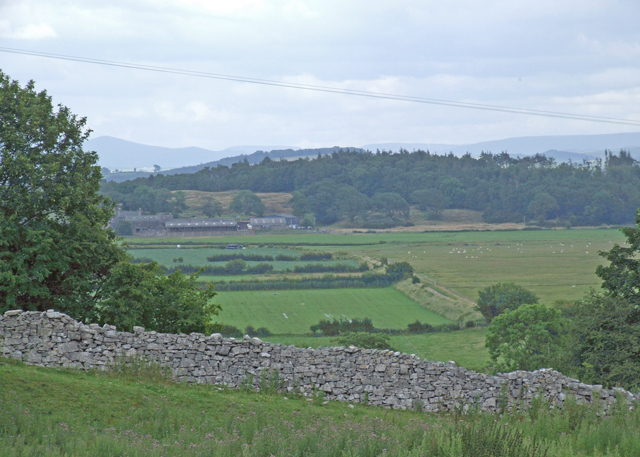
- Farmland near Meathop

- Location in South Lakeland Location within Cumbria
- Population: 653 (2011)
- OS grid reference: SD4380
- Civil parish: Witherslack, Meathop and Ulpha
- Unitary authority: Westmorland and Furness
- Ceremonial county: Cumbria
- Region: North West
- Country: England
- Sovereign state: United Kingdom
- Post town: GRANGE OVER SANDS
- Postcode district: LA11
- Dialling code: 015395
- Police: Cumbria
- Fire: Cumbria
- Ambulance: North West
- UK Parliament: Westmorland and Lonsdale

Witherslack, Meathop and Ulpha is a civil parish in the Westmorland and Furness district of the English county of Cumbria. Historically in Westmorland, it is located 3.6 miles (5.8 km) north east of Grange-over-Sands and 10.6 miles (17.1 km) south west of Kendal, between the confluence of the River Kent estuary and the River Winster. It was created following the amalgamation of former civil parishes Witherslack and Meathop and Ulpha on 1 April 2015. In 2011 there was a total population of 653. It includes the villages of Witherslack and Meathop.

== See also ==
- Listed buildings in Meathop and Ulpha
- Listed buildings in Witherslack
