= Farleton Knott =

Protected area in Cumbria, England

- Site of Special Scientific Interest
- Location of Farleton Knott.
- Area of search: Cumbria
- Grid reference: SD545800
- Coordinates: 54.213701°N 2.6991933°W
- Area: 702 acres (2.8 km^{2}; 1.1 sq mi)
- Notification date: 1988

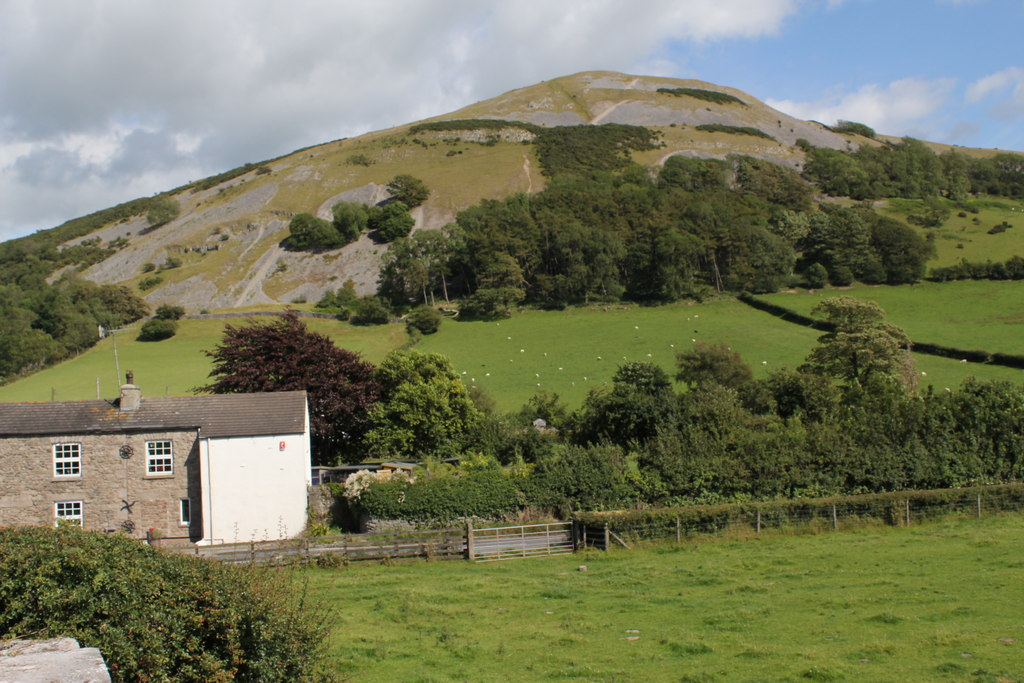
Farleton Fell

Farleton Knott is a Site of Special Scientific Interest (SSSI) in Cumbria, England. It is located 6km west of Kirkby Lonsdale, near Farleton. This protected area includes an exceptional limestone pavement on the top of a hill called Farleton Fell. Farleton Knott SSSI includes within its boundary Newbiggin Crags, Holme Park Fell and a National Nature Reserve called Clawthorpe Fell (Clawthorpe Fell is an island of limestone pavement within a quarry called Holme Park Quarry).

== Biology ==
Farleton Knott is a hill composed of carboniferous limestone where there is a limestone pavement. There are a range of habitats including open pavement, and pavement covered in scrub or woodland, calcareous grassland and limestone scree slopes. Herb species in this protected area include the orchid dark-red helleborine as well as bloody crane's-bill. Fern species include limestone fern, holly fern, rigid buckler-fern, maidenhair spleenwort, hart's-tongue fern and wall-rue. In calcareous grassland, herb species include thyme, dropwort, limestone bedstraw and squinancywort.

Scrub and tree cover is rather sparse at Farleton Knott SSSI because of grazing pressure, but ash, sycamore, hazel and hawthorn are frequent. Yew and juniper are also present.

== Geology ==
Farleton Knott SSSI is exceptional because limestone pavements are present on all sides of an isolated hill that stood in the path of glacial ice movement in the Pleistocene epoch. Some pavements are horizontal (e.g. Newbiggin Crags) and some pavements are inclined (e.g. Farleton Knott). Weathering has produced rundkarren (rounded channels formed when rock is covered by soil) and kamenitza (long standing pools on the rock surface) in this protected area.

== Land ownership ==
Part of the land within Farleton Knott SSSI is owned by the National Trust (this area is called Holme Park Fell). Both Holme Park Quarry and Clawthorpe Fell are owned by Aggregate Industries and have been managed by Cumbria Wildlife Trust since 2021.
