= Winster, Cumbria =

Village in Cumbria, England

Winster
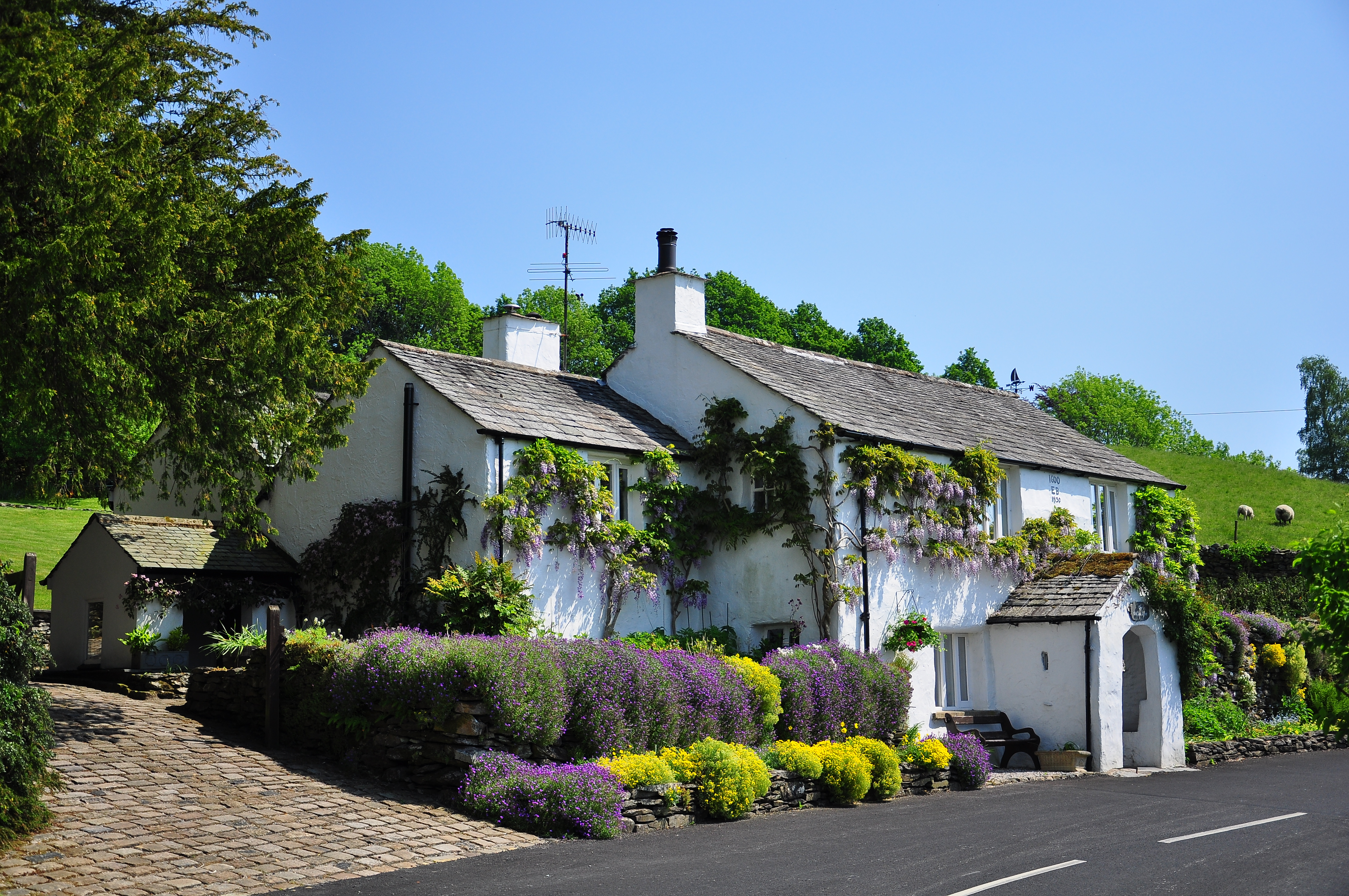
- Cottage in Winster

- Location within Cumbria
- Civil parish: Crook
- Unitary authority: Westmorland and Furness
- Ceremonial county: Cumbria
- Region: North West
- Country: England
- Sovereign state: United Kingdom
- Police: Cumbria
- Fire: Cumbria
- Ambulance: North West

Winster is a village in the civil parish of Crook, in the Westmorland and Furness unitary authority of the ceremonial county of Cumbria, England. Historically within the county of Westmorland, it is situated less than two miles east of Windermere, England's largest natural lake. The village is within the Lake District National Park. The village has a pub, the Brown Horse Inn, an 1850s coaching inn.

== Packhorse bridges ==
A packhorse bridge is a bridge intended to carry packhorses (horses loaded with sidebags or panniers) across a river or stream. There are two packhorse bridges near Winster. The Winster Bridge (1729 with 20th-century parapet) is on the River Winster at 54.3269°N 2.9021°W. Another packhorse bridge (probably 17th-century, also Grade II listed) is on a tributary of the River Winster at 54.3408°N 2.9051°W, adjacent to A5074 road.

== See also ==
- Listed buildings in Crook, Cumbria
- Bowland Bridge
- Bowness-on-Windermere
