= Scout Scar =

Hill in Cumbria, England

Coordinates: 54°19′32″N 2°47′25″W

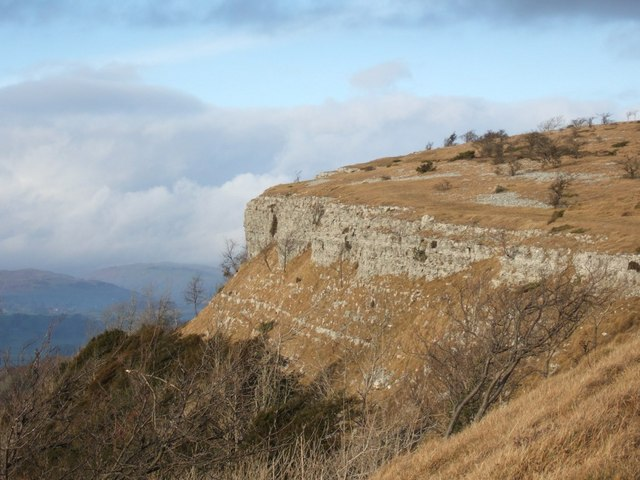
Scout Scar

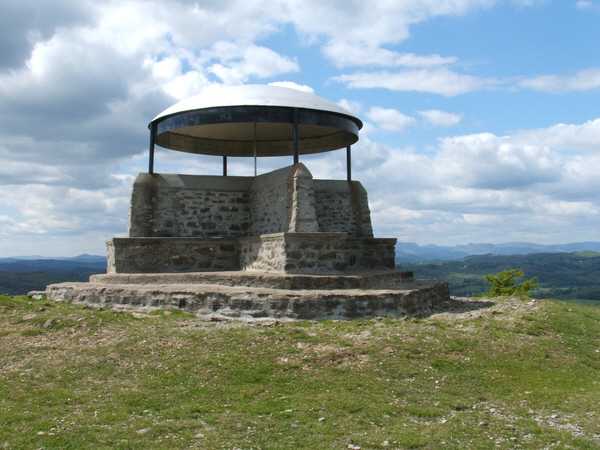
"The Mushroom": memorial shelter on Scout Scar

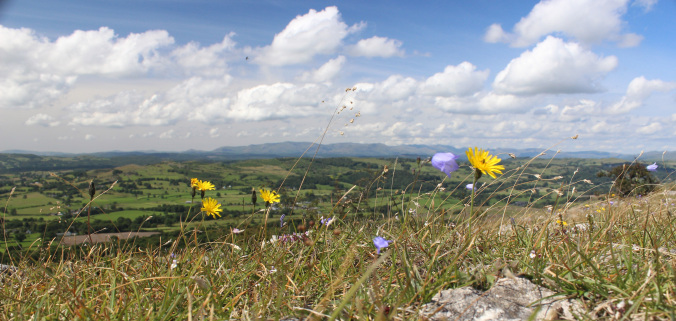
Limestone vegetation on Scout Scar

Scout Scar, also called Underbarrow Scar, is a hill in the English Lake District, west of Kendal, Cumbria and above the village of Underbarrow. It reaches 771 feet (235 m). Scout Scar is the subject of a chapter of Wainwright's book The Outlying Fells of Lakeland, but the summit he describes is a lower summit at 764 feet (233 m), 270m south of the highest point. Wainwright's anticlockwise recommended route also includes Cunswick Scar at 679 feet (207 m). The higher summit of Scout Scar has a topographic prominence of 109m and is thus classified as a HuMP, a hill with a prominence of at least 100m.

Scout Scar and Cunswick Scar are both formed of Carboniferous Limestone and dip gently towards the east with a steep western scarp slope.

At the lower, southern, summit there is a shelter, locally known as "The Mushroom". It was built in 1912 as a memorial to King George V, and restored in 1969 and again in 2003. The structure includes a toposcope indicating the Central Fells and other landmarks.

== Accessible route ==
There is a car park in an old limestone quarry not far from the summit of Scout Scar. The Lake District National Park Authority includes a walk on Scout Scar in its "Miles without stiles" project for accessible routes, and describes it as "A short, steep walk to one of the best views across the entire southern lakes". This route, accessible for "robust pushchairs", leads from the car park to a viewpoint below the top of the scar.

== Protection ==
Scout and Cunswick Scars have been designated a Site of Special Scientific Interest for their flora and fauna. In 2005 they were included in a multi-site Special Area of Conservation, Morecambe Bay Pavements, which includes other limestone outcrops in Cumbria and Lancashire.
