= Meathop Moss =

Bog in Cumbria, England

- IUCN category V (protected landscape/seascape)
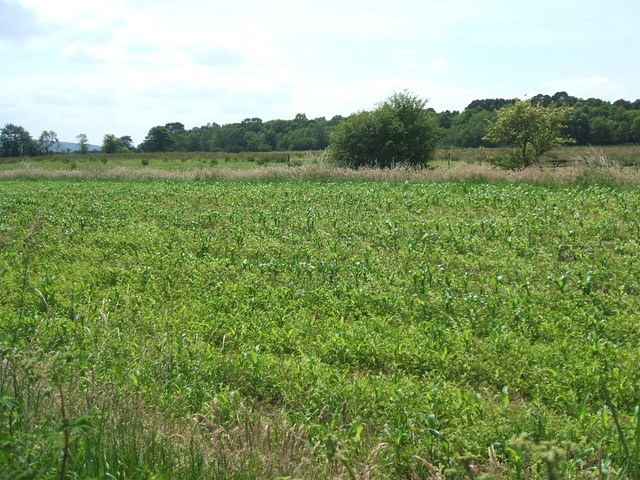
- The photo is taken outside the nature reserve looking towards the protected area
- Interactive map of Meathop Moss
- Location: Cumbria, England
- Coordinates: 54°13′39″N 2°51′29″W
- Area: 82 ha (200 acres)

Meathop Moss is a raised bog located north of Meathop in Cumbria, England. Protected as a nature reserve by the Cumbria Wildlife Trust, Meathop Moss is notable for its insect life. In 1965 it was designated a Site of Special Scientific Interest under the National Parks and Access to the Countryside Act 1949. Along with two other raised bogs near the Kent estuary, it was included in the Witherslack Mosses Special Area of Conservation which was designated in 2005.

== Etymology ==
Meathop is a locality near the village of Lindale. Moss is a dialect word meaning bog.

== History ==
The bog developed above a shingle beach after the last glaciation.

=== Charles Rothschild and the "Rothschild List" ===
The site was identified by the entomologist Charles Rothschild (1877–1923) as being of ecological importance. He was particularly interested in the site as the habitat of the large heath butterfly and the silver-studded blue. This was to lead to the creation of the nature reserve in 1919. Other than the prevention of the over-collection of butterflies, the reserve did not have a management plan. According to an article in Cumbrian Wildlife, the magazine of the Cumbria Wildlife Trust, the creation of the reserve was not driven by conservation in the modern sense, it was an example of rich collectors protecting their collecting sites from the riff-raff. However a more positive assessment could be made of the overall achievement of Rothschild in relation to conservation.

In 1899 Rothschild (at the age of 22) bought Wicken Fen and presented it to the National Trust: it was arguably Britain's first nature reserve. He organized surveys of other sites deserving protection and a "Rothschild list" of 284 sites in Britain and Ireland, including Meathop Moss, was drawn up. It was published in 1915 by the Society for the Promotion of Nature Reserves (the forerunner of The Wildlife Trusts). In the century after the surveys took place many of these habitats became degraded. Meathop Moss received more protection than most, being leased by the society as a nature reserve.

=== SSSI ===
In 1965 it was designated a Site of Special Scientific Interest.

=== Cumbria Wildlife Trust ===
The Cumbria Wildlife Trust, which was created in the 1960s as the Lake District Naturalists' Trust, took on the reserve. However, the Trust did not purchase the reserve until 1998. It was helped by the Heritage Lottery Fund.
