= Moor Crag =

Grade I listed building in Cumbria, England

Coordinates: 54.32427°N 2.93683°W

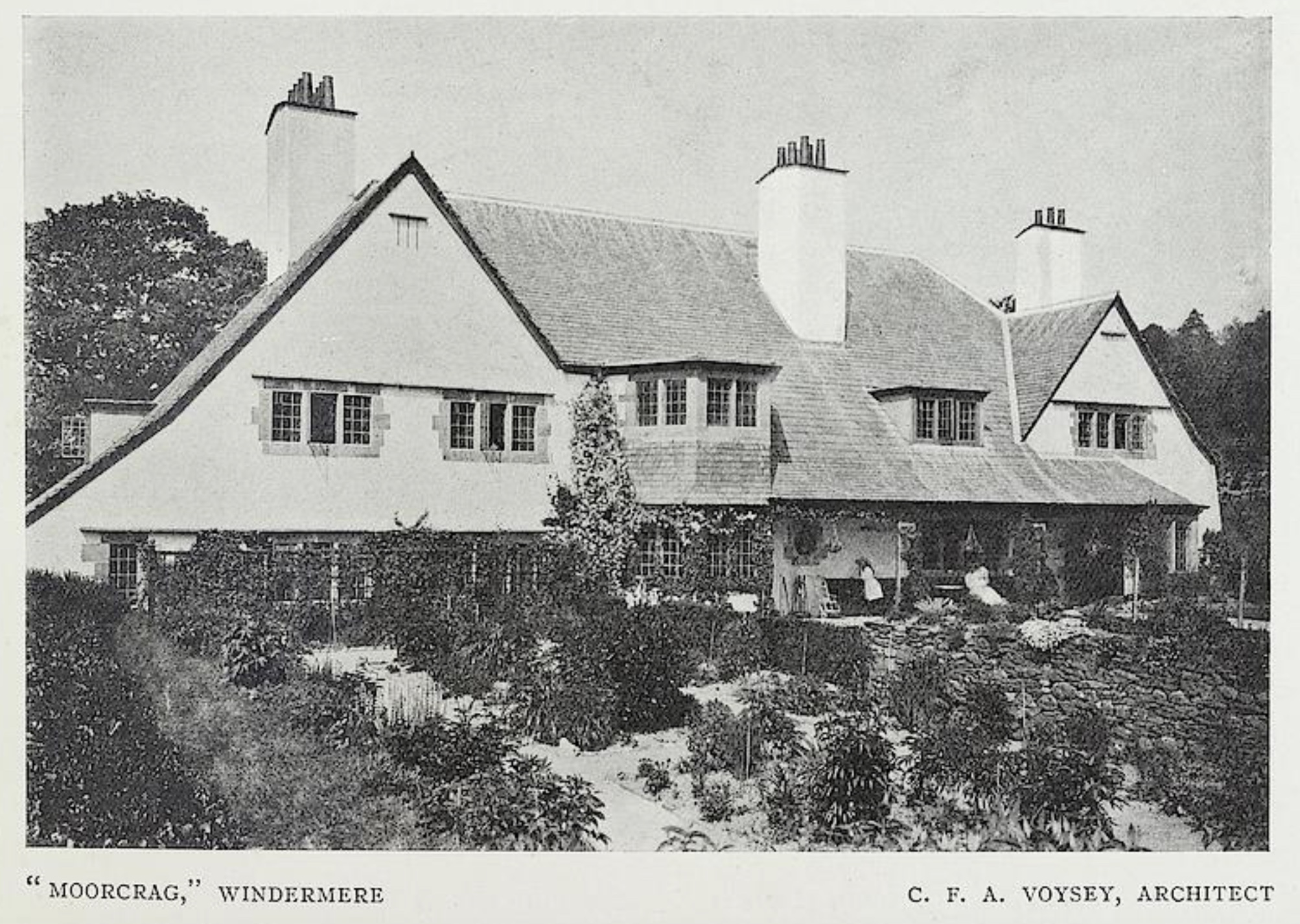
Moorcrag in the Studio Yearbook, 1907

Moor Crag (sometimes Moorcrag) is a Grade I listed house near Bowness-on-Windermere in Westmorland and Furness, Cumbria, England, overlooking Windermere. It lies in the north of the parish of Cartmel Fell. It was designed by C. F. A. Voysey in 1898-1899 as a holiday home for J. W. Buckley of Altrincham.

Duncan Simpson in his 1979 work C.F.A. Voysey: an architect of individuality describes Moor Crag as "The single most important house designed by Voysey".

== See also ==
- Grade I listed buildings in Cumbria
- Listed buildings in Cartmel Fell
