= Listed buildings in Crook, Cumbria =

Crook is a civil parish in the Westmorland and Furness district of Cumbria, England. It contains 19 listed buildings that are recorded in the National Heritage List for England. All the listed buildings are designated at Grade II, the lowest of the three grades, which is applied to "buildings of national importance and special interest". The parish is in the Lake District National Park to the east of the southern part of Windermere. It contains the villages of Crook and Winster, and is otherwise rural. Most of the listed buildings are houses with associated structures, farmhouses, and farm buildings. The other listed buildings are the tower of a disused church, a packhorse bridge, a public house, and a school.

== Buildings ==
Name and location	Photograph	Date	Notes
Hollin Hall; 54.35693°N 2.82367°W		14th century	The oldest part of the house is a former pele tower, the central block dating from the late 16th or early 17th century, and an extension being added in the late 17th or early 18th century. The house is in stone, partly roughcast, with green slate roofs. On the front is a 20th-century porch, and the windows are of various types. The former tower has a basement with a tunnel vault, a doorway and a window above, both with pointed arches, and a crow-stepped gable.
Post Office; 54.33796°N 2.89946°W		1600	A rendered stone house with a slate roof, two storeys, two bays, and a lower extension to the left. In the centre is a stone gabled porch with a slate roof containing stone benches. To the right is a 19th-century shop window, and the other windows are 20th-century casements.
Tower of St Catherine's Church; 54.34450°N 2.84781°W		1620	The rest of the church was demolished in 1887 when a new church was built on a different site. The tower is in stone, and has a blocked doorway with a segmental head and a partly blocked segmental arch on the ground floor, two slit windows above, rectangular bell openings with louvres, and a plain parapet. The tower is also a Scheduled Monument.
Barker Knott; 54.34267°N 2.91686°W	—	17th century	A stone farmhouse with a green slate roof and two storeys. On the front are two stone porches with ogee arches and containing stone benches. The doorways have chamfered surrounds. Most of the windows are casements, and there is one fixed window in the ground floor.
Bellman House, granary and barn 54.33963°N 2.91596°W	—	17th century	The house and outbuildings are in stone with green slate roofs. The house has two storeys, five bays, horizontally-sliding sash window, and is linked to a granary extension to the east. At right angles to the west is a hay-barn and cow house, above which is a gallery approached by external steps. The barn contains unglazed timber windows and ventilation slits.
Bryan Houses Cottage; 54.32794°N 2.89898°W		17th century	A stone house with a green slate roof and two storeys. On the front is a stone gabled porch containing stone benches. There is one sash window, and the others are casements.
High Mill House; 54.33945°N 2.90344°W	—	17th century	A roughcast house that has an eaves cornice with moulded modillions, and a green slate roof. There are two storeys and four bays. Most of the windows are sashes.
Michelland House and outbuildings 54.34787°N 2.87285°W	—	17th century (probable)	The former outbuildings have been incorporated into the house. It is in rendered stone with protruding through stones, a slate roof, two storeys, and a massive chimney stack on the right. On the front is a gabled porch, the windows are sashes, and there is another porch on the front of the former outbuilding.
Pack Horse Bridge; 54.34082°N 2.90496°W		17th century (probable)	The packhorse bridge crosses the River Winster. It has a rubble core and slate voussoirs, and is about 4 feet (1.2 m) wide. There are no parapets, and it is partly derelict.
Beckside farmhouse and barns 54.35349°N 2.83510°W		Late 17th century	The oldest part is the farmhouse, it was later extended and the barns added. They are built in stone, the farmhouse is rendered, and the roofs are in Lakeland slate. The farmhouse has two storeys and six bays. On the front is a gabled porch, the windows are casements, and a cruck blade is encased in the east gable wall. Adjacent to the farmhouse is a barn with two storeys and an L-shaped plan, the upper storey reached by a ramp. It contains various openings, including entrances, slit vents, and owl holes. To the west is a single-storey barn that has similar openings.
Crook Foot Farmhouse and cottage 54.33383°N 2.87516°W	—	Late 17th century (probable)	The farmhouse and cottage are in roughcast stone with protruding through stones, a green slate roof, and two storeys, and they form a T-shaped plan. On the front is a gabled porch, there is one fixed window, and the other windows are casements.
Thorneyfields Farmhouse and outbuilding 54.33734°N 2.87699°W	—	Late 17th century	The farmhouse and former outbuilding have been converted into one dwelling. It is in rendered stone, and has a green slate roof with stone ridge tiles, and two storeys. To the right is a massive chimney stack, and the windows are casements. Inside the house is an inglenook.
Barn, Barker Knott Farm; 54.34262°N 2.91655°W	—	18th century (probable)	The barn probably originated as a hay loft over a stable, and is in stone with a green slate roof. Above the entrance is a slated canopy, and to the right is a 19th-century single-storey washhouse with a hipped roof.
Outbuilding, Hollin Hall; 54.35687°N 2.82410°W	—	18th century (probable)	The outbuilding originated as a cow house and a hay loft. It is in stone with quoins and a slate roof. The openings have lintels in stone or in oak.
Low Fold Farmhouse; 54.33497°N 2.84761°W	—	18th century	The farmhouse was originally a house and a cottage, the latter possibly from an earlier date, that have been combined into one dwelling. It is roughcast, with a green slate roof and blue glazed roof tiles, and it has two storeys. The former house has sash windows and a 20th-century porch with a mounting block to the right. The former cottage has a doorway with a slate canopy, casement windows in the ground floor, and sashes above.
Barn, Low Fold Farm; 54.33498°N 2.84729°W	—	18th century (probable)	The barn is in stone with quoins, protruding through stones, and a slate roof. It has two storeys, and a ramp leads up to an entrance in the north face.
Sun Inn; 54.34880°N 2.82532°W		Late 18th century (probable)	The public house has incorporated former cottages. It is roughcast with a slate roof, two storeys, and seven bays. On the front is a 20th-century porch, and there are three other entrances. Apart from one fixed window, all the windows are sashes.
Winster School; 54.32972°N 2.89767°W		1849	The school is in stone with quoins. and it has a green slate roof with stone ridge tiles. There is one storey, two bays, and a low extension to the right. On the left is a gabled porch with decorative bargeboards. There is one fixed window, and all the others are sashes.
Barn, Michelland House; 54.34817°N 2.87255°W	—	19th century	The farm building is in slate with quoins and a slate roof. It consists of a bank barn and cow house with a threshing floor above, and to the west is a stable with a hayloft above.
