= Hollin Hall, Cumbria =

Coordinates: 54.3569°N 2.8237°W

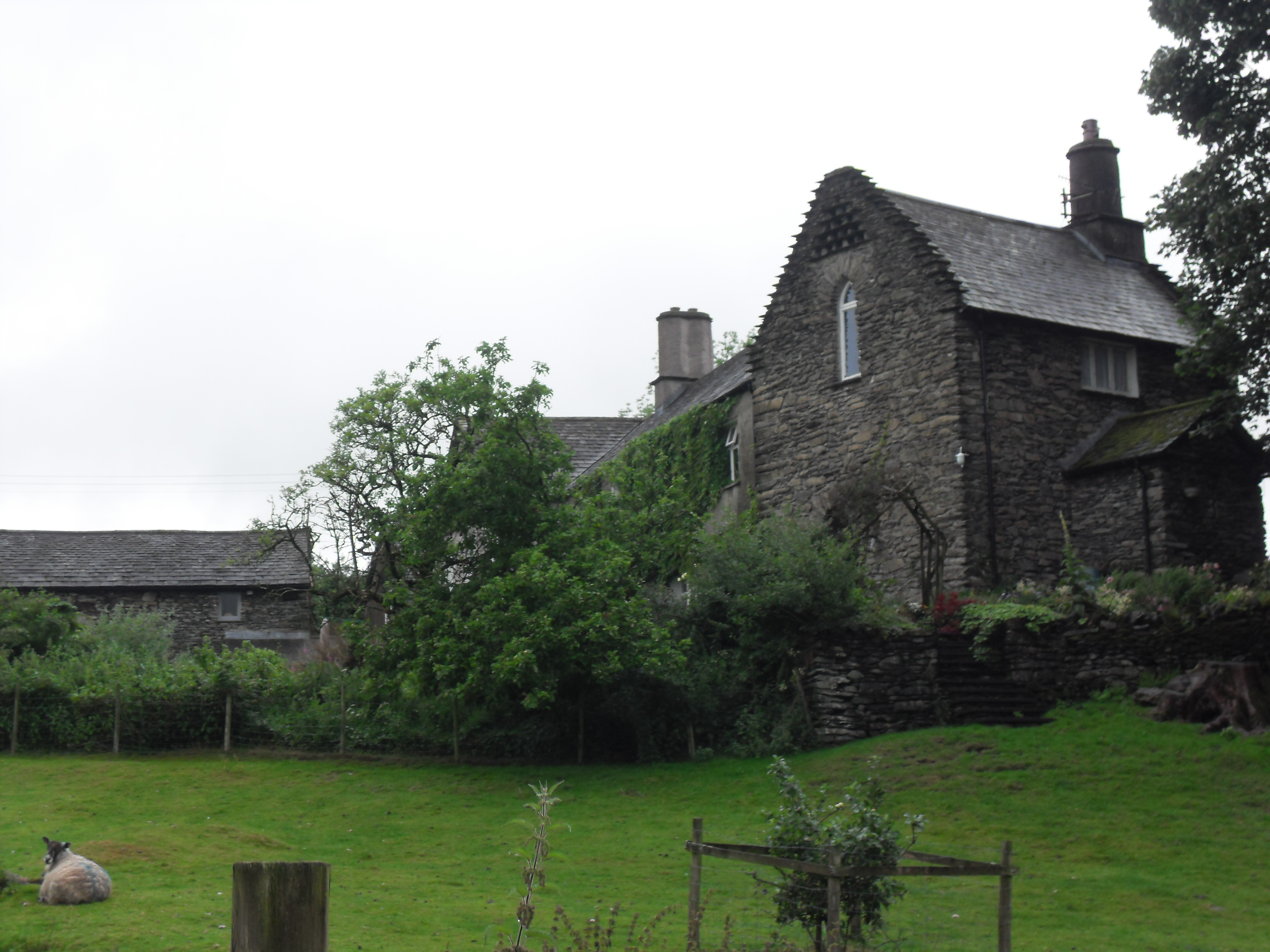
Hollin Hall

Hollin Hall is a country house in Crook in Cumbria. It is a Grade II listed building.

== History ==
The hall, formerly called Thwatterden Hall, is a 14th-century pele tower with crow-stepped gables, built by Robert Philipson with a 16th or 17th century main block and a 17th or 18th century West wing attached. In the mid 17th century Captain Myles Philipson commanded the local forces from Westmorland under Lord Clifford and then, a few years later, Captain Bernard Philipson served with the English army in Holland. The house was acquired by the Braithwaite family, then by the Moore family and after that by the Fleming family who rented it out to farmers. It remains a farmhouse.

== See also ==
- Listed buildings in Crook, Cumbria
