= Broad Leys =

Grade I listed building in Cumbria, England

Coordinates: 54.331785°N 2.934640°W

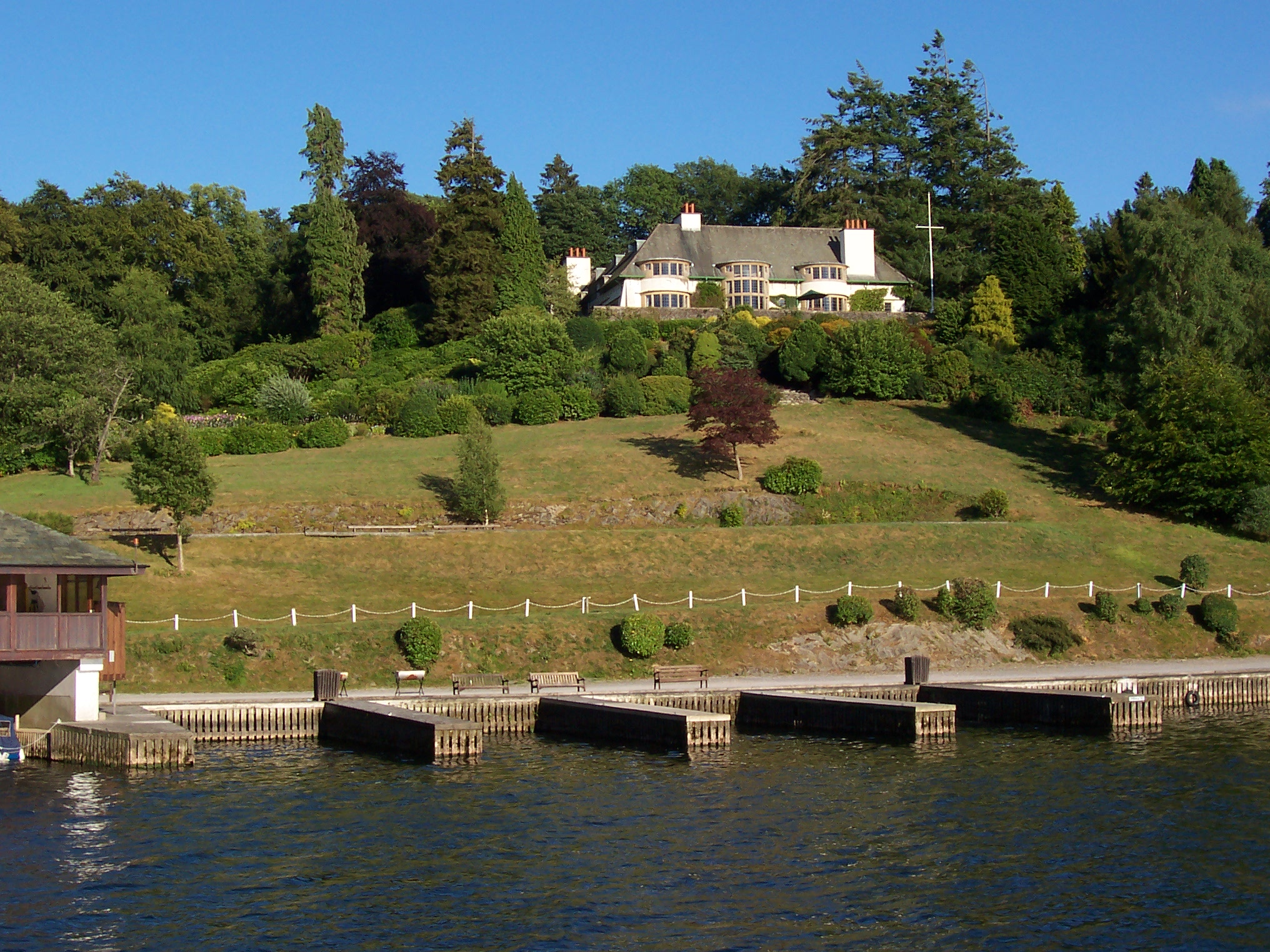
Broad Leys house, today headquarters of the Windermere Motor Boat Racing Club

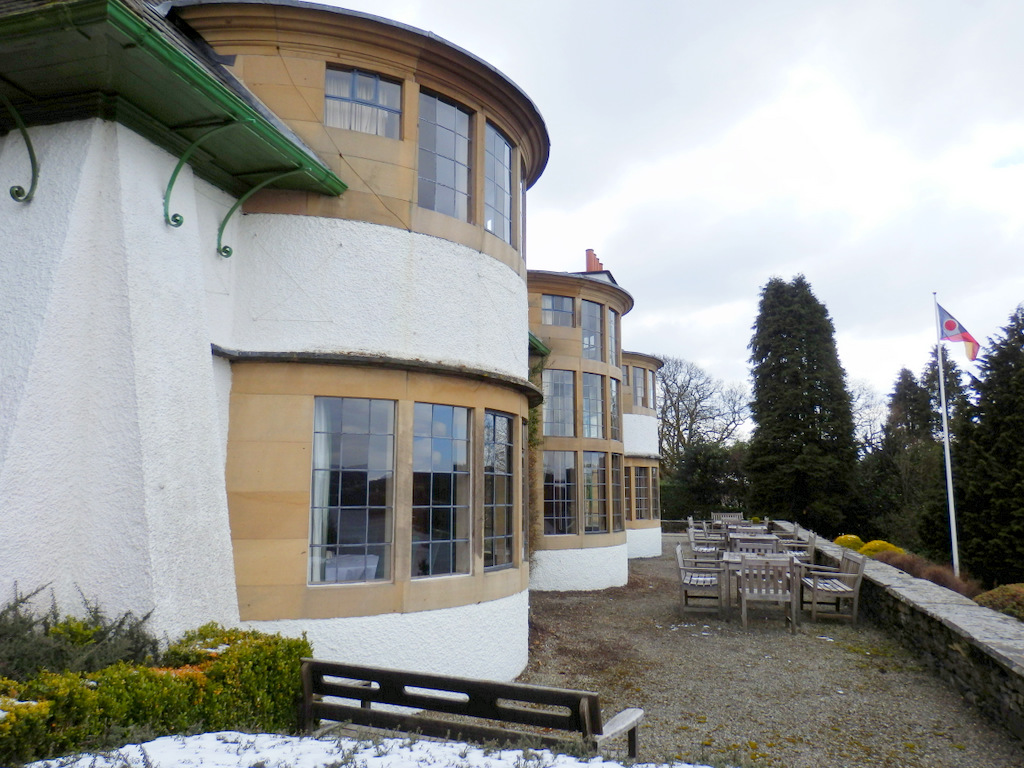
View of the terrace (2013)

Broad Leys is a house located in Ghyll Head, near Bowness-on-Windermere, Westmorland and Furness, Cumbria, England. It is in the northern part of the parish of Cartmel Fell.

Commissioned in 1898 for Arthur Currer Briggs of Yorkshire, the first mine owner to employ a profit-sharing plan for his workers and later Mayor of Leeds it was designed by renowned architect Charles Voysey and is considered one of his masterpieces. It was later purchased by the owners of Kendal Milne, a department store in Manchester and is now owned by Windermere Motor Boat Racing Club. It was constructed in an Arts and Crafts style.

It was acquired by the Windermere Motor Boat Racing Club in 1950 and became the home of powerboat racing on Windermere, until the introduction of a 10 miles per hour (16 km/h) speed limit in 2005. Following discussions with the LDNPA exemption has been granted for racing on Windermere since 2013 and this allows the club to race from Broad Leys on specific days of the year.

The building is Grade I listed.

It was used as the location for the conclusion of the film The French Lieutenant's Woman (1981) and for the Agatha Christie's Poirot television episode "Dumb Witness" (1996). Despite it being a private club, members of the public are able to stay in the house by prior arrangement.

== See also ==
- Grade I listed buildings in Cumbria
- Listed buildings in Cartmel Fell
