= St Anthony's Church, Cartmel Fell =

Coordinates: 54.2849°N 2.8977°W

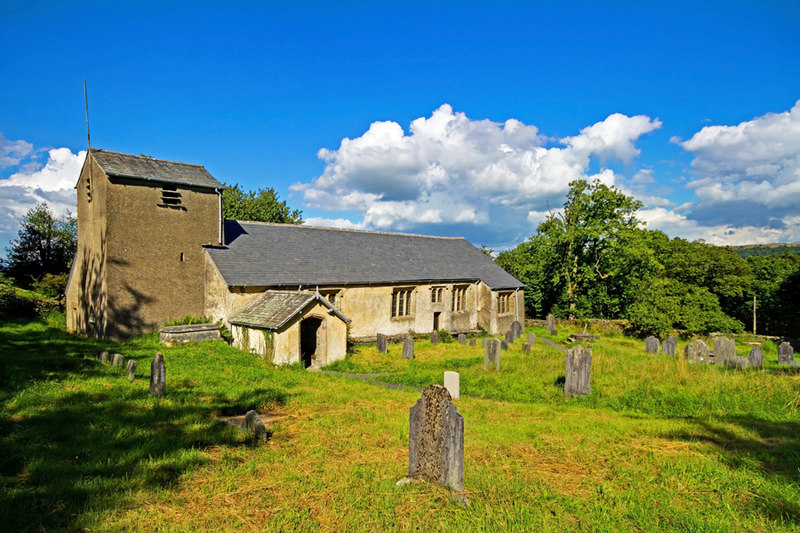
- St Anthony's Church, Cartmel Fell, from the southwest

- Location in Cumbria
- OS grid reference: SD 417 881
- Location: Cartmel Fell, Cumbria
- Country: England
- Denomination: Anglican
- Website: St Anthony, Cartmel Fell

History
- Status: Parish church

Architecture
- Functional status: Active
- Heritage designation: Grade I
- Designated: 25 March 1970
- Architectural type: Church
- Groundbreaking: c. 1504

Specifications
- Materials: Roughcast stone, slate roofs

Administration
- Province: York
- Diocese: Carlisle
- Archdeaconry: Westmorland and Furness
- Deanery: Kendal
- Parish: Cartmel Fell

Clergy
- Vicar: Revd Michael Woodcock

St Anthony's Church, is in the village of Cartmel Fell, Cumbria, England. It is an active Anglican parish church in the deanery of Kendal, the archdeaconry of Westmorland and Furness, and the diocese of Carlisle. The church is recorded in the National Heritage List for England as a designated Grade I listed building. Just to the southeast is Ravensbarrow Lodge.

== History ==
St Anthony's was built in about 1504 as a chapel of ease to Cartmel Priory. Lateral extensions were added to the north and south at the east end of the church in about 1520. The south porch was added in the 16th century, and the vestry probably in the 18th century. The church was restored in 1911 by John Curwen.

== Architecture ==
=== Exterior ===
It is a long and low church standing on a hillside. Constructed in roughcast stone with ashlar dressings, it has slate roofs. Its plan consists of a three-bay nave and a chancel in a single range, a south porch, north and south extensions at the east end, and a west tower with a northeast vestry. The tower has a saddleback roof, a blocked west doorway with an inserted window, and louvred bell openings. Along the south wall of the church are three-light straight-headed windows, and a priest's door with a two-light window above it. The east window in the chancel has five lights, and there are two small square windows, one above the other, to its side. There are east and west entrances to the extension on the north side.

=== Interior ===
Under the tower is a baptistry containing a plain round font dated 1712. Three elaborate pews have been constructed for the church. The Cowmire Pew in the northeast of the church was probably created from a reredos and chancel screen in 1521. It was restored in 1911. It has possibly been used as a schoolroom, as there are inscribed calculation aids on a bench. To the east of this is a smaller pew dated 1696. In the southeast of the church is the Burblethwaite Pew, made in the 17th century, and reconstructed in 1810. Opposite is a three-decker pulpit dated 1698 with a tester. Also in the nave are Royal arms of 1781. In the chancel is an 18th-century three-sided communion rail. On the walls of the chancel are boards painted with the Lord's Prayer, the Creed, and the Ten Commandments. The east window contains stained glass dating from about 1520; this was restored in 1911. It contains depictions of St Anthony, St Leonard, the Crucifixion, and the Seven Sacraments. There are also fragments of 16th-century glass in a north window.

== External features ==
In the churchyard is a rectangular stone block with a rounded end and three steps. This is thought to have been the base of a sundial, or possibly a mounting block, and is listed at Grade II.

== See also ==
- Grade I listed churches in Cumbria
- Grade I listed buildings in Cumbria
- Listed buildings in Cartmel Fell
