= Heights Tarn =

Reservoir in the United Kingdom

- Location in the Lake District National Park Location in South Lakeland, Cumbria
- Location: Lake District of Cumbria, England
- Coordinates: 54°17′17″N 2°55′18″W
- Basin countries: England
- Max. length: 290 m (950 ft)
- Max. width: 73 m (240 ft)
- Surface area: 1.5 ha (3.7 acres)
- Surface elevation: 208 m (682 ft)

Heights Tarn is a small lake to the east of Windermere and north of Simpson Ground Reservoir, near Cartmel Fell, in the Lake District of Cumbria, England. Located at an altitude of 208 m (682 ft), the lake has an area of 1.5 hectares (3.7 acres), and measures 290 m × 73 m (951 ft × 240 ft). Although just off the main road, the lake is not accessible to the public, lying on private land and contains a boathouse on its eastern bank. About 400 metres to the south is Sow How Tarn.
