= Listed buildings in Witherslack =

Witherslack is a former civil parish, now in the parish of Witherslack, Meathop and Ulpha, in the Westmorland and Furness district of Cumbria, England. It contained 15 listed buildings that are recorded in the National Heritage List for England. Of these, one is listed at Grade II*, the middle of the three grades, and the others are at Grade II, the lowest grade. The parish is in the Lake District National Park, it is mainly rural, and contains the village of Witherslack and the surrounding countryside. The listed buildings consist of farmhouses, farm buildings, houses and associated structures, a church with items in the churchyard, a bridge, a war memorial, and two limekilns.

== Key ==
Grade	Criteria
II*	Particularly important buildings of more than special interest
II	Buildings of national importance and special interest

== Buildings ==
Name and location	Photograph	Date	Notes	Grade
Nether Hall Farmhouse; 54.25228°N 2.86243°W		16th or 17th century (probable)	The farmhouse is in stone, mainly roughcast, and has a slate roof. The south front, which was rebuilt in the 20th century, has two storeys and three bays, and contains casement windows. On the north front is a mullioned window and a buttress. The east front has three bays, the right bay with a single storey, and it contains casement windows. Inside the north wing is a full cruck truss.	II
St Paul's Church; 54.25028°N 2.87365°W		1668–69	In 1768 the church was heightened and a vestry added. It is built in stone with a slate roof, and consists of a nave and a chancel in one vessel, a south porch, a north vestry, and a west tower. The tower has a stepped base and a projecting embattled parapet. The porch has a coped gable with a ball finial, and a round-headed entrance with a moulded surround and a hood mould. Along the sides the windows have mullions and transoms, and they contain three lights. The east window has a segmental head and five lights.	II*
Low Fell End Farmhouse; 54.25103°N 2.84420°W	—	17th or early 18th century (probable)	The farmhouse, which is in roughcast stone with slate roofs, was extended in the 19th century. There are two storeys and four bays, the right two bays forming the extension and higher. The windows in the left two bays are sashes, in the right two bays they are casements, and there is a mullioned fire window in the right bay. At the rear is an outshut and a gabled wing with external steps leading to a doorway in the upper floor.	II
Halecat Cottage; 54.24743°N 2.87387°W	—	Early 18th century (probable)	A stone house, partly roughcast, with a slate roof. It has two storeys with an attic, two bays, and lean-to outshuts on the left and at the rear. On the front is a porch with a swept gabled roof, and the doorway has a chamfered surround. The windows on the front are mullioned and transomed. In the right return is a small-paned window and an oriel window.	II
Gate piers and overthrow, St Paul's Church; 54.24997°N 2.87351°W		18th century (probable)	The gate piers at the entrance to the churchyard are in ashlar stone and have a square plan, decorative panels, and pine-cone finials. The overthrow is in twisted wrought iron and it supports a lantern, and the decorative gates date from the late 20th century.	II
Barn, Middlelow Wood; 54.27078°N 2.88210°W	—	18th century (probable)	The barn is in stone with a slate roof. There is a lean-to outshut to the west containing two stable doors and garage doors. The entrance is in the north gable end.	II
Witherslack Hall Farmhouse; 54.26670°N 2.86767°W	—	Mid 18th century	A roughcast house with modillioned eaves and a slate roof with coped gables. The south front has two storeys and five bays, and contains windows with small-paned glazing. In the centre is a gabled slate canopy. At the rear is a single-story gabled wing with an attic, and an outshut, and most of the windows are sashes.	II
Sundial; 54.25011°N 2.87334°W	—	1757	The sundial is in the churchyard of St Paul's Church. It is in ashlar stone, and consists of a round column on a square base on three square steps. On the top is a square plate and a gnomon.	II
Bleacrag Bridge; 54.24638°N 2.88764°W	—	1816 (probable)	The bridge carries Holme Road over the River Winster. It is in stone, and consists of a single elliptical arch. The bridge has straight parapets with limestone coping, and on the south side is an inscribed plaque and a benchmark.	II
Catcrag Lime Kiln; 54.23206°N 2.86780°W	—	Early 19th century	The limekiln is in carboniferous limestone and is built into a limestone outcrop. It has a square plan and a central semicircular-arched opening leading to a semicircular arch with limestone voussoirs. The draw hole has canopy flagstones, and the interior of the chamber is lined with sandstone.	II
Limekiln at SD 428 848; 54.25637°N 2.87940°W	—	1843	The limekiln is in limestone and has a square plan and sloping sides. On the north face is an elliptical-arched fire hole with a datestone above. The chamber is lined with brick.	II
Summer house 54.24432°N 2.86960°W	—	Mid to late 19th century (probable)	The summer house is in the garden of Halecat House, and is in stone with a slate roof. It has an octagonal plan and a pyramidal roof with a weathervane. On the sides are ogee headed openings, and the glazing incorporates fragments of 17th or 18th-century stained glass.	II
Farm buildings, Witherslack Hall Farm; 54.26657°N 2.86794°W	—	Mid to late 19th century (probable)	The farm buildings are in limestone with roofs of slate or corrugated iron. They form a quadrilateral plan around a courtyard, with wings to the north and east. Most of the south range has one storey, and the other ranges have two, and in the east range is a central through passage. The openings include windows, some of which are mullioned, stable doors, pitching holes, and a loading door.	II
Witherslack Hall and outbuilding 54.26811°N 2.86697°W		1874	This was built as a hunting lodge for the 15th Earl of Derby, it was designed by Paley and Austin, and later used as a school. It is in limestone with sandstone dressings and slate roofs. The building has an L-shaped plan, with a main block and service ranges to the north. The west wing has two storeys and seven bays, the outer two bays projecting forward with three storeys and an embattled parapet. In the angle between the ranges is a four-storey embattled tower with a stair turret. The windows are mullioned and transomed. Other features include gables, oriel windows, and dormers with finials.	II
War memorial 54.25030°N 2.87394°W		1921	The war memorial is in the churchyard of St Paul's Church. It is in grey granite, and is about 3.6 metres (12 ft) tall. The memorial consists of a wheel-head cross on a tapering, four-sided plinth with two-stepped square base that has rough-hewn edges. On the plinth is an inscription and the names of those lost in the two World Wars.	II
