= John Barwick =

English royalist churchman

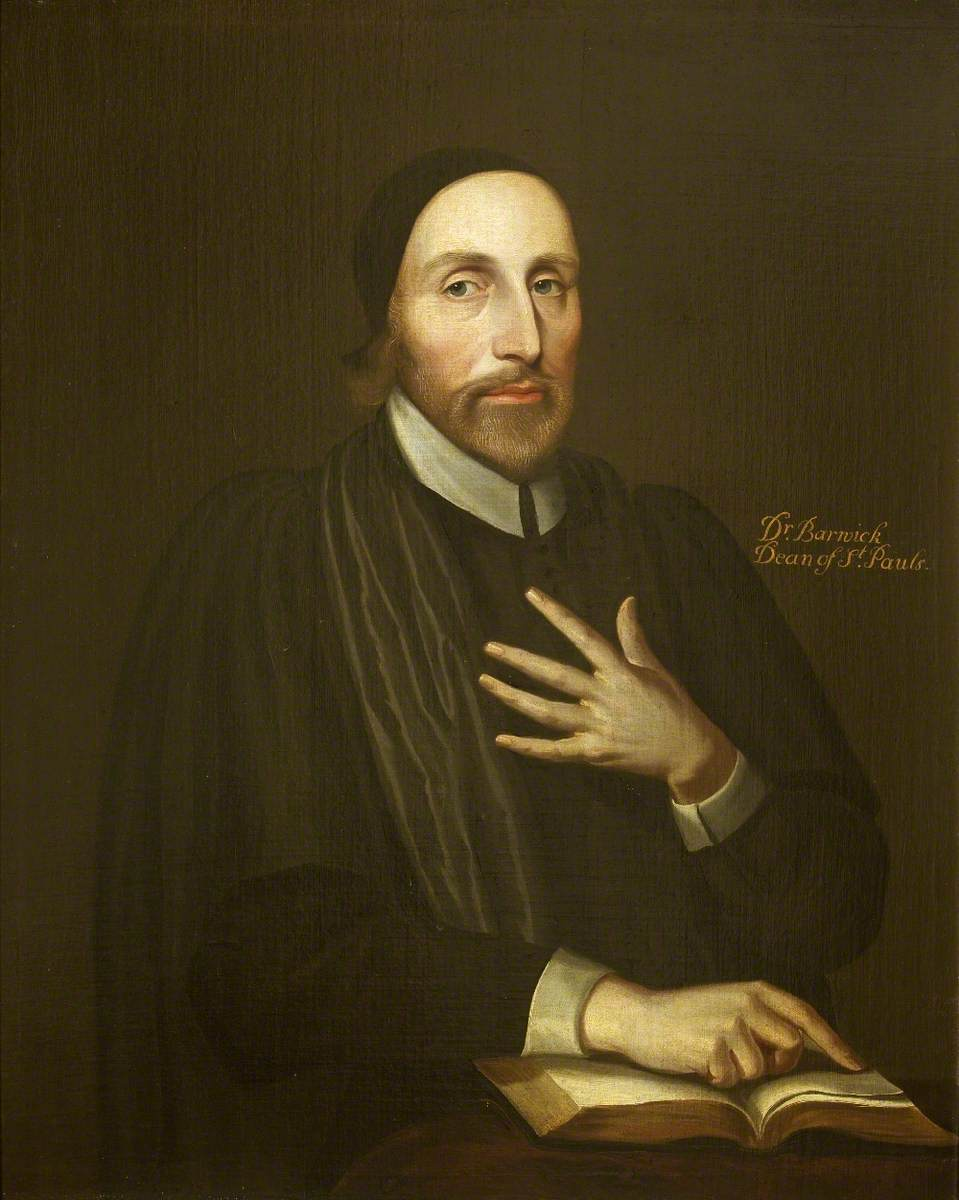
John Barwick

John Barwick (1612–1664) was an early English royalist churchman and Dean of St. Paul's Cathedral.

== Early life ==
He was born at Witherslack, in Westmorland. John was the third of five sons, and he and his brother Peter Barwick (later his biographer) were the ones given an education. After time at local grammar schools John was sent to Sedbergh School, then in Yorkshire. In 1631 he entered St. John's College, Cambridge, where Thomas Fothergill was his tutor, and graduated B.A. in 1635. The Master Owen Gwyn had died in 1634, and the subsequent election was disputed and attracted the attention of the king; Barwick became involved as the college's representative. He was then elected to a fellowship. He took holy orders, and in 1638 his M.A. degree.

== Civil War period ==
In 1642 royalists at Cambridge raised a sum of money for the king, and gathered together some college plate. Parliament received information of what was going on, and sent Oliver Cromwell with a party of infantry to a place called Lower Hedges, on the road between Cambridge and Huntingdon. A party of horse was formed under Barnabas Oley of Clare College, of which Barwick was one, who conveyed the treasure along back roads to Nottingham. Subsequently, Cromwell moved on Cambridge, taking over the castle. Two pamphlets were put together by Cambridge academics against Cromwell: the first was by Barwick with Isaac Barrow, Peter Gunning, and Samuel Ward; the second is attributed to Barwick alone.

Barwick left Cambridge, and became chaplain to Bishop Thomas Morton, who nominated him to a prebend at Durham Cathedral and the rectories of Houghton-le-Spring and Walsingham; Barwick in fact settled in London, since Morton at the time had no effective patronage. At Durham House Barwick undertook royalist correspondence and intelligence work, and tried to make converts of some parliamentarians. He worked for the Treaty of Newport of 1648, and was supported by his brothers Peter and Edward. In the end he was betrayed by a post-office official, and Barwick had to destroy his ciphers while arresting officers were breaking into his room. He was charged with high treason, and was committed (April 1650) first to the Gatehouse prison at Westminster, and then to the Tower of London. He was released, without any trial but in much better health, in August 1652.

He then spent a period moving in royalist circles, first with Bishop Morton, and residing for some months in the house of Sir Thomas Eversfield in Sussex. He finally settled in his brother Peter's house in St. Paul's Churchyard, and renewed his management of the king's correspondence. He visited John Hewit, preacher at St. Gregory's, when he was imprisoned for conspiring against Cromwell, and attended him on the scaffold (June 1658), when he received from him a ring with the motto "Alter Aristides", which he wore until his death. He was also with Bishop Morton in his last moments (22 September 1659), preached his funeral sermon, and wrote his life (1660). Barwick with Richard Allestree were concerned about the continuity of the episcopal succession of the Church of England, and in 1659 Barwick was riding about between the surviving bishops, gathering their opinions. He was then sent over by the bishops to report the state of church affairs to Charles II at Breda. There he preached before the king, and was appointed one of the royal chaplains.

== After the Restoration ==
After 1660 he did not return to his fellowship at St. John's, where he approved of his successor. He accepted the bishopric of Sodor and Man, only to step aside for a candidate sponsored by the Countess of Derby, and now unwilling to become a bishop was made Dean of Durham. In October 1661 he became Dean of St Paul's. He was one of the nine assistants of the bishops at the Savoy conference, and he was unanimously elected prolocutor of the lower house of convocation of the province of Canterbury. In 1662 his health began to fail, and he died in London from an attack of pleurisy, which carried him off in three days. He was attended by his old friend, Peter Gunning, who preached his funeral sermon, and Humphrey Henchman, Bishop of London, performed the obsequies. He was buried in St. Paul's Cathedral.
