= Peter Barwick =

English physician and author

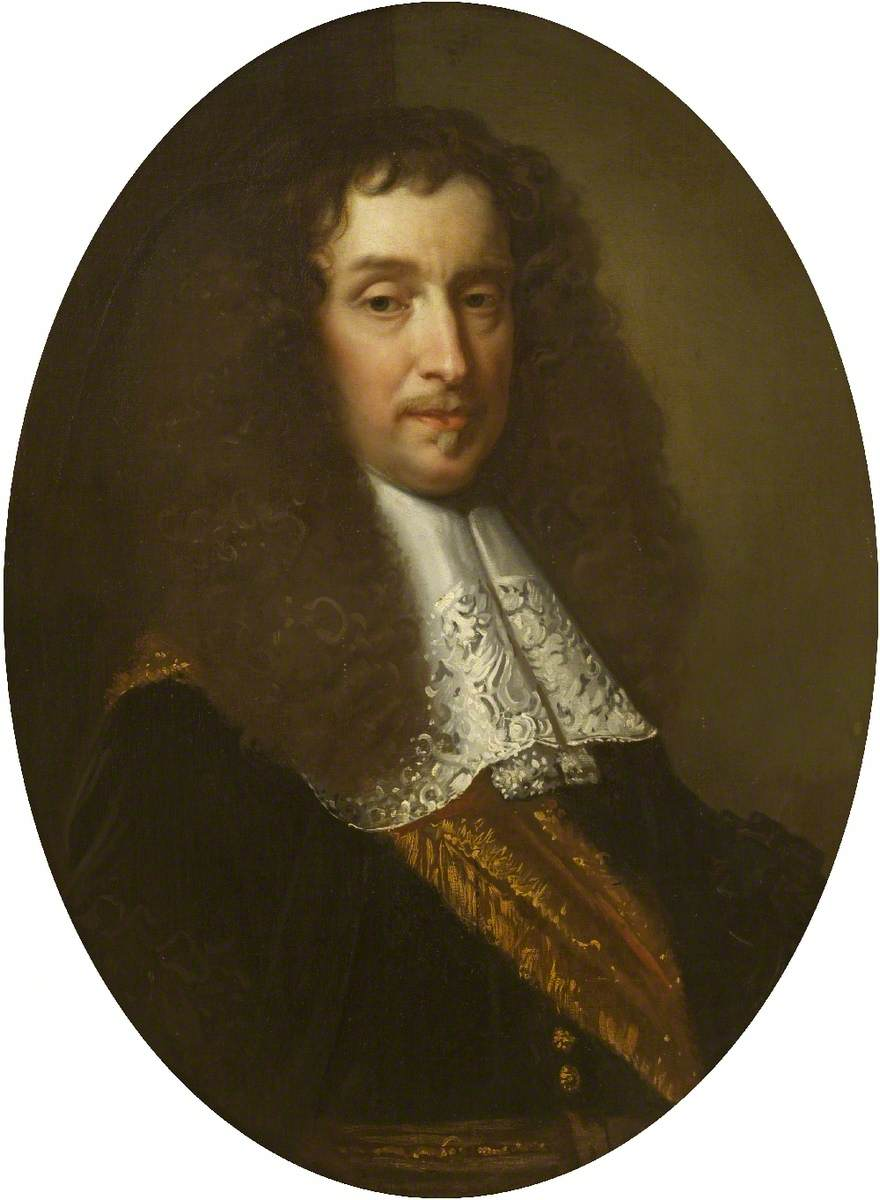
Peter Barwick by Jacob Huysmans

Peter Barwick (1619–1705) was an English physician and writer.

== Life ==
He was the younger brother of John Barwick, and like him was educated at Sedbergh School, and St John's College, Cambridge, where he was a foundation scholar. He was appointed by Bishop Matthew Wren to the fellowship at St John's, in the gift of the Bishop of Ely, but could not be admitted because of the troubled times. He was driven from Cambridge by the First English Civil War.

Barwick became tutor to Ferdinando Sacheverell, of Old Hayes in Leicestershire. He returned to Cambridge in 1647 to take his M.A. degree, and studied medicine. In 1651 he was at Worcester, meeting with Charles II of England, and receiving tokens of his favour; and like his brother he was a royalist supporter. In 1655 he received his M.D. degree, and in 1657 took a house in St. Paul's Churchyard. Here he was joined by his brother John, who daily read the proscribed service of the Church of England in the presence of a few royalists. About this time Peter married a Mrs. Sayon, a merchant's widow and a kinswoman of Archbishop William Laud. He was elected fellow of the College of Physicians 26 June 1655.

At the Restoration, he was made one of the king's physicians in ordinary, and was known in his profession particularly for his treatment of smallpox and all sorts of fevers. In 1661, Gilbert Sheldon, bishop of London, and the other bishops, deans, and archdeacons, met at his house, and proceeded to St Paul's Cathedral to open the first session of convocation for the revising of the Book of Common Prayer. When the Great Plague of London broke out in 1665, he was one of the few physicians who stayed; and he is mentioned by Nathaniel Hodges in his account of the plague Loimologia for his services in London, while attending the daily service at the cathedral and working with the clergy there.

Though the plague could not drive him from his home, the Great Fire of London did in 1666: his house was burned down with St Paul's, and he moved to the neighbourhood of Westminster Abbey. Here he lived for many years, on good terms with his neighbour Richard Busby, doing charity work and writing. He was censor of the College of Physicians in 1674, 1684, 1687, and ‘elect’ from 26 March 1685 to 6 November 1691. In 1694, his eyesight entirely failed him, and he gave up his practice; but he lived on for eleven years and died 4 September 1705.

== Works ==
He supported William Harvey's discovery of the circulation of the blood, and he is said to have written one of the best contemporary treatises on the subject. Barwick is now remembered for his life of his brother John, the dean. He began it in 1671, writing it in Latin, chiefly, it is said, for the sake of inserting the Latin disputation which his brother wrote for his D.D. degree.

To the ‘Life’ he added an appendix vindicating the royal authorship of Eikon Basilike. The ‘Vita Joannis Barwick’ was published in 1721 by Hilkiah Bedford, who also wrote an English translation of the work published in 1724, with notes. The manuscript of the life, with papers used in it, was deposited in the library of St John's College, Cambridge.

== Family ==
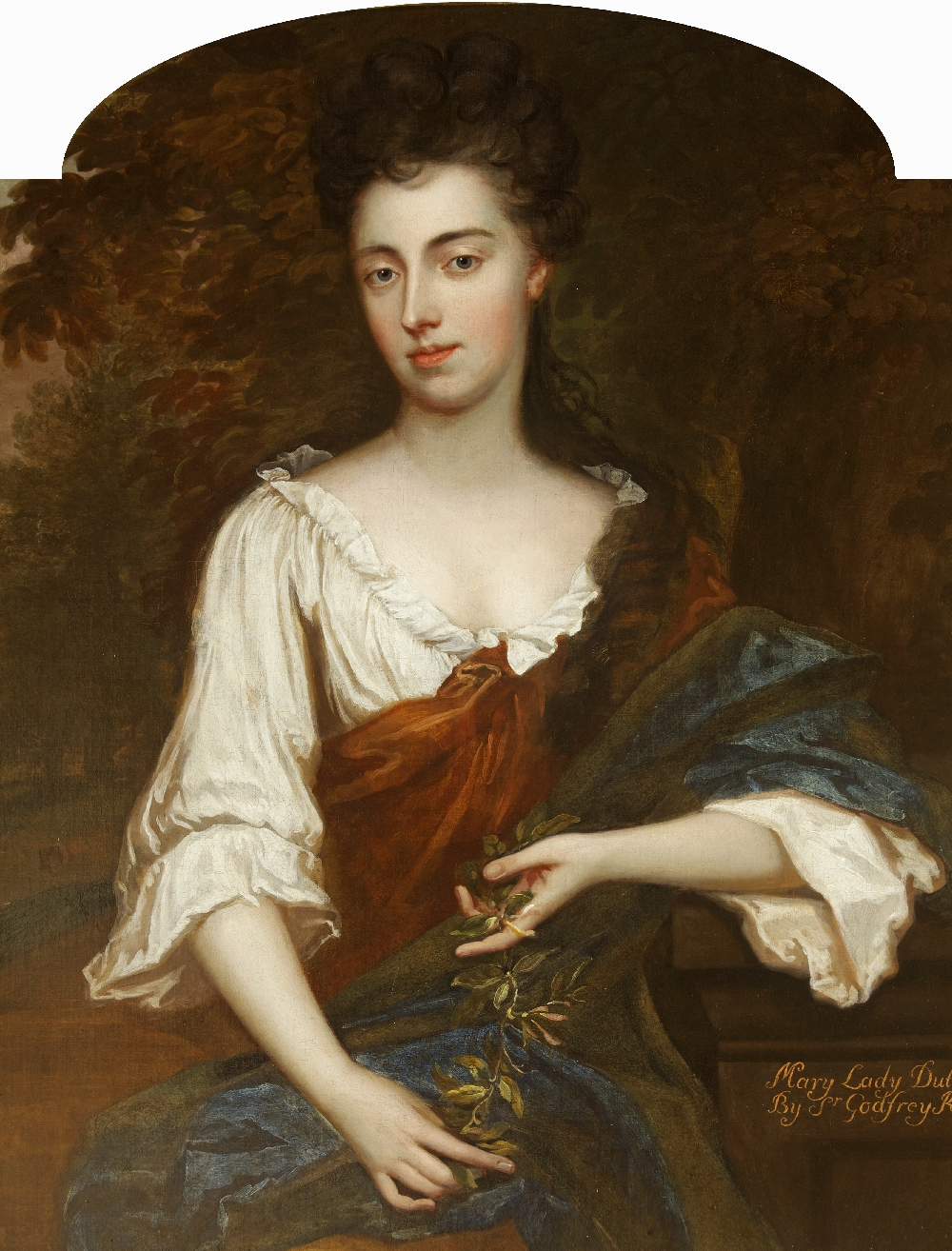
Peter Barwick and his wife Anne had one daughter: Mary (pictured).

Peter Barwick and his wife Anne had one daughter: Mary (1645-1723). On 14 Jan 1678 at Westminster Abbey, Mary married Ralph Dutton (1630-1720), who later that same year was created a baronet by Charles II (on 20 Jun 1678). Through Mary, Peter was the ancestor of the Barons Sherborne, the Earls of Lichfield, 3rd Creation, the Earls Howe, 2nd Creation, the Barons Digby (starting at the 9th/3rd Baron, Edward Digby) and the Earls of Dartmouth.

== Notes ==
Attribution

This article incorporates text from a publication now in the public domain: "Barwick, Peter". Dictionary of National Biography. London: Smith, Elder & Co. 1885–1900.
