= Cunswick Scar =

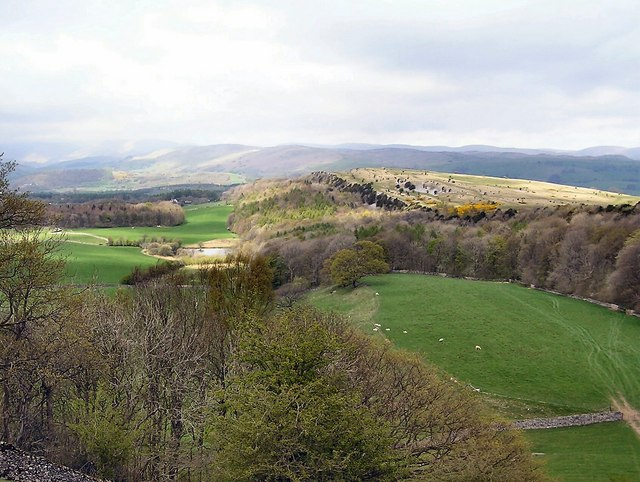

Highest point
- Elevation: 207 m (679 ft)
- Prominence: c. 39 m
- Listing: Outlying Wainwright
- Coordinates: 54°19′25″N 2°47′14″W

Geography
- Location within the Lake District
- Location: Cumbria, England
- Parent range: Lake District
- OS grid: SD489923
- Topo map: OS Landranger 97

Cunswick Scar is a limestone scar (cliff or steep rock face) in the Lake District, England. There are extensive views from the large cairn at the top (207 metres (679 ft)). The scar is listed in the Scout Scar chapter of Wainwright's The Outlying Fells of Lakeland.

Fossils can be found in the limestone on the scar and Cunswick Fell. The area is also of interest for its flora and fauna: Scout Scar and Cunswick Scar have been designated a Site of Special Scientific Interest.
