= Helleborine =

Helleborine is the common name for a number of species of orchid. It does not correspond to any currently used taxonomic category. Some of the plants called helleborines are classified in the genus Epipactis, some in genus Cephalanthera. A genus Helleborine was formerly recognised but has now been absorbed into the Grass pink genus Calopogon.
