= Witherslack Mosses =

Wetland in Cumbria, England

- IUCN category V (protected landscape/seascape)
- Location within England
- Location: Cumbria, England
- Coordinates: 54°14′10″N 2°50′22″W
- Area: 486 ha (1,200 acres)

Witherslack Mosses are a fragmented wetland west of the Kent estuary in Cumbria, England, within the Lake District National Park. They consist of three raised bogs, the remnants of a formerly extensive, estuarine bog, which have been protected under the Habitats Directive as a Special Area of Conservation.

- Foulshaw Moss, with an area of 350 ha, the largest of the three.
- Meathop Moss, 82 ha,
- Nichols Moss, 12.5 ha

The site was designated an SAC in 2005. The bogs were already individually protected as nature reserves in the care of Cumbria Wildlife Trust and, under UK legislation, as Sites of Special Scientific Interest.

== Restoration ==
All three bogs have retained some of the original dome structure, characteristic of raised bogs. However, each has been degraded by drainage and by peat-cutting around the edges. Restoration work has been carried out since the late 20th century. This has reversed afforestation and associated drainage work.

In 2022 land adjacent to Nicholls Moss was bought in order to extend the reserve.

== Public access ==
Parking for Foulshaw Moss is just off the A590 (westbound).

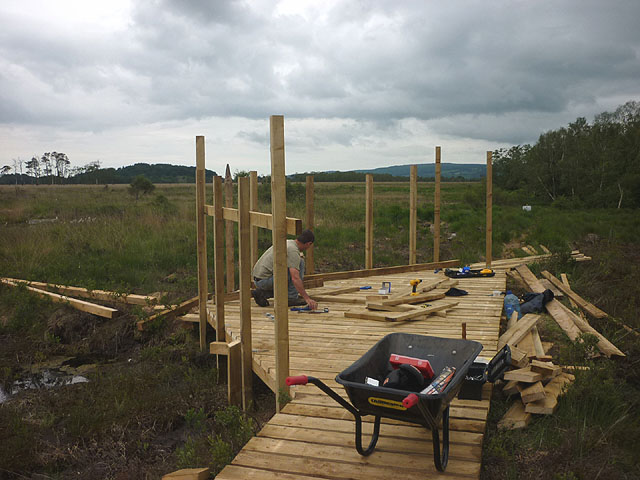
Work to improve access to Foulshaw Moss

Raised water levels, as a result of bog restoration work, adversely affected public access to Meathop Moss and Foulshaw Moss around 2012, and the boardwalks had to be relaid.

== Fauna ==
The mosses are known for their invertebrates. The restoration of the wetland has seen species returning, notably:

- White-faced Darters (reintroduced from 2010).
- Ospreys (nested successfully at Foulshaw Moss in 2014).
