= Listed buildings in Meathop and Ulpha =

Meathop and Ulpha is a former civil parish, now in the parish of Witherslack, Meathop and Ulpha, in the Westmorland and Furness district of Cumbria, England. It contained four listed buildings that are recorded in the National Heritage List for England. All the listed buildings are designated at Grade II, the lowest of the three grades, which is applied to "buildings of national importance and special interest". Much of the parish was salt marsh, and the listed buildings consisted of three bridges and a house.

== Buildings ==
Name and location	Photograph	Date	Notes
Meathop Hall and cottage 54.21972°N 2.86320°W		Late 17th century	Originally one house, later divided into a house and a cottage, it is in stone with slate roofs. There are two storeys with attics, four bays, lower two-storey two-bay extensions on each side, and at the rear is an outshut and a small gabled wing. In the attic are three gabled dormers each with three lights, the middle light higher. The gables have decorative bargeboards. In the upper floor the windows are mullioned and in the ground floor they are mullioned and transomed. The doorway has an embattled lintel. Both extensions have gabled porches, the windows in the left extension are fixed with opening lights, and in the right extension they are casements.
Wilson House Bridge; 54.22059°N 2.88243°W	—	Late 18th or early 19th century	The bridge carries a road over River Winster. It is in stone, and consists of a single segmental arch with a keystone, a band, and a coped parapet.
Bridge near Cragg Cottage; 54.22034°N 2.83213°W	—	Early 19th century	The bridge carries a path over a former drainage ditch, now silted up. It is in stone, and consists of three segmental arches. The arches have cutwaters with slots for sluices. Above the arches are a straight band and parapets.
Bridge over drainage ditch 54.22271°N 2.84551°W		Early 19th century	The bridge carries a road over a drainage ditch. It is in stone and consists of a single elliptical arch, above which are three bands, and plain parapets.
