= Oversands School =

Special school in Cumbria, England

Location
- Witherslack; Grange-over-Sands, Cumbria, LA11 6SD; England; 54.26814°N 2.86667°W

Information
- Type: Private special school
- Established: 1973
- Specialist: SEN
- Department for Education URN: 112452 Tables
- Ofsted: Reports
- Gender: Coeducational
- Age: 8 to 19
- Enrolment: 67
- Website: https://witherslackgroup.co.uk/oversands-school/

Oversands School (formerly Witherslack Hall School) is a private special school with specialist SEN status situated in the village of Witherslack near Grange-over-Sands, Cumbria, England.

It was opened in 1973 as a residential and day school for boys aged 11–19 with special educational needs, including complex learning, communication, behavioural, emotional and social difficulties.

The school has now been renamed to Oversands School and is a coeducational school for pupils aged 8 to 19.

The School is now run by Witherslack Group Ltd, a group which provides care and education for children with SEN needs, alongside children's homes.

== Witherslack Hall ==
The school's central building, Witherslack Hall, was built in 1874 by Lancaster architects Paley and Austin and is recorded in the National Heritage List for England as a designated Grade II listed building. It gave its name to a steam locomotive in the GWR Modified Hall Class, 6990 Witherslack Hall.

== See also ==
- Listed buildings in Witherslack
- List of non-ecclesiastical works by Paley and Austin
