= Meathop =

Village in Cumbria, England

Coordinates: 54.220°N 2.863°W

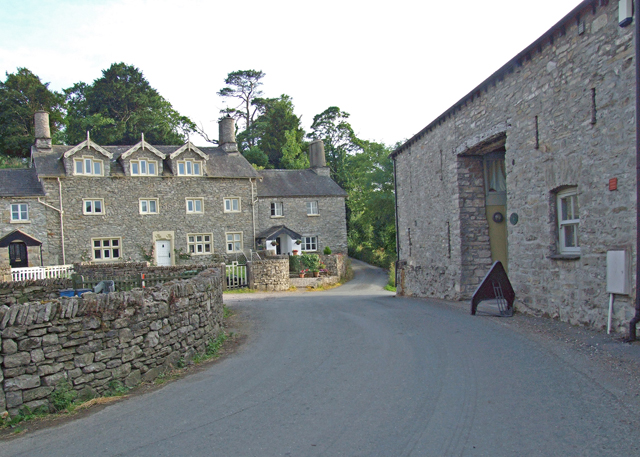
- Meathop

- Location in South Lakeland Location within Cumbria
- OS grid reference: SD4380
- Civil parish: Witherslack, Meathop and Ulpha
- Unitary authority: Westmorland and Furness
- Ceremonial county: Cumbria
- Region: North West
- Country: England
- Sovereign state: United Kingdom
- Post town: GRANGE OVER SANDS
- Postcode district: LA11
- Dialling code: 015395
- Police: Cumbria
- Fire: Cumbria
- Ambulance: North West
- UK Parliament: Westmorland and Lonsdale

Meathop is a village in the non-metropolitan county of Westmorland and Furness and the ceremonial county of Cumbria, England. Historically in Westmorland, it is located 3.6 miles (5.8 km) north east of Grange over Sands, between the confluence of the River Kent estuary and the River Winster on the edge of Morecambe Bay.

The most prominent building is Meathop Hall, a Grade II listed 17th century house which has since been divided into two. It consists of two floors with dormers, and has round Westmorland chimneys and an ornamented embattled or 'Yorkshire' lintel over the front door.

Westmorland Sanatorium, later known as Meathop Hospital, was a sanatorium for patients with tuberculosis. It opened in 1891 and closed in 1991 when it was converted into apartments and renamed as Meathop Grange.

== See also ==
- Listed buildings in Meathop and Ulpha
