= Witherslack =

Village in Cumbria, England

Coordinates: 54.245°N 2.859°W

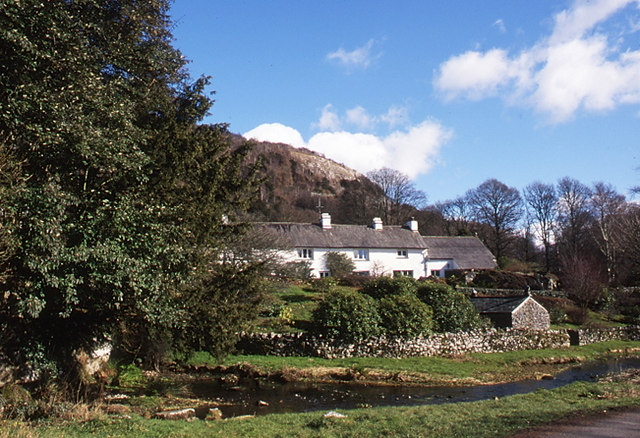
- Cottages at Beck Head

- Location in South Lakeland Location within Cumbria
- Population: 499 (2011)
- OS grid reference: SD4483
- Civil parish: Witherslack, Meathop and Ulpha
- Unitary authority: Westmorland and Furness
- Ceremonial county: Cumbria
- Region: North West
- Country: England
- Sovereign state: United Kingdom
- Post town: GRANGE OVER SANDS
- Postcode district: LA11
- Dialling code: 015395
- Police: Cumbria
- Fire: Cumbria
- Ambulance: North West
- UK Parliament: Westmorland and Lonsdale

Witherslack is a small village and former civil parish, now in the parish of Witherslack, Meathop and Ulpha, in the Westmorland and Furness district, in the south of Cumbria, England. It lies on the north eastern side of Morecambe Bay, England. The eastern side of the village borders Whitbarrow Scar with Yewbarrow, which is a small limestone hill, located in the centre of the village.

In the 2001 census the former parish had a population of 482, increasing at the 2011 census to 499.

Witherslack is quite scattered with four distinct areas. Townend, Mill Side, Beck Head and the school/church. Townend is traditionally considered the centre of the village and contains the local pub, The Derby Arms, and the Community Shop. Mill Side is the location of the old Mill and still contains the mill pond. Beck Head lies to the north of Mill Side and is where a small river emerges from the limestone escarpment adjacent to Whitbarrow. The area of the village with the Dean Barwick School and St. Paul's church lies to the west of Yewbarrow.

== Amenities ==
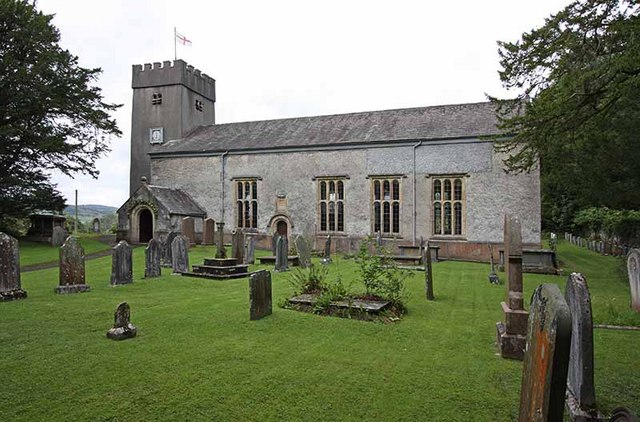
St Paul's Church

St Paul's Church is the only place of worship in the village.

The refurbished Derby Arms has several real ales and a selection of food.

Witherslack also has a community shop with the usual provisions and local produce.

== Schools ==
There are two schools in Witherslack;

- Dean Barwick Primary School which is a forest school that uses the natural area surrounding it to educate.
- Oversands School which provides education for children with behavioural and associated learning difficulties.

== Geography ==
Witherslack sits on slate with carboniferous limestone forming the outcrops of Whitbarrow and Yewbarrow. The village gives its name to nearby wetland, Witherslack Mosses.

== Landmarks ==
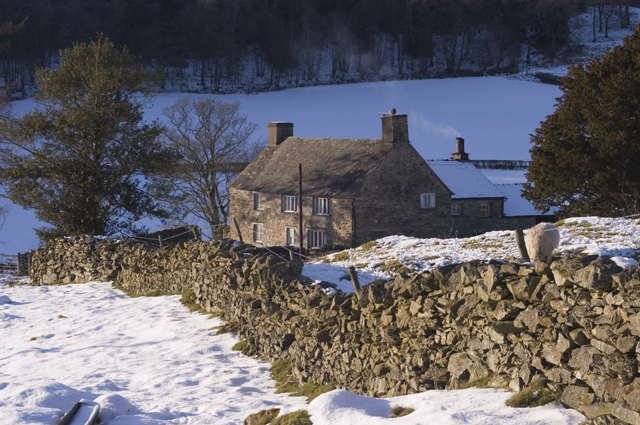
Nether Hall

East of the church and north of Townend lies Nether Hall, which was the 15th-century home of the Harrington family. The present 16th- and 17th-century building incorporates walls 5 feet thick, which are probably the remains of a pele tower.

== History ==
Witherslack was formerly a township and chapelry in Beetham parish, from 1866 Witherslack was a civil parish in its own right until it was abolished on 1 April 2015 and merged with Meathop and Ulpha to form "Witherslack, Meathop and Ulpha".

== See also ==
- Listed buildings in Witherslack
