= Windermere Motor Boat Racing Club =

British boating club

Coordinates: 54.331785°N 2.934640°W

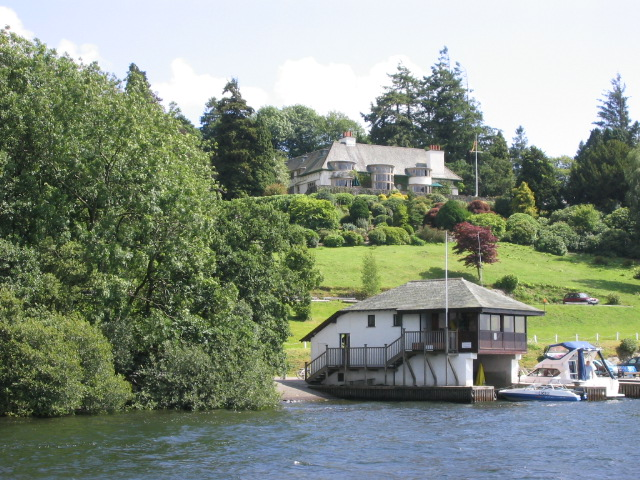
Broad Leys house, today headquarters of the WMBRC

The Windermere Motor Boat Racing Club is a British boating club based at Bowness-on-Windermere, Cumbria. The Club was founded in 1925 and is the oldest motor boat racing club in the world. Its present headquarters, Broad Leys, was acquired in 1950. It is an architecturally significant building.

For many years, power-boating and water-skiing were popular activities on the lake. With the introduction of a 10 miles per hour (16 km/h) speed limit on Windermere in 2005, the motorboat racing programme moved to Barrow Docks until in 2012 the Club successfully applied for an exemption to race on the lake again for a limited number of days.

Windermere Motor Boat Racing Club today combines this tradition of club racing on the lake with a broad calendar of motor-boat, sailing and off-the-water activities. The Club is also the lead organising body for the annual Record Week held on nearby Coniston Water.

As custodians of Broad Leys, the Club and its members also pursue various initiatives in the ongoing care and preservation of the house and its heritage.

== See also ==
- Windermere Cruising Association
