= Crook, Cumbria =

Village and civil parish in Cumbria, England

Coordinates: 54.348°N 2.828°W

Crook
- Village and parish
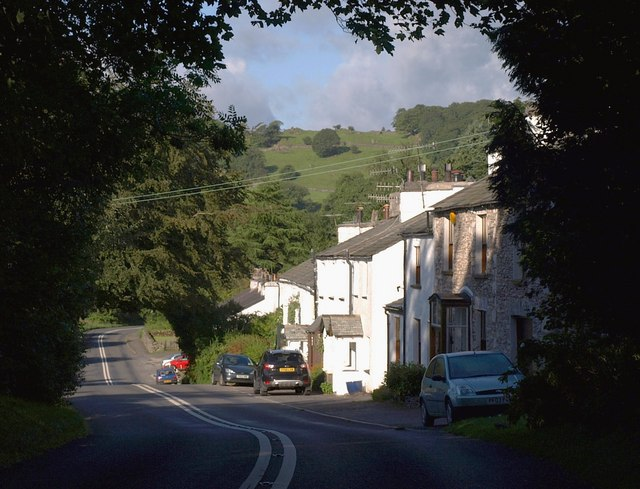
- Crook

- Location in the former South Lakeland district Location within Cumbria
- Population: 350 (2021)
- OS grid reference: SD4695
- Civil parish: Crook
- Unitary authority: Westmorland and Furness
- Ceremonial county: Cumbria
- Region: North West
- Country: England
- Sovereign state: United Kingdom
- Post town: KENDAL
- Postcode district: LA8
- Dialling code: 01539; 015395; 015394
- Police: Cumbria
- Fire: Cumbria
- Ambulance: North West
- UK Parliament: Westmorland and Lonsdale

Crook is a village and civil parish in Cumbria, England, on the B5284 road between Kendal and Windermere. In the 2001 census the parish had a population of 340, increasing at the 2011 census to 364, and decreasing at the 2021 census to 350. The earliest known mention of Crook was circa 1170-1184.

== Toponymy ==
The exact reason for the village being called 'Crook' is unknown. However, it could come from the Old Norse word 'krókr' or the Old English word 'crōc' which both mean: a crook, a bend; usually denoting land in the bend of a river, but sometimes a nook, a secluded corner of land. The name could be referencing the secluded location of the Church and Hall. It is speculated that the neighbouring town's name, Windermere, also derives from Old English.

The spelling of 'Crook' has not been consistent throughout the years and has been spelt in a variety of ways: Crok(e), Crook(e), Cruke, and Croyke.

== Notable Buildings ==
The original St. Catherine's church was built circa 1516 and served as the main church for the parish. A tower was constructed in 1620 and is all that remains of the old church to this day The tower was refurbished in 1993 using funds from grants and donations. The main body of the church was purposely demolished in 1887 due to structural defects. The new St. Catherine's church was built in 1882 by Stephen Shaw, a local architect, in a plain late Perpendicular style and still operates today.

Crook Memorial Hall was built in 1926/7 and commemorates the local soldiers who died during World War 1 and World War 2. It also serves as a public venue for local functions.

Until 1984, the village had a school for local children. The original school was built in 1795, rebuilt in 1852, and remained in use until its replacement by a new school in 1873. The new school was located in the centre of the township and served as the main schoolhouse for the parish until its closure in 1984. A replacement was never built, possibly due to a lack of demand.

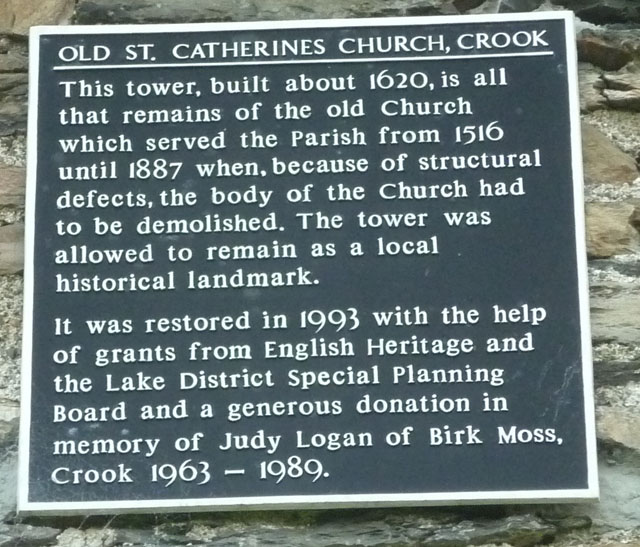
Plaque on the tower of old St Catherine's Church. It describes the history and refurbishment of the tower.

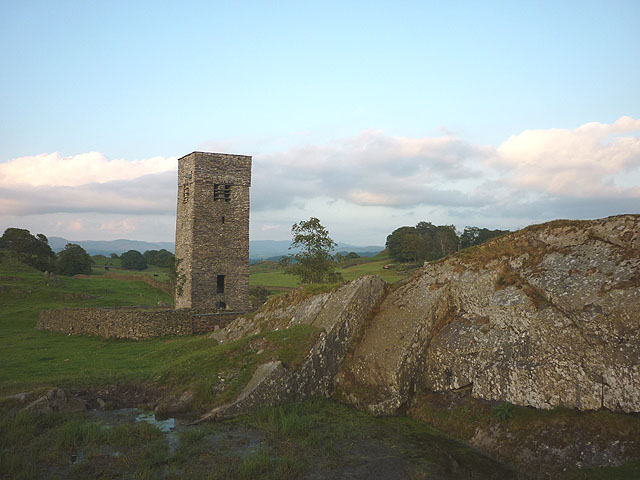
The tower of old St. Catherine's church, refurbished in 1993.

A mile to the north of the village, Hollin Hall is a Grade II listed building.

== History ==
Crook has been a minor village for most of its history, with its population never rising above 400. Surrounded by hills, most of its economy consisted of agriculture that focused on local sheep, such as herdwicks, and the manufacturing of woollen products, such as woollen worsteds. In the 19th century, there was a focus on bobbin production with two bobbin mills: Crook Mill and Birks Mill, with the latter having industrial machines.

== See also ==
- Listed buildings in Crook, Cumbria
