= Hutton Roof Crags =

Hill in Cumbria, England

Coordinates: 54.19133°N 2.68196°W

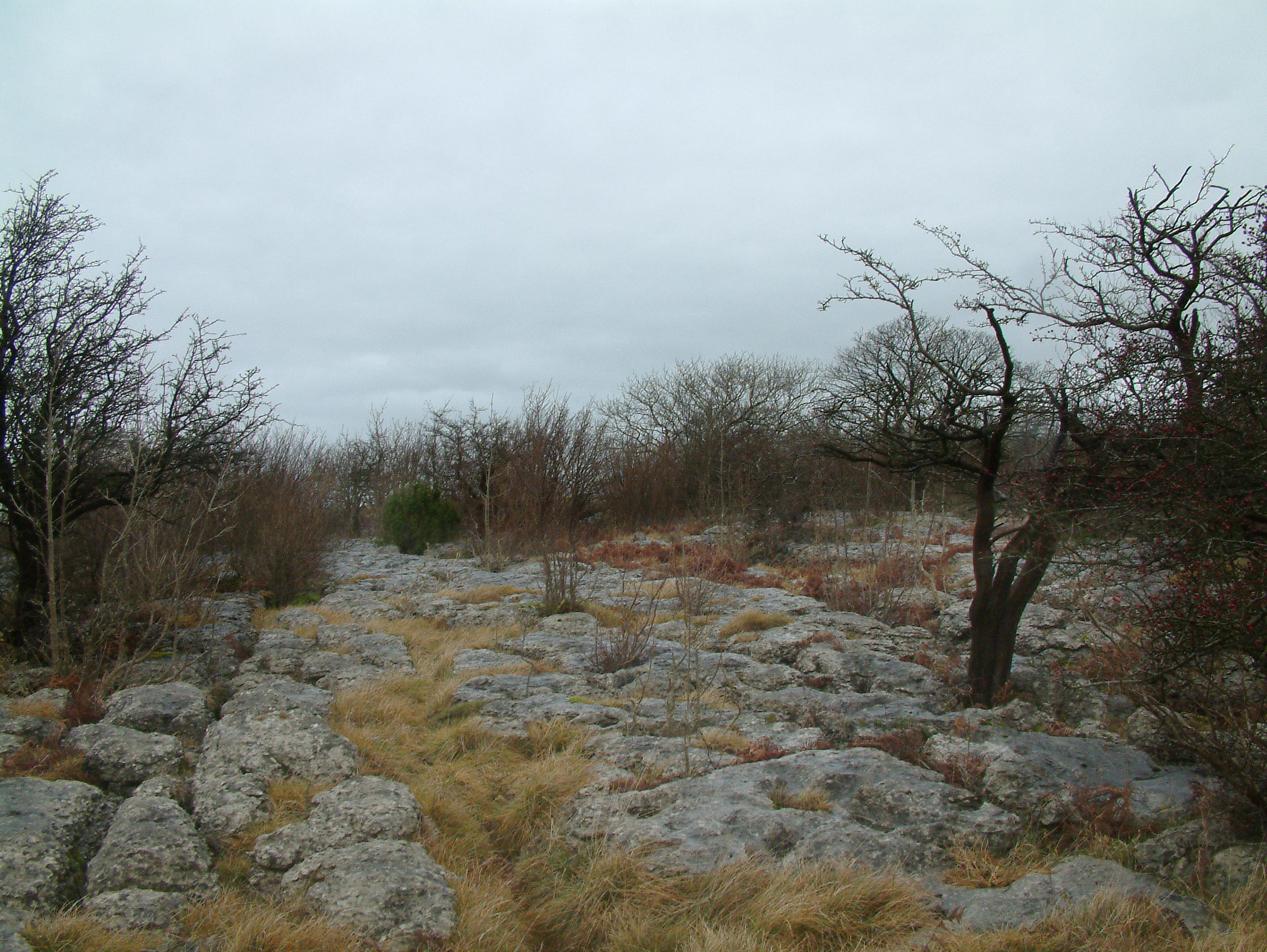
- Limestone pavement on the top of Hutton Roof Crags

Highest point
- Elevation: 274 m (899 ft)
- Prominence: c. 176 m (577 ft)
- Parent peak: Grayrigg Forest
- Listing: Marilyn

Geography
- Location: Cumbria, England
- OS grid: SD556775
- Topo map: OS Landranger 97

Hutton Roof Crags is a hill in southeastern Cumbria in northwest England, located near to the village of Hutton Roof. It has extensive areas of limestone pavement as well as grassland and woodland. The hill forms the Hutton Roof Crags Site of Special Scientific Interest and is part of the Morecambe Bay Pavements Special Area of Conservation. A significant proportion of the UK's 20 km^{2} (7.7 sq mi) of limestone pavement is to be found on Hutton Roof Crags and the neighbouring Farleton Knott.

Although part of the hill is pasture grazed by sheep and part is forested, much remains open common land, and it is here that most of the limestone pavement is to be found. However, much has been removed over the years for many purposes including building, agricultural fertiliser, and production of millstones, but is now protected by law and it is an offence to remove any. The limestone is over 300 m (980 ft) thick, and was laid down during the Carboniferous period some 350 million years ago. The limestone pavements here occupy an intermediate position between the low-lying pavements of Gait Barrows some 8 km (5.0 mi) to the west, and those on Ingleborough, 19 km (12 mi) to the east.

Hutton Roof National Nature Reserve is managed by Cumbria Wildlife Trust, which leases Park Wood and Hutton Roof Common from Natural England and Hutton Roof Parish Council respectively.

Plants including angular Solomon's seal (Polygonatum odoratum), limestone fern (Gymnocarpium robertianum), and dark red helleborine (Epipactis atrorubens) are to be found on the pavement. The nationally scarce rigid buckler-fern (Dryopteris submontana) is abundant on Hutton Roof Crags. Blue moor-grass (Sesleria caerulea) is also nationally scarce but abundant here.

The name Hutton Roof Crags is believed to derive from the Old English language, and means 'crags on hill near farmstead of Rolf'.

Access is possible via the public footpath running across the north of the fell, but is probably easier through the woods to the south-west.

The extensive low limestone outcrops make the Hutton Roof Crags a popular site for bouldering.
