= River Winster =

River in Cumbria, England

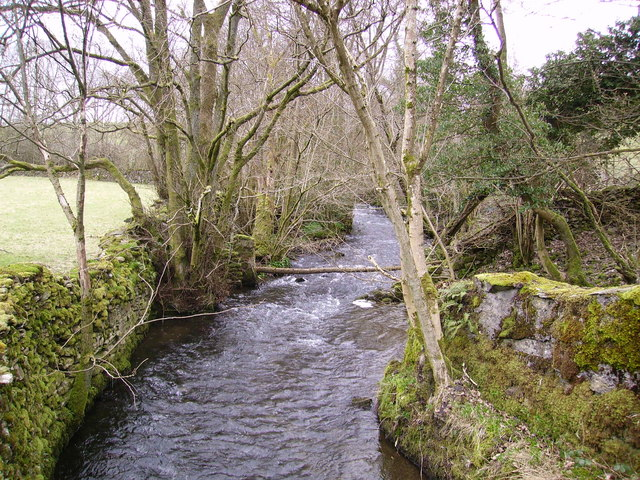
The river from the road to Hartbarrow

The River Winster is a river in the English county of Cumbria. The Winster was the boundary between the historic counties of Lancashire and Westmorland. It has a relatively small catchment area; other streams flow parallel to it on either side.

The Winster is about 20 km or 12 miles long, and rises about 2 km south of Bowness-on-Windermere, between the hamlets of Winster and Storrs (the latter is on Windermere) and follows a southerly course, flowing past the settlements of Ludderburn, Hartbarrow and Bowland Bridge, before it is joined by Arndale Beck at Bridge House.

From there, the river continues through a valley between Whitbarrow and Cartmel Fell, flowing through Helton Tarn. It continues between the villages of Lindale and Meathop, and finally flows into the Kent estuary just downstream from Arnside.

A former course of the river joined the Kent at Blawith Point, and as a result the peninsula of Holme Island often changed hands between Lancashire and Westmorland.

== Packhorse Bridges ==
A packhorse bridge is a bridge intended to carry packhorses (horses loaded with sidebags or panniers) across a river or stream.

There are two packhorse bridges on this river near Winster. The Winster Bridge (1729 with 20th-century parapet) on the river at 54.3269°N 2.9021°W Another packhorse bridge (Probably 17th-century. Grade II listed) is on a tributary of the River Winster at 54.3408°N 2.9051°W, adjacent to A5074 road.
