= Cumbria Wildlife Trust =

Wildlife trust covering Cumbria, England

Cumbria Wildlife Trust is a wildlife trust covering the county of Cumbria, in North West England. It runs more than 40 nature reserves, and aims to broaden the awareness and knowledge of the wildlife in the county.

== History ==
The trust was established in 1962 as the Lake District Naturalists' Trust. It changed its name to the Cumbria Trust for Nature Conservation in 1974, when the county of Cumbria was created.

Its headquarters are near Kendal, at the edge of the Lake District National Park. Most of the reserves, which include peat bogs (Witherslack Mosses), limestone pavements (Hutton Roof Crags), ancient woodlands and coastal sites (South Walney), are outside the national park. Recent acquisitions include Craggy Wood at Staveley.

== Activities ==
The trust runs educational programmes for visitors, suitable for all ages, and welcomes the involvement of volunteers. It also campaigns regionally and nationally on a range of wildlife issues.

In recent years it has been involved with hay meadows (via the Coronation Meadows project and the trust's own Meadow Life project) and the designation of Marine Conservation Zones in the Irish Sea.

In 2024, the trust purchased 1,200 hectares (3,000 acres) of Skiddaw Forest with the aim of creating England's highest nature reserve. The project will see the re-introduction of hen harriers, black grouse, water voles, aspen and rare upland bumblebees, as well as the planting 300,000 native trees The purchase was partly funded by a £5m grant from Aviva, with a public appeal being launched to raise the balance.
