= List of national nature reserves in England =

This is a list of current national nature reserves in England. Sites formerly notified, such as Braunton Burrows in Devon, are not included.

== Avon ==
- Gordano Valley
- Leigh Woods

== Bedfordshire ==
- Barton Hills
- King's Wood, Heath & Reach
- Knocking Hoe

== Berkshire ==
- Chobham Common

== Buckinghamshire ==
- Burnham Beeches

== Cambridgeshire ==
- Barnack Hills & Holes
- Bedford Purlieus
- Castor Hanglands
- Chippenham Fen
- Holme Fen
- Monks Wood
- Upwood Meadows
- Wicken Fen
- Woodwalton Fen

== Cheshire ==
- Rostherne Mere
- Wybunbury Moss

== Cleveland ==
- Teesmouth

== Cornwall ==
- Golitha Falls
- Goss Moor
- The Lizard

== Cumbria ==
- Bassenthwaite Lake
- Blelham Bog
- Clawthorpe Fell
- Cliburn Moss
- Drumburgh Moss
- Duddon Mosses
- Finglandrigg Woods
- Gowk Bank
- Great Asby Scar
- Hallsenna Moor
- High Leys
- Moor House-Upper Teesdale
- North Fen
- North Walney
- Park Wood
- Roudsea Wood & Mosses
- Rusland Moss
- Sandscale Haws
- Sandybeck Meadow
- Smardale Gill
- South Solway Mosses
- Tarn Moss
- Thornhill Moss and Meadows
- Walton Moss
- Whitbarrow

== Derbyshire ==
- Calke Park
- Derbyshire Dales
- Dovedail
- Kinder Scout

== Devon ==
- Axmouth to Lyme Regis Undercliffs
- Berry Head - Sharkham Point
- Black-a-Tor Copse
- Dawlish Warren
- Dendles Wood
- Dunsdon Farm
- East Dartmoor Woods and Heaths
- Slapton Ley
- Wistman's Wood

== Dorset ==
- Arne Reedbeds
- Durlston
- Hambledon Hill
- Hartland Moor
- Hog Cliff
- Holt Heath
- Holton Heath
- Horn Park Quarry
- Lyscombe
- Morden Bog
- Stoborough Heath
- Studland and Godlingston Heath
- Valley of Stones

== Durham ==
- Cassop Vale
- Castle Eden Dene
- Derwent Gorge & Muggleswick Woods
- Durham Coast
- Moor House-Upper Teesdale
- Thrislington

== East Riding of Yorkshire ==
- Lower Derwent Valley
- Spurn

== East Sussex ==
- Castle Hill
- Lewes Downs (Mount Caburn)
- Lullington Heath
- Pevensey Levels

== Essex ==
- Blackwater Estuary
- Colne Estuary
- Dengie
- Hales Wood
- Hamford Water
- Hatfield Forest
- Leigh

== Gloucestershire ==
- Cotswold Commons & Beechwoods
- Highbury Wood
- Lady Park Wood
- The Hudnalls

== Greater Manchester ==
- Risley, Holcroft and Chat Moss National Nature Reserve

== Hampshire ==
- Ashford Hangers
- Ashford Hill
- Beacon Hill
- Butser Hill
- Castle Bottom NNR
- Kingston Great Common
- Martin Down
- North Solent
- Old Winchester Hill
- Titchfield Haven

== Herefordshire ==
- Downton Gorge
- Moccas Park
- The Flits

== Hertfordshire ==
- Broxbourne Woods

== Isle of Wight ==
- Newtown

== Kent ==
- East Blean Woods and Church Woods, Blean
- Dungeness
- Elmley
- Ham Street Woods
- High Halstow
- Lydden Temple Ewell
- Sandwich and Pegwell Bay
- Stodmarsh
- Swanscombe Skull Site
- The Swale
- Wye

== Lancashire ==
- Gait Barrows
- Ribble Estuary

== Leicestershire ==
- Bradgate Park
- Charnwood Lodge
- Cribb's Meadow
- Muston Meadows

== Lincolnshire ==
- Bardney Limewoods
- Far Ings
- Gibraltar Point
- The Wash
- Lincolnshire Coronation Coast
  - Saltfleetby-Theddlethorpe Dunes
  - Donna Nook

== London ==
- Richmond Park
- Ruislip Woods
- South London Downs

== Merseyside ==
- Ainsdale Sand Dunes
- Cabin Hill
- Ribble Estuary

== Norfolk ==
- Ant Broads and Marshes
- Blakeney Point
- Brettenham Heath
- Bure Marshes
- Calthorpe Broad
- Dersingham Bog
- Foxley Wood
- Heigham Holmes
- Hickling Broad
- Holkham
- Holme Dunes
- Ludham - Potter Heigham Marshes
- Martham Broad
- Mid-Yare
- Redgrave and Lopham Fen
- Roydon Common
- Scolt Head Island
- Swanton Novers
- The Wash
- Weeting Heath
- Winterton Dunes

== North Yorkshire ==
- Acaster South Ings
- Duncombe Park
- Forge Valley Woods
- Ingleborough
- Ling Gill
- Malham Tarn
- New House Farm, Malham
- Scoska Wood
- Skipwith Common

== Northamptonshire ==
- Buckingham Thick Copse
- Collyweston Great Wood & Easton Hornstocks

== Northumberland ==
- Derwent Gorge & Muggleswick Woods
- Farne Islands
- Greenlee Lough
- Kielder Mires
- Kielderhead
- Lindisfarne
- Muckle Moss
- Newham Bog
- Whitelee Moor

== Nottinghamshire ==
- Sherwood Forest

== Oxfordshire ==
- Aston Rowant
- Chimney Meadow
- Cothill
- Wychwood

== Shropshire ==
- Fenn's, Whixall and Bettisfield Mosses
- Stiperstones
- Wem Moss

== Somerset ==
- Barrington Hill Meadows
- Bridgwater Bay
- Dunkery & Horner Woods
- Ebbor Gorge
- Ham Wall
- Hardington Moor
- Hawkcombe Woods
- Huntspill River
- Rodney Stoke SSSI
- Shapwick Heath
- Somerset Levels
- Tarr Steps Woodland
- Westhay Moor

== South Yorkshire ==
- Humberhead Peatlands

== Staffordshire ==
- Aqualate Mere
- Chartley Moss
- Hulme Quarry
- Mottey Meadows

== Suffolk ==
- Benacre NNR
- Bradfield Woods
- Cavenham Heath
- Orfordness-Havergate
- Redgrave and Lopham Fen
- Suffolk Coast NNR
- Thetford Heath
- Westleton Heath

== Surrey ==
- Ashtead Common
- Chobham Common
- Thursley

== West Midlands ==
- Sutton Park
- Wren's Nest

== West Sussex ==
- Ebernoe Common
- Kingley Vale

== West Yorkshire ==
- Bradford Pennine Gateway

== Wiltshire ==
- Fyfield Down
- Langley Wood
- North Meadow, Cricklade
- Parsonage Down
- Pewsey Downs
- Prescombe Down
- Wylye Down

== Worcestershire ==
- Bredon Hill
- Chaddesley Woods
- Foster's Green Meadows
- Wyre Forest

== See also ==
- National nature reserve (United Kingdom)
- National nature reserves in Scotland
- National nature reserves in Wales
- National nature reserves in the Isle of Man
- Nature reserves in Northern Ireland
