= National nature reserves in England =

Protected area designation in England

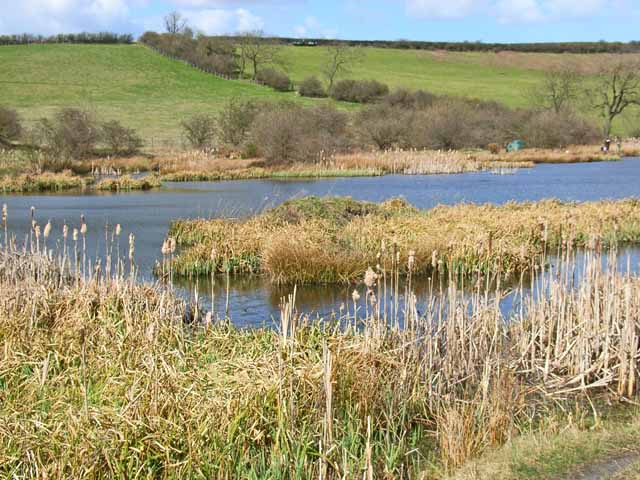
Cassop Vale National Nature Reserve

In England, national nature reserves (NNRs) are designated by Natural England as key places for wildlife and natural features. They were established to protect the most significant areas of habitat and of geological formations. NNRs are managed on behalf of the nation, many by Natural England itself, but also by non-governmental organisations, including the members of The Wildlife Trusts partnership, the National Trust, and the Royal Society for the Protection of Birds.

There are 224 NNRs in England covering 1,100 square kilometres (420 square miles). Often they contain rare or nationally important populations of species, such as birds, plants, insects, reptiles and mammals.

== Spotlight NNRs ==
Natural England has selected 35 as spotlight reserves:

1. Ainsdale Sand Dunes NNR, Merseyside
2. Aston Rowant NNR, Oxfordshire
3. Barnack Hills & Holes NNR, Cambridgeshire
4. Castle Eden Dene, County Durham
5. Derbyshire Dales NNR, Derbyshire
6. Duncombe Park NNR, North Yorkshire
7. Durham Coast, County Durham
8. East Dartmoor Woods and Heaths NNR, Devon
9. Farne Islands NNR, Northumberland
10. Fenn's, Whixall and Bettisfield Mosses NNR, Shropshire/Wales
11. Finglandrigg Woods NNR, Cumbria
12. Gait Barrows NNR, Lancashire
13. Gibraltar Point NNR, Lincolnshire
14. Golitha Falls NNR, Cornwall
15. Holkham NNR, Norfolk
16. Ingleborough NNR, North Yorkshire
17. Kingley Vale NNR, West Sussex
18. Lindisfarne, Northumberland
19. Lower Derwent Valley NNR, East Riding of Yorkshire
20. Moor House-Upper Teesdale, Cumbria & County Durham
21. North Meadow, Cricklade NNR, Wiltshire
22. Old Winchester Hill NNR, Hampshire
23. Redgrave and Lopham Fen, Norfolk & Suffolk
24. Saltfleetby-Theddlethorpe Dunes NNR, Lincolnshire
25. Shapwick Heath NNR, Somerset
26. Slapton Ley NNR, Devon
27. Stiperstones NNR, Shropshire
28. Stodmarsh NNR, Kent
29. Studland and Godlingston Heath NNR, Dorset
30. Teesmouth NNR, Teesside
31. The Lizard NNR, Cornwall
32. Suffolk Coast NNR, Suffolk
33. Thursley NNR, Surrey
34. Wicken Fen, Cambridgeshire
35. Wye NNR, Kent

For a full list of English NNRs, see List of national nature reserves in England

== See also ==
- Nature reserve
- National nature reserve (United Kingdom)
- Nature reserves in Northern Ireland
- National nature reserve (Scotland)
- National nature reserves in Wales
