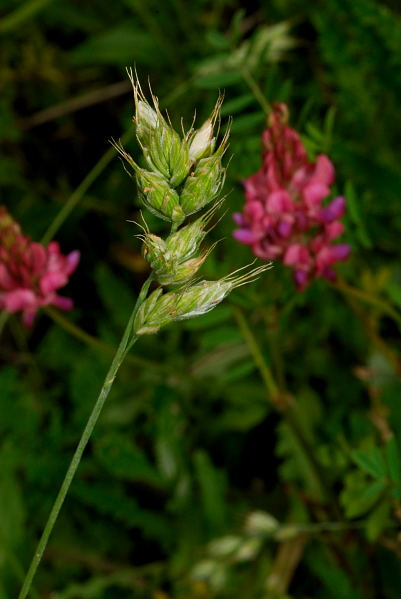
- Bromus interruptus flowering spike with sainfoin flowering in the background

Conservation status
- Extinct in the Wild (IUCN 3.1)

Scientific classification
- Kingdom: Plantae
- Clade: Embryophytes
- Clade: Tracheophytes
- Clade: Spermatophytes
- Clade: Angiosperms
- Clade: Monocots
- Clade: Commelinids
- Order: Poales
- Family: Poaceae
- Subfamily: Pooideae
- Genus: Bromus
- Species: B. interruptus

Binomial name
- Bromus interruptus (Hack.) Druce

Synonyms
- Bromus mollis var. interruptus Hack.

= Bromus interruptus =

Interrupted brome

Species of flowering plant

Bromus interruptus, commonly known as the interrupted brome, is a flowering plant in the grass family. It was endemic to southern and central England, but it went extinct in the wild in 1972. After several decades in cultivation, the interrupted brome was re-introduced to Aston Rowant National Nature Reserve in 2004, marking the first known re-introduction of an extinct plant in Britain. The plant was a weed of waste places and arable agriculture, particularly of sainfoin (Onobrychis viciifolia) cultivation. It can be distinguished from all other Bromus species by its deeply split, or bifid, palea.

The plant appeared to spread rapidly after its discovery in 1849, which is normally indicative of introduced species. However, the species is thought to have arisen in the 19th century as a new species through a substantial and abrupt genetic change. It is thought to have gone into decline with the replacement of horses by motor vehicles from the late 19th century onwards, reducing the demand for sainfoin as fodder, and additionally by improved seed cleaning methods.

== Description ==
Bromus interruptus is an annual or biennial herb. Its slender to somewhat stout culms measure 20 to 100 cm (7.9 to 39 in) and occur as either loosely tufted or solitary. They are erect, very lightly pubescent, unbranched and contain 2 to 4 nodes. The green leaves measure 6 to 20 cm (2.4 to 7.9 in) long by 2 to 6 mm wide and are long-linear in shape with a pointed apex. They are covered in a soft pubescence. The leaf sheaths are tubular with the lower portion having a soft pubescence replaced by shorter hairs in the upper portion. The ligules measure 1 to 2 mm and are membranous and toothed.

The inflorescence is a dense, oblong panicle that measures 2 to 9 cm (0.8 to 3.5 in) in length and up to 20 mm thick. It is erect, greyish green in colour and, as the name suggests, usually interrupted, sometimes even reduced to a single spikelet. Its branches measure up to 15 mm in length. The sessile (i.e. without a stalk) or nearly sessile spikelets occur in dense clusters with each measuring 10 to 15 mm long by 5 to 8 mm broad. They are covered in soft pubescence and are plump with a broadly ovate (i.e. egg-shaped) to broadly oblong shape. Each contains 5 to 11 flowers and they slowly break up beneath each lemma once mature.

The glumes, or sterile husks at the base of each spikelet, are unequal in morphology and persist after maturity. Both the upper and lower glumes may have apices ranging from blunt to abruptly pointed. The lower glume is 5 to 7 mm long with 3 to 7 veins and an oblong to elliptical outline. The upper one is slightly larger, measuring 6 to 9 mm long with 5 to 9 veins and an ovate to broadly elliptical shape.

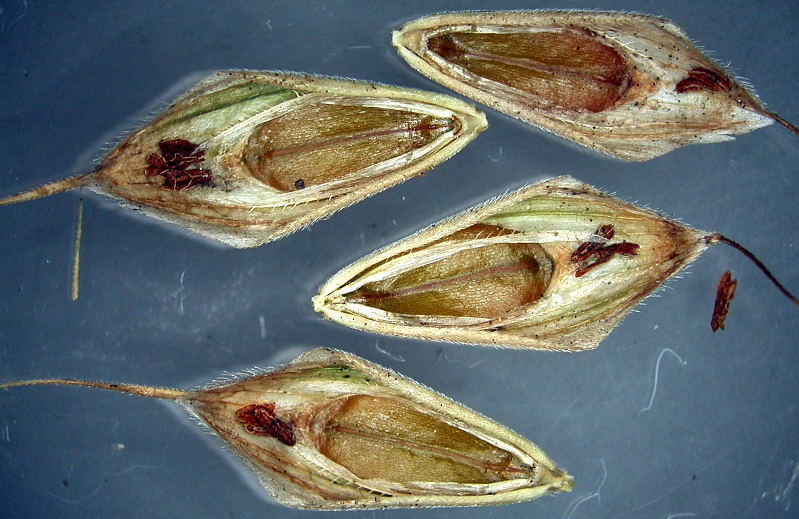
Bromus interruptus flowers, separated from a seed head or spikelet, each showing a ripe seed (caryopsis) and a deeply split palea

The lemmas, the outer of the two husks enclosing a flower, measure 7.5 to 9 mm long by 5 to 5.5 mm wide and have an obovate to obovate-elliptic outline. They have 7 to 9 prominent veins, 2 very small teeth, and membranous margins that are more flexible than the otherwise firm centre. Each lemma has a fine, rough awn that measures 4 to 8 mm and may be either straight or bending. The paleas, the upper of the two husks that enclose a flower, are narrowly elliptical in outline and are shorter than the lemmas. They are bifid (i.e. split in two) to the base with the split keel being somewhat pubescent. The bifid paleas distinguish the interrupted brome from all other species in the genus. Each spikelet contains 5 to 8 flowers. The anthers are 1 to 1.5 mm long. The caryopsis is tightly enclosed and is narrowly ellipsoid in outline. The chromosome number is 2n = 28.

== Distribution and habitat ==
The interrupted brome is endemic to south–central and south-eastern England and was formerly found from southern Lincolnshire south to eastern Kent and northern Somerset. It was last seen in the wild in Cambridgeshire in 1972 and is currently classified as extinct in the wild. Its demise is thought to have been due to improved seed cleaning methods, which effectively eradicated the species as a weed of crops. Since that time, the plant has persisted in cultivation in the United Kingdom. It has also been introduced to the Netherlands, where it is now established.

The plant was found primarily in waste places and as a weed in arable crops, particularly sainfoin (Onobrychis viciifolia), rye grass (Lolium perenne) and clover (Trifolium sp.). It was also found on the sides of roads and tracks.

=== Re-introduction ===
Philip M. Smith (1941–2004), a botanist from the University of Edinburgh who specialised in brome grasses, collected seeds in the 1970s from the last population of the interrupted brome in Cambridge. He germinated the seeds and grew the plants in a pot on his window sill. In 1979 at a Botanical Society of the British Isles conference he presented seeds to several of his colleagues. Through him the plants began to be cultivated at the Royal Botanic Gardens at Kew and Edinburgh.

Stewart Henchie, a botanist from Kew Gardens, began a project to re-introduce the interrupted brome into the wild. Under his leadership, Kew Gardens and Paignton Zoo grew large quantities of the plants to procure seeds for an eventual re-introduction. In 2003, seeds were sown in the wild on a farm in Whittlesford in Cambridgeshire under the protection of A. R. Arbon MBE. This was the first introduction into the wild under the supervision of Stewart Henchie the plants persisted until 2006 longer than the subsequent introduction at Aston Rowant. In the summer of 2004, more seeds were dispersed at English Nature's Aston Rowant National Nature Reserve in the Chilterns. The plants successfully germinated, fruited and persisted. This marked the first extinct plant to be re-introduced into the wild in British history.
