= High Leys =

Settlement in Cumbria, England

Coordinates: 54.550°N 3.451°W

High Leys, Rowrah
- Location within Cumbria
- OS grid reference: NY062181
- Civil parish: Lamplugh
- Unitary authority: Cumberland
- Ceremonial county: Cumbria
- Region: North West
- Country: England
- Sovereign state: United Kingdom
- Post town: FRIZINGTON
- Postcode district: CA26
- Police: Cumbria
- Fire: Cumbria
- Ambulance: North West
- UK Parliament: Whitehaven and Workington

High Leys is located to the south-east of Rowrah in Cumbria (map), along the C2C cycle route prior to Sheriffs Gate.

The status of national nature reserve was awarded to High Leys due to its meadow status and the traditional hay-making and grazing methods employed during the land's working lifetime.
