= Backshunt =

Railway track configuration to change direction where a curve would not fit

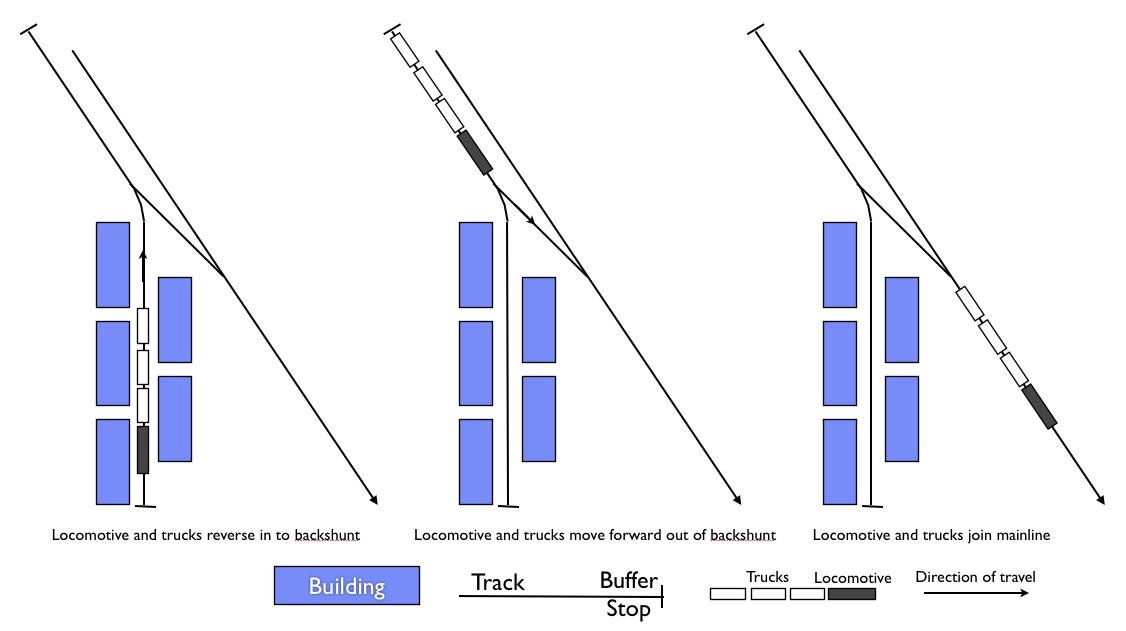
- An example of a backshunt from an industrial siding on to a mainline

A backshunt is a railway track configuration in situations where a change in (almost opposite) direction is required and a traditional curve cannot fit.

There are two main applications of a backshunt.

1. To climb or drop a steep incline using a zig zag
2. To change direction on to a parallel track, often used in industrial sidings.

== Example Backshunts ==
- Part of the old Cleator and Workington Junction Railway was maintained in Rowrah as a backshunt from Rowrah Head Quarry on to the Whitehaven, Cleator and Egremont Railway.

== See also ==
- Headshunt
