= Stodmarsh SSSI =

Nature reserve in Kent, England

Coordinates: 51.308°N 1.172°E

Stodmarsh
- Site of Special Scientific Interest
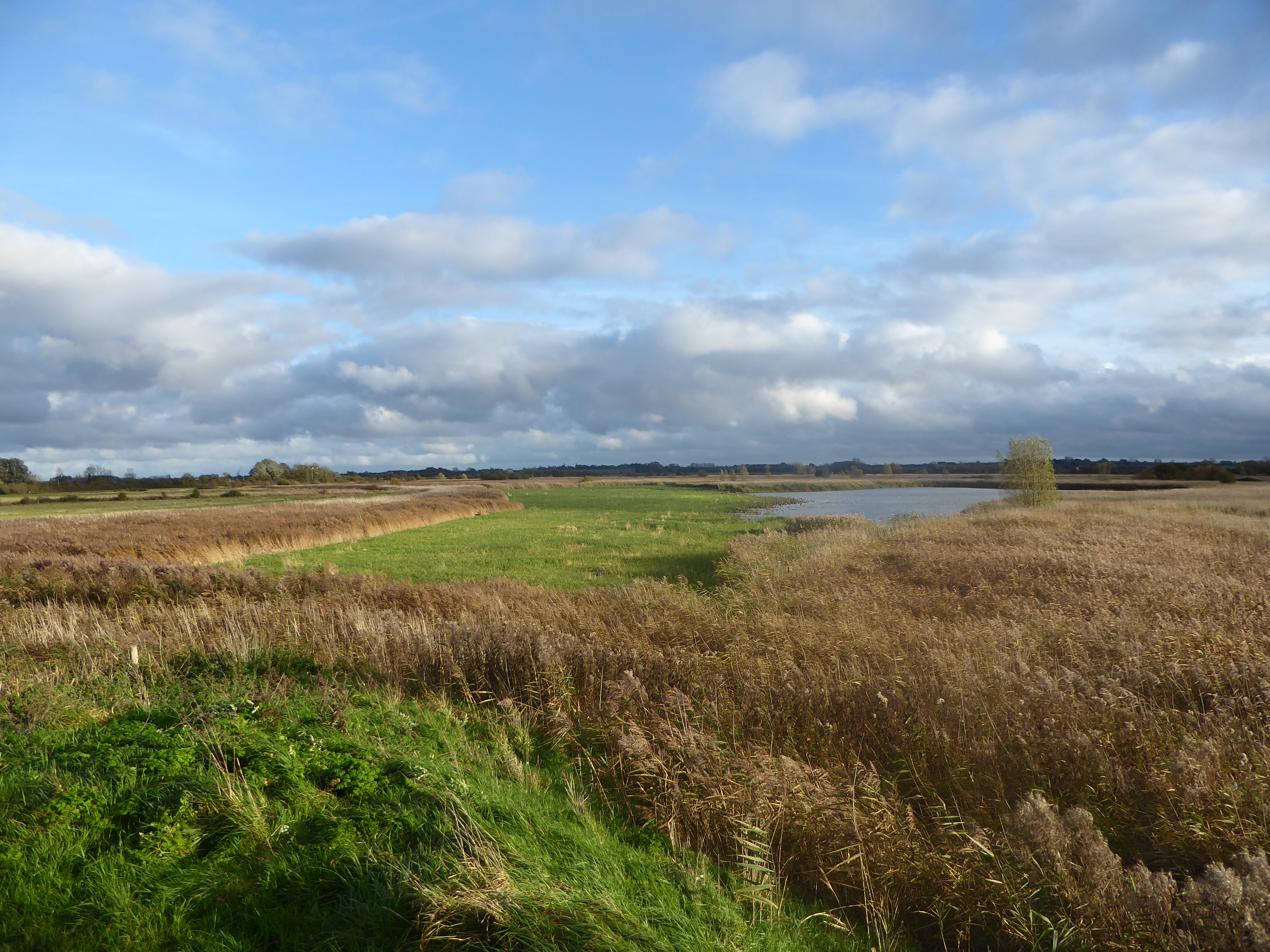
- Location of Stodmarsh.
- Area of search: Kent
- Grid reference: TR 212 613
- Interest: Biological
- Area: 623.2 hectares (1,540 acres)
- Notification date: 1984
- Location map: Magic Map

Designations

Ramsar Wetland
- Official name: Stodmarsh
- Designated: 16 December 1993
- Reference no.: 646

Stodmarsh SSSI is a 623.2-hectare (1,540-acre) biological Site of Special Scientific Interest near Stodmarsh, north-east of Canterbury in Kent. Parts of it are a Nature Conservation Review site, Grade I, a National Nature Reserve, a Ramsar internationally important wetland site, a Special Area of Conservation and a Special Protection Area under the European Union Directive on the Conservation of Wild Birds.

== National nature reserve ==
Stodmarsh NNR has an area of 250 hectares (620 acres) and lies within the SSSI. The reserve is open to the public. It consists of a number of different habitats that are important for wildlife:

- a large area of open water
- extensive reedbeds
- alder woodland and carr
- water meadows and rough grazing.

It is designated as one of only 35 "spotlight reserves" in England by Natural England in the list of national nature reserves in England. This is not strictly speaking a "natural" habitat – the area around Grove Ferry has been restored to wetland habitat by English Nature (now Natural England) and the areas of open water came about as a result of the flooding of areas used for gravel extraction or undermined by mining subsidence.

The Stodmarsh NNR now forms a central and ecologically important feature in the Kentish Stour Countryside Project and is an important site for the protection and encouragement of critically endangered aquatic mammal species such as the European otter and the water vole.

== Access ==
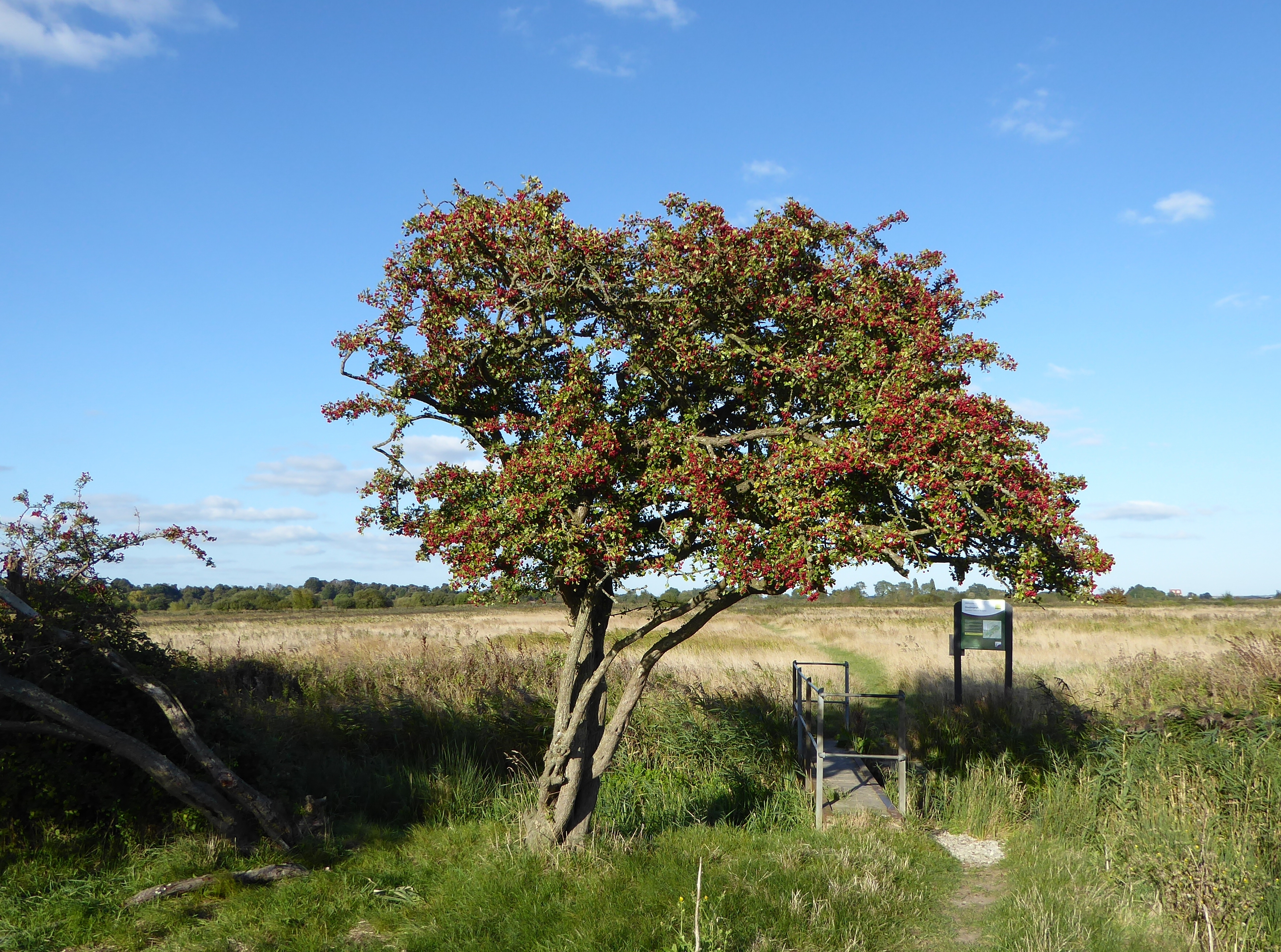
The footpath through the reserve

The Nature Reserve car park, operated by Natural England is along a lane from Stodmarsh village (grid ref TR221609, postcode CT3 4BE). There is a small voluntary charge for parking (as of 2022). Alternative parking is available at Grove Ferry (TR236631, CT3 4BP), operated by Kent County Council, where there is an obligatory charge. A public footpath leads through the reserve between these two points, with bird hides at intervals. Another, longer, path runs along the river to meet the reserve path at each end. The reserve may be visited at any time; entry is free.

== History ==
The valley of the River Stour around Stodmarsh was for centuries a series of flood meadows used primarily as pasture for cattle and horses. At the beginning of the 20th century, Chislet Colliery was established by the Anglo-Westphalian Coal Syndicate, from where a layer of coal-bearing rocks beneath the valley was mined, which eventually caused subsidence of the surface above. By the 1930s, extensive shallow lakes had formed between Fordwich and the confluence of the Stour and the Lampen stream, causing a cessation of farming in this area. The coal company used some of the land on the south side of the river for dumping spoil from the mine. The presence of large water bodies and stands of reedbed, combined with the relaxation of grazing, created a haven for migratory birds and other wildlife.

Interest in the natural history of the Stodmarsh valley was stimulated in 1947 by the field club of The King's School, Canterbury, which spent a year studying the site under the guidance of arts teacher David Stainer and biology master Cyril Ward. Their report includes a botanical survey by Francis Rose, which describes some of the characteristic species of the area. The SSSI was notified a few years later, in 1951, and the National Nature Reserve was later established on the (former) mining company's land west of the Lampen Wall. Over the next two decades, the NNR was expanded to encompass most of the land eastward along the valley as far as Grove Ferry.

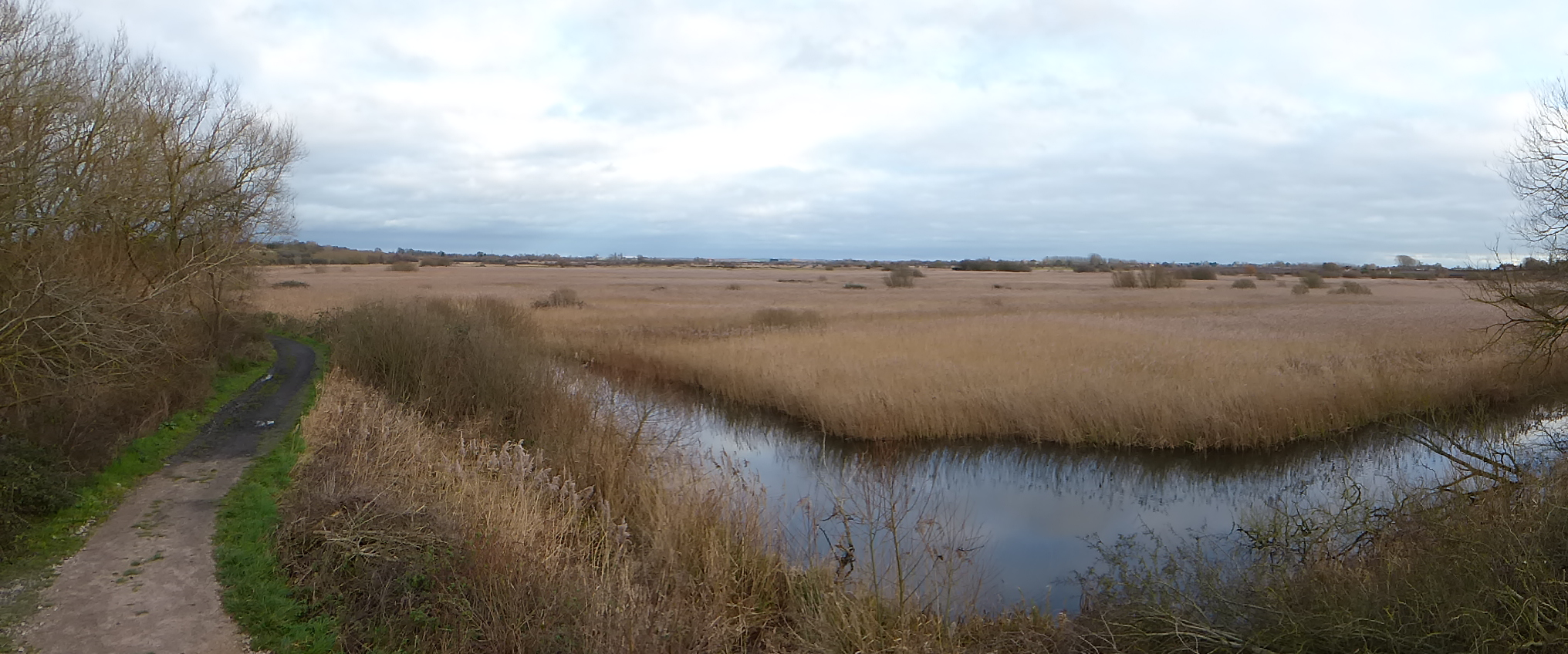
Extensive reedbed at Stodmarsh, viewed from the Lampen Wall

The ecological importance of the reserve was outlined in the Nature Conservation Review in 1977, where it was described as the largest reedbed in southern England and ranked as a Grade 1 site of national importance, primarily for its ornithological interest; most notably for the presence of a small population of bitterns, which thereby became a flagship species for the NNR. In order to enhance the habitat for these birds, hundreds of hectares of reedbed was subsequently created on the flood meadows immediately east of the Lampen Wall in the 1980s and west of the Grove Ferry road in the 1990s.

== Ecology ==
Nearly all of the land within the SSSI was, prior to the 20th century, flood meadow derived from saltmarsh about 1,000 years ago, as the Wantsum Channel silted up. The only exception is a small area of alder carr beside the Lampen Stream below the village of Stodmarsh. Only a small proportion of the original grassland remains; the rest has suffered from gravel extraction, subsided into shallow lakes, been buried under mine waste or deliberately flooded and converted to reedbed.

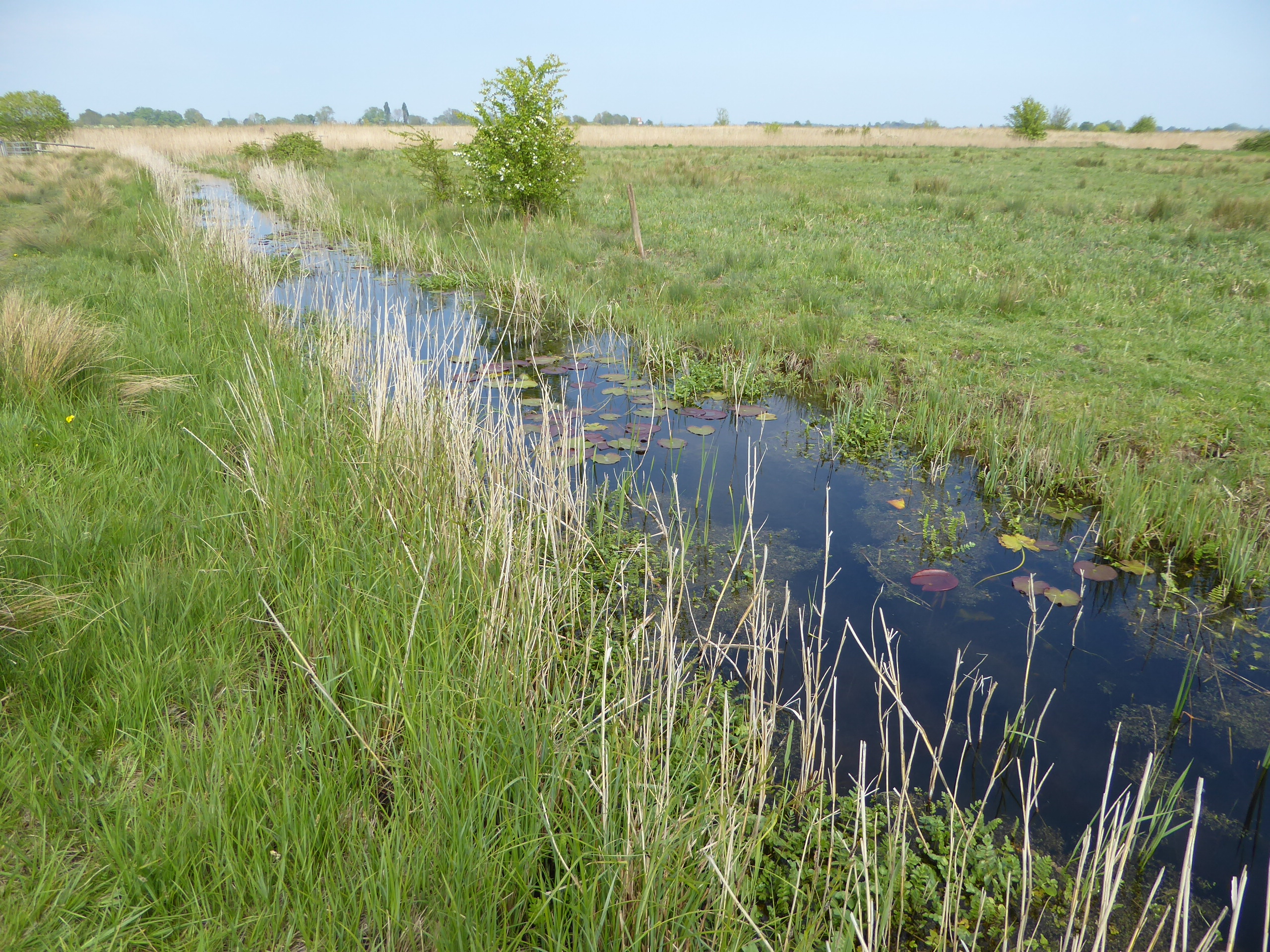
A species-rich ditch on the reserve

A key feature of the reserve is the drainage ditches, which have mostly remained intact through all these changes. Many of the species of importance in the site are associated with these ditches. The most significant, perhaps, is the nationally rare pondweed Potamogeton acutifolius, which occurs alongside ten other pondweed species. Other notable species in the ditches include the nationally rare shining ramshorn snail Segmentina nitida, the nationally scarce Desmoulin's whorl snail Vertigo moulinsiana, the great silver water beetle Hydrophilus piceus, and a micromoth called the Kentish neb, Monochroa niphognatha, which is found nowhere else in Britain. Water voles, otters and beavers are frequently seen in the ditches, as are 17 species of Odonata.

The grassland is nearly as ancient as the ditches, and is notable for its coastal character, with divided sedge Carex divisa, saltmarsh rush Juncus gerardii and narrow-leaved bird's-foot trefoil Lotus tenuis as typical constituents. Eight species of bat frequent the meadows, most notably notule and serotine, which often feed on dung beetles. Marsh harriers and hen harriers also favour this habitat.

The reedbeds have a typical fauna for this habitat, including bearded tit, sedge warbler and reed warbler, and the subsidence lakes and artificial pools are popular with birdwatchers for migratory and wetland birds. The NNR has become famous for attracting rare and endangered bird species.

== Water quality issue ==
In 2020 Natural England issued formal advice on nutrient neutrality in the Stour catchment, in response to concern about the state of the SSSI. The background to this was that two of the lakes in particular, Stodmarsh Lake in the NNR and Collards Lake in the SSSI, had been judged to be in unfavourable condition owing to enrichment by nitrogen and phosphorus pollution, which are thought to result mainly from discharges from sewage treatment works. The pollutants enrich the lakes, causing an algal bloom and fish die-off, threatening populations of protected birds and the wildlife of the SSSI in general. The 'advice' obliges local authorities to ensure that any new developments within the catchment of the River Stour do not add to the nutrient burden of the river, which has effectively stalled the building of thousands of houses in Canterbury and Ashford.

Southern Water, the utility company responsible for operating the sewage works in question, responded with its own position statement, which states that the company is not empowered to undertake improvements without regulatory approval, and that any such improvements would be unlikely to occur before 2030.
