= Bridgham and Brettenham Heaths =

UK Site of Special Scientific Interest

Coordinates: 52.442°N 0.828°E

- Site of Special Scientific Interest
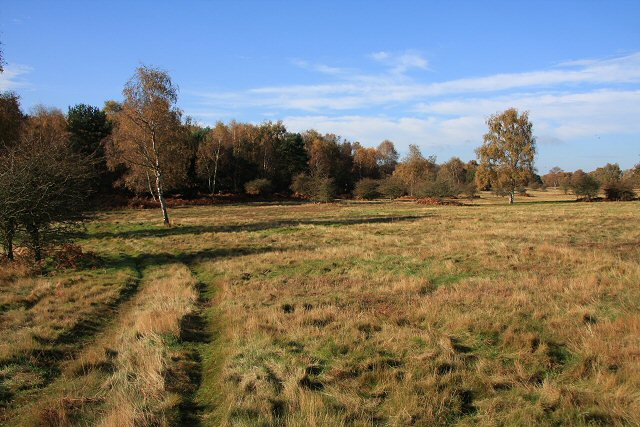
- Brettenham Heath
- Location of Bridgham and Brettenham Heaths.
- Area of search: Norfolk
- Grid reference: TL 923 864
- Interest: Biological
- Area: 439.9 hectares (1,087 acres)
- Notification date: 1982
- Location map: Magic Map

Bridgham and Brettenham Heaths is a 439.9-hectare (1,087-acre) biological Site of Special Scientific Interest north-east of Thetford in Norfolk, England. It is a Nature Conservation Review site, Grade I, and part of the Breckland Special Area of Conservation and Special Protection Area. Brettenham Heath is a National Nature Reserve.

The dominant plants on this dry acidic heath are heather and wavy hair-grass. There are also areas of scrub and woodland. The site supports many species of breeding birds, including common curlews and nightjars.

The site is in two separate areas, which are open to the public.
