= Muston Meadows =

Protected area in Leicestershire, England

Coordinates: 52.919°N 0.775°W

- Site of Special Scientific Interest
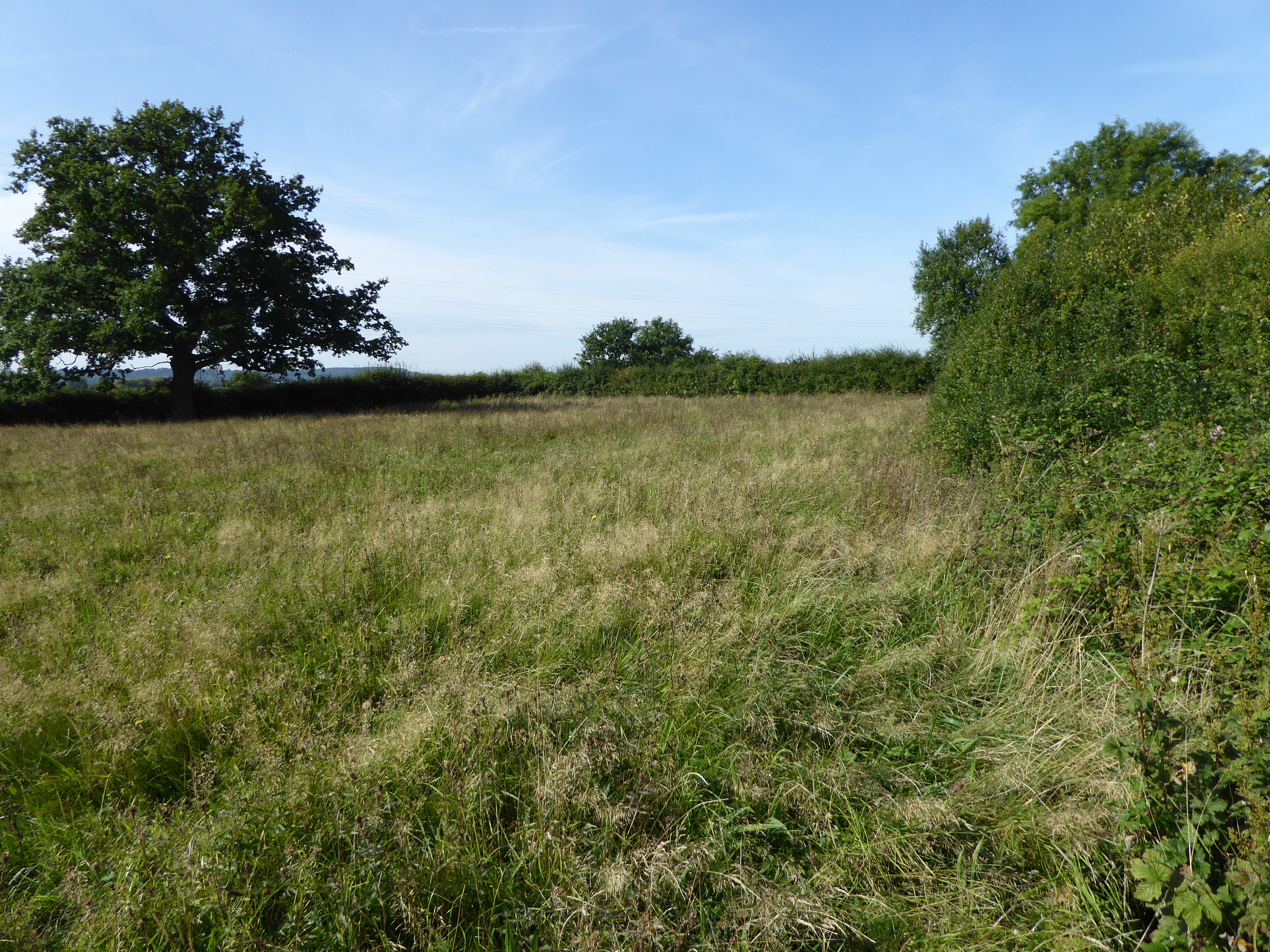
- Location of Muston Meadows.
- Area of search: Leicestershire
- Grid reference: SK 825 368
- Interest: Biological
- Area: 8.8 hectares
- Notification date: 1983
- Location map: Magic Map

Muston Meadows is an 8.8-hectare (22-acre) biological Site of Special Scientific Interest south of Muston in Leicestershire. It is also a National Nature Reserve and a Nature Conservation Review site.

These ridge and furrow meadows are on soils derived from clay. Herbs include green-winged orchid, lady's bedstraw, yellow rattle, pepper saxifrage and cowslip.

The site is in two different areas, both of which are open to the public.

At Muston Meadows, hay is cut in late summer and over winter the meadow is grazed by cattle. This prevents the meadow habitat from transitioning to forest through ecological succession. Some of the plants in the nature reserve only grow in meadows and this kind of habitat is very threatened in the UK; 97% of Britain's wildflower meadows have been destroyed since the 1930s.
