= Aston Rowant National Nature Reserve =

Protected area in the UK

Coordinates: 51.665°N 0.95°W

Aston Rowant
- Site of Special Scientific Interest
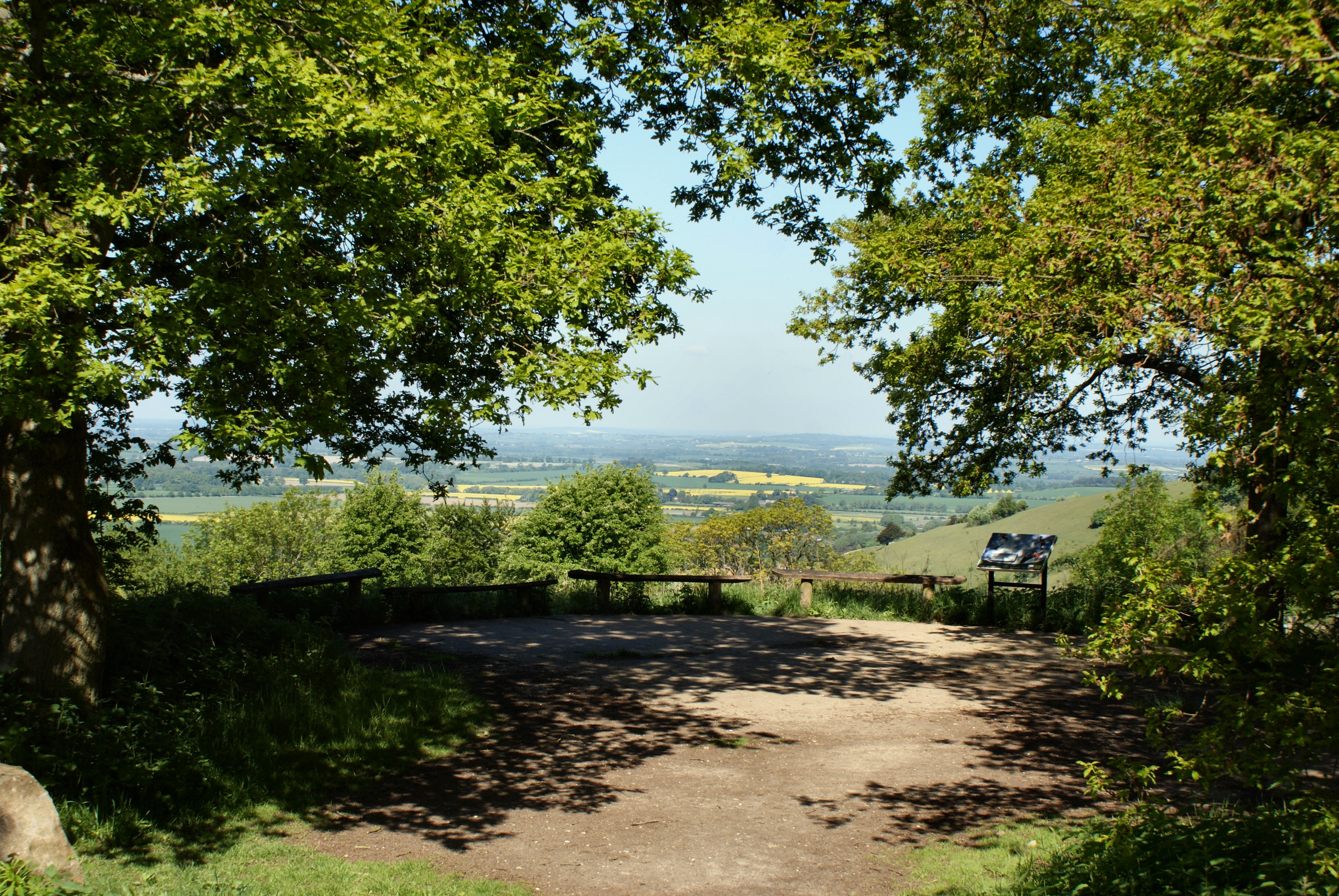
- Aston Rowant NNR view from Chiltern Chalk escarpment in the reserve over Oxford Clay plain, looking west
- Location of Aston Rowant.
- Area of search: Oxfordshire; Buckinghamshire
- Grid reference: SU728972
- Interest: Biological
- Area: 128.5 hectares (318 acres)
- Notification date: 1988
- Location map: Magic Map

Aston Rowant National Nature Reserve is located on the north-west escarpment of the Chiltern Hills, in the Chilterns Area of Outstanding Natural Beauty. It has an area of 159.1 hectares (393 acres), and most of it is a 128.5 hectares (318 acres) biological Site of Special Scientific Interest. It is listed as a Grade 1 site in A Nature Conservation Review. The reserve is in several sections, mostly in the parish of Lewknor in Oxfordshire, with smaller sections in the parish of Stokenchurch in Buckinghamshire.

The reserve is home to plants and butterflies of chalk grassland. The flowers include at least seven species of orchid and the Chiltern gentian; the butterflies include the silver-spotted skipper and the Adonis blue.

As well as chalk grassland, the reserve contains woodland with beech, yew, and juniper. Overhead, reintroduced red kites are resident.

== Habitats ==
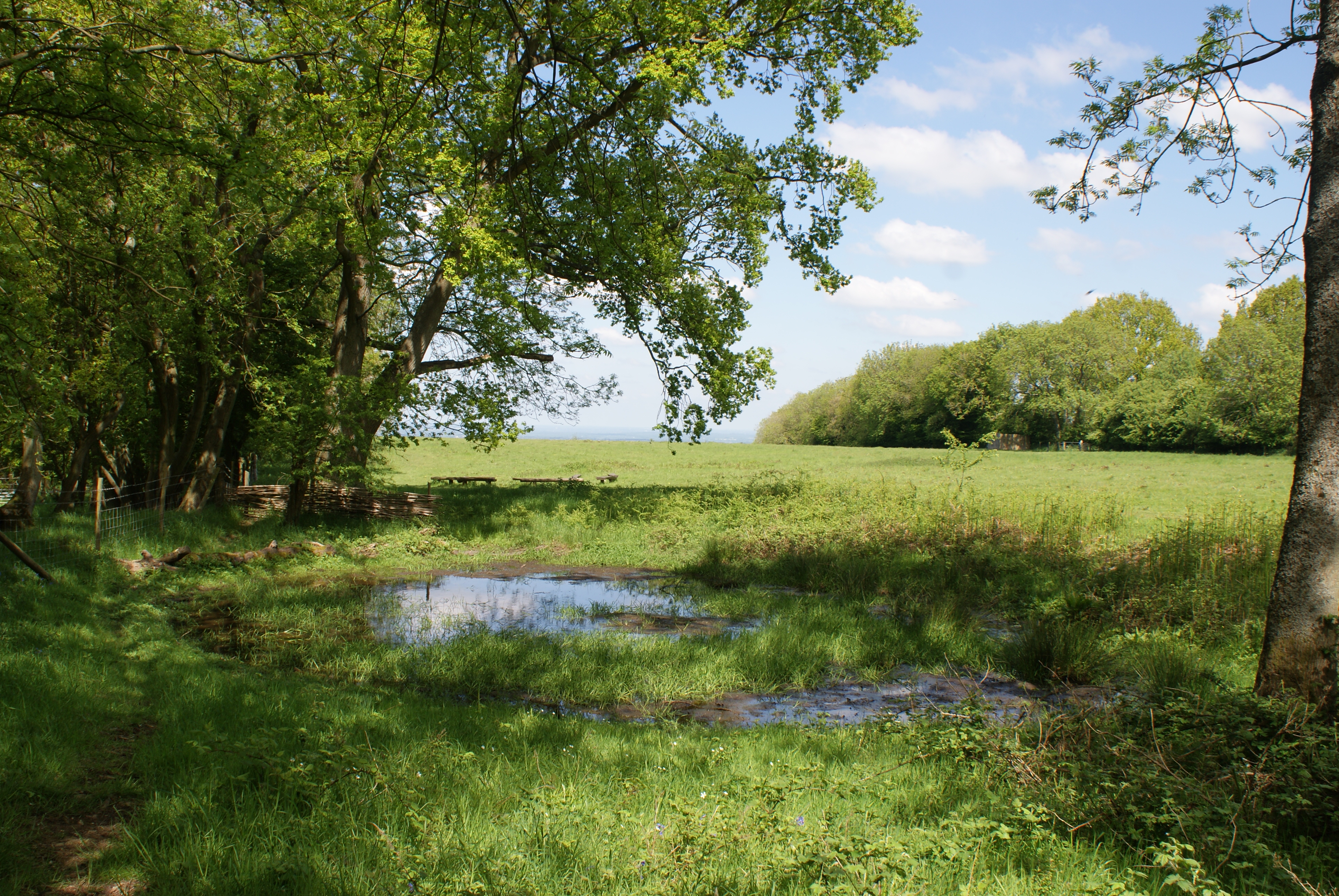
Dew-pond at Aston Rowant NNR

The Aston Rowant reserve is managed by Natural England assisted by the Oxford Conservation Volunteers. It offers a nationally important habitat of chalk grassland and juniper scrub with significant areas of hanging beechwood at Aston Rowant Wood.

=== Flowers ===
Aston Rowant is especially noted in spring and summer for the wildflowers and orchids associated with close-cropped chalk grassland, managed by careful grazing regimes. Orchid species recorded include common spotted orchid, fragrant orchid, pyramidal orchid, bee orchid, frog orchid, early purple orchid and greater butterfly orchid. Other flowers include eyebright, scabious, marjoram, Chiltern gentian, and yellow-wort.

Flowers at Aston Rowant NNR

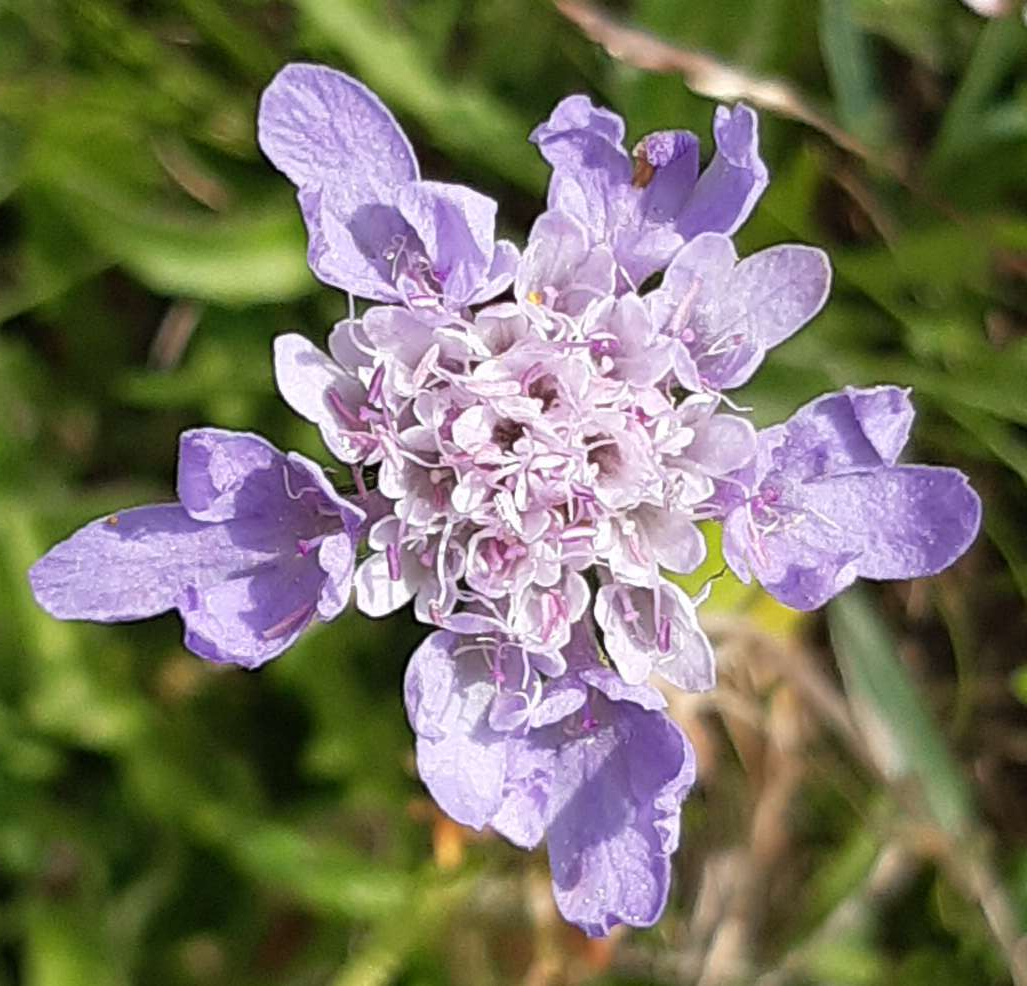
Small scabious

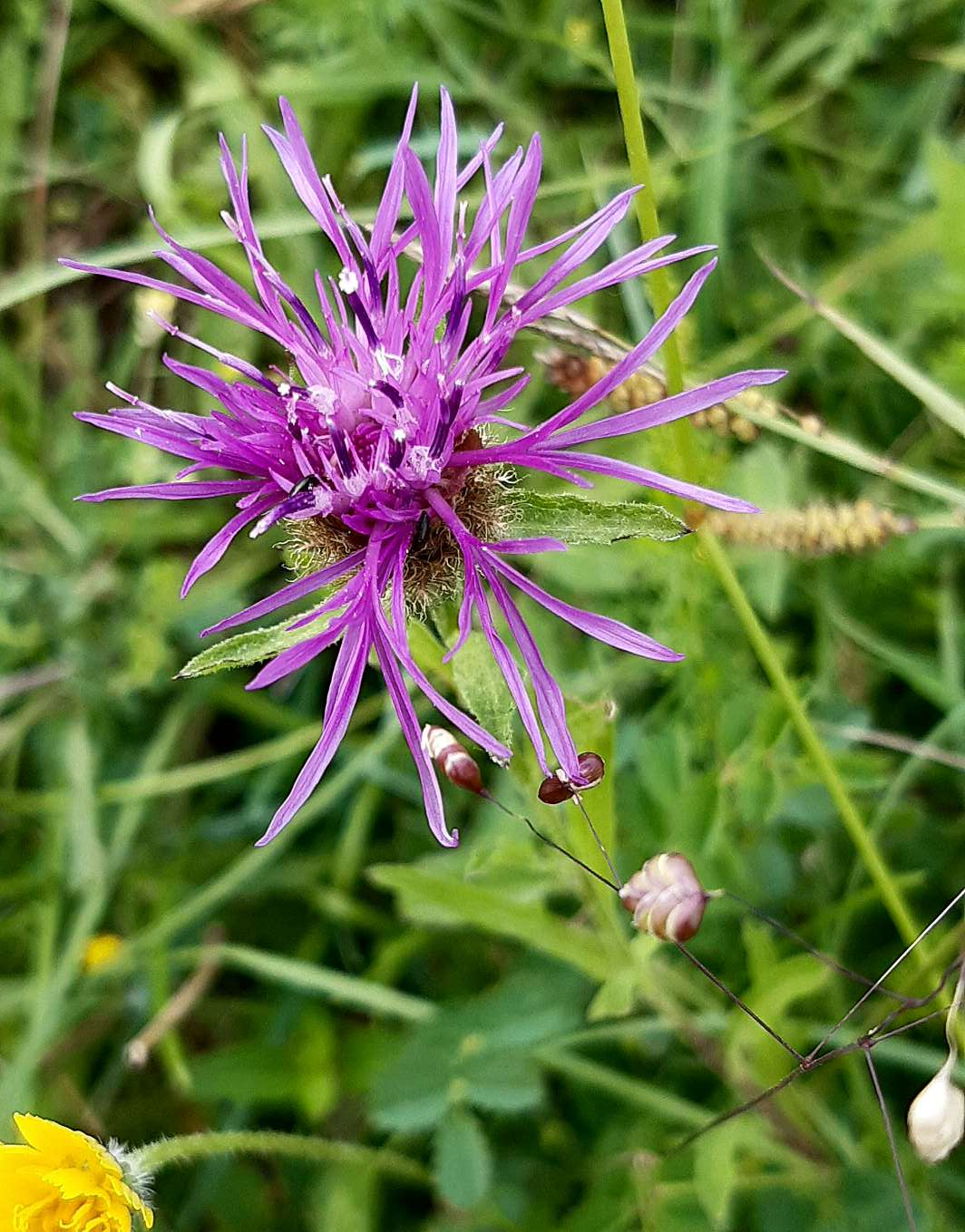
Centaurea

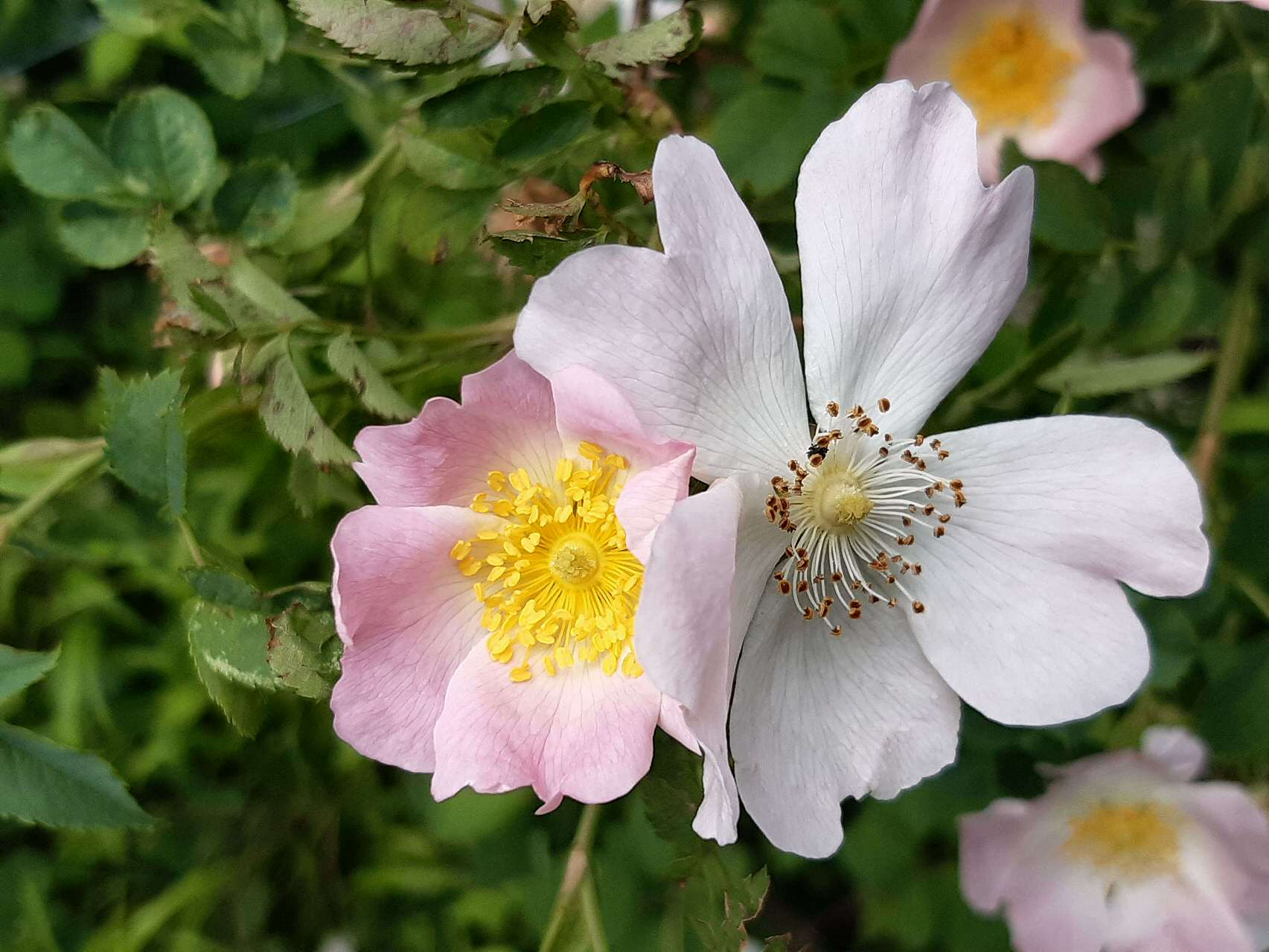
Dog rose
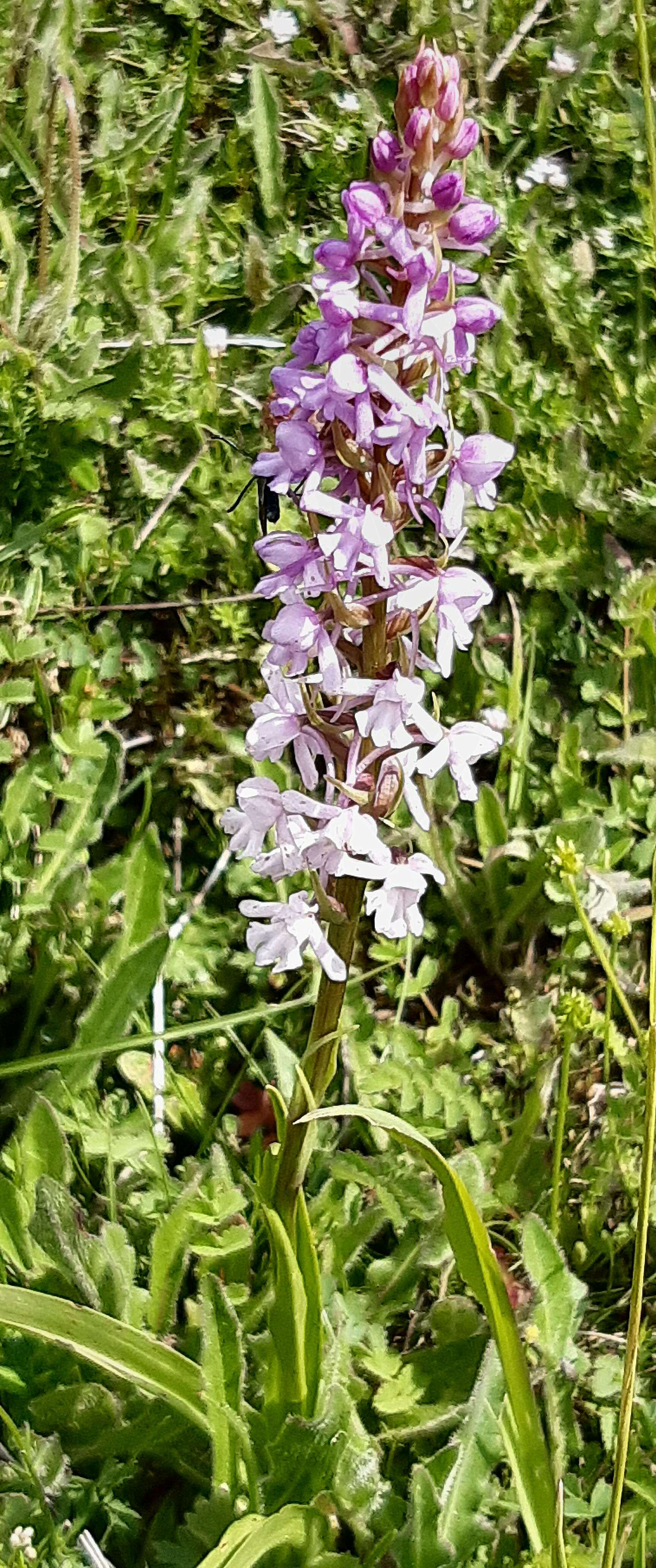
Chalk fragrant orchid

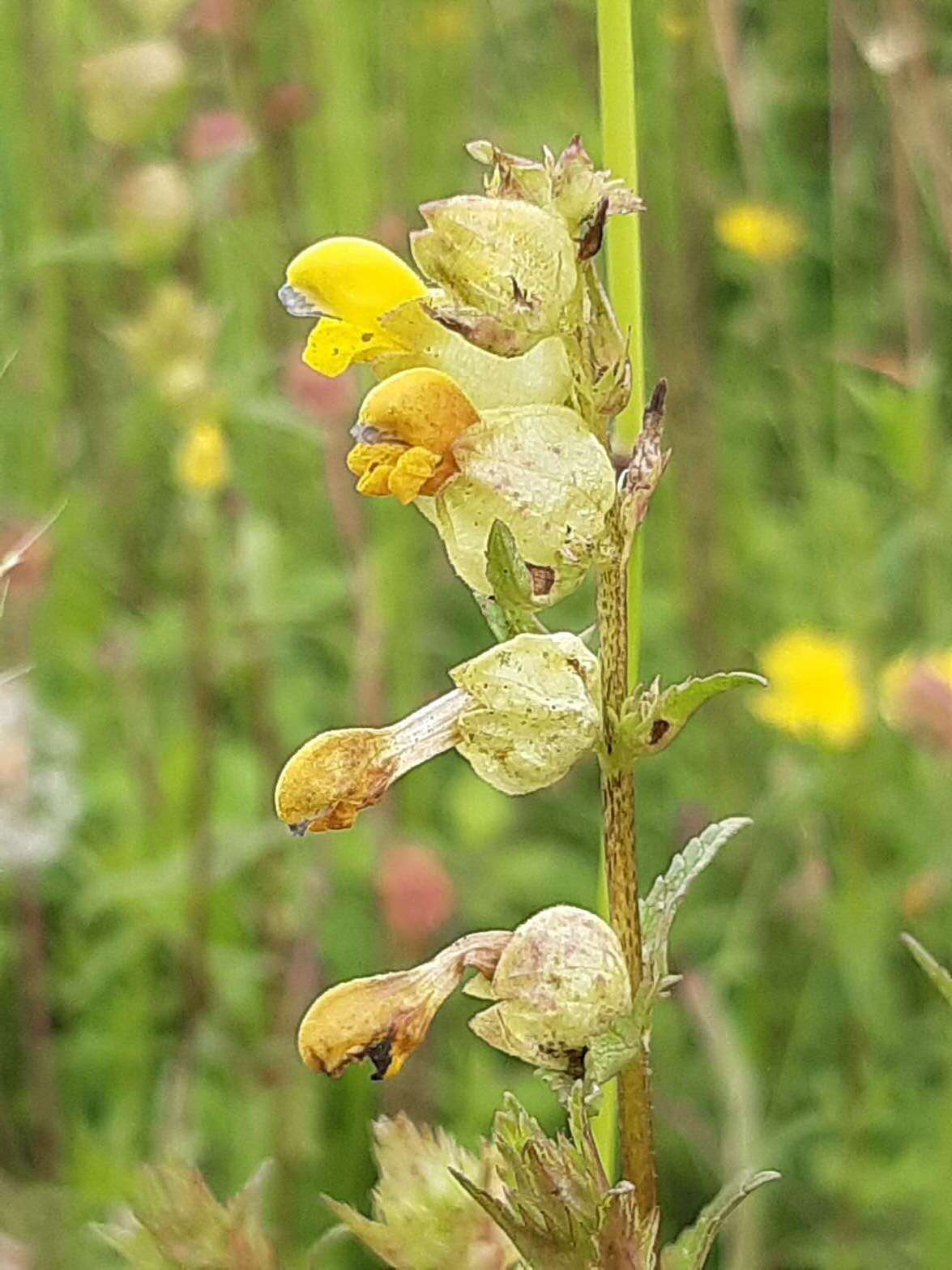
Yellow rattle

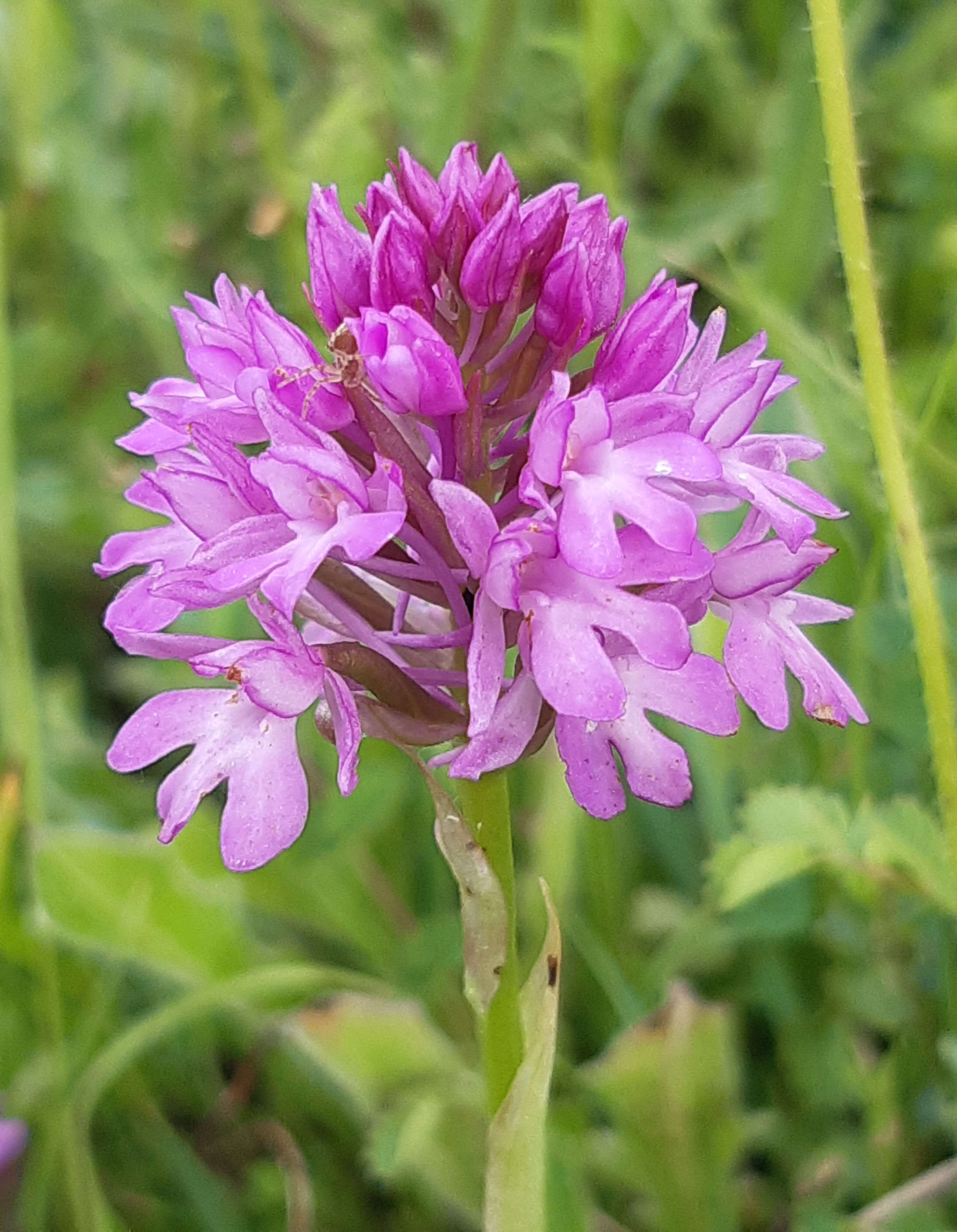
Pyramidal orchid

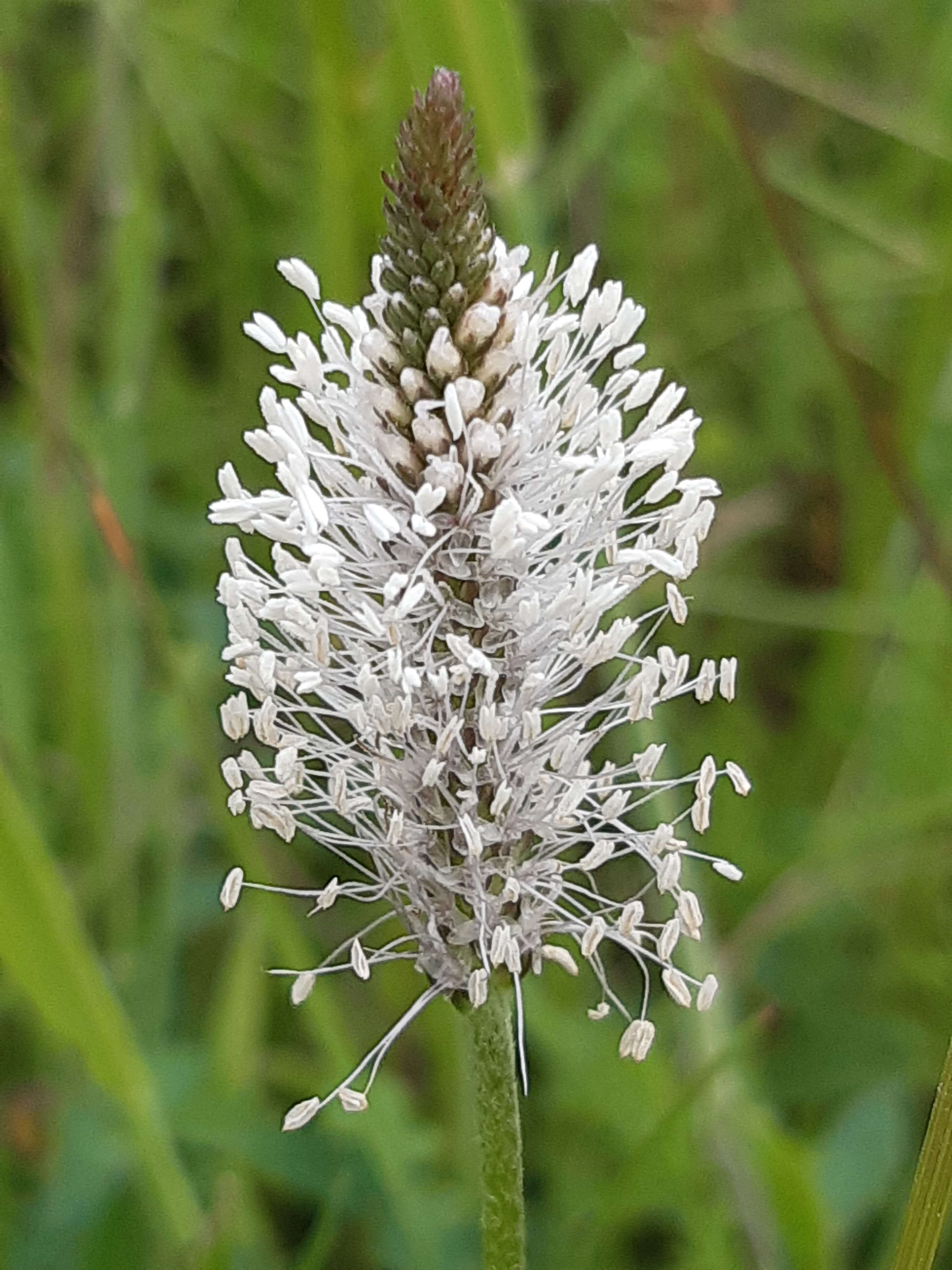
Hoary plantain

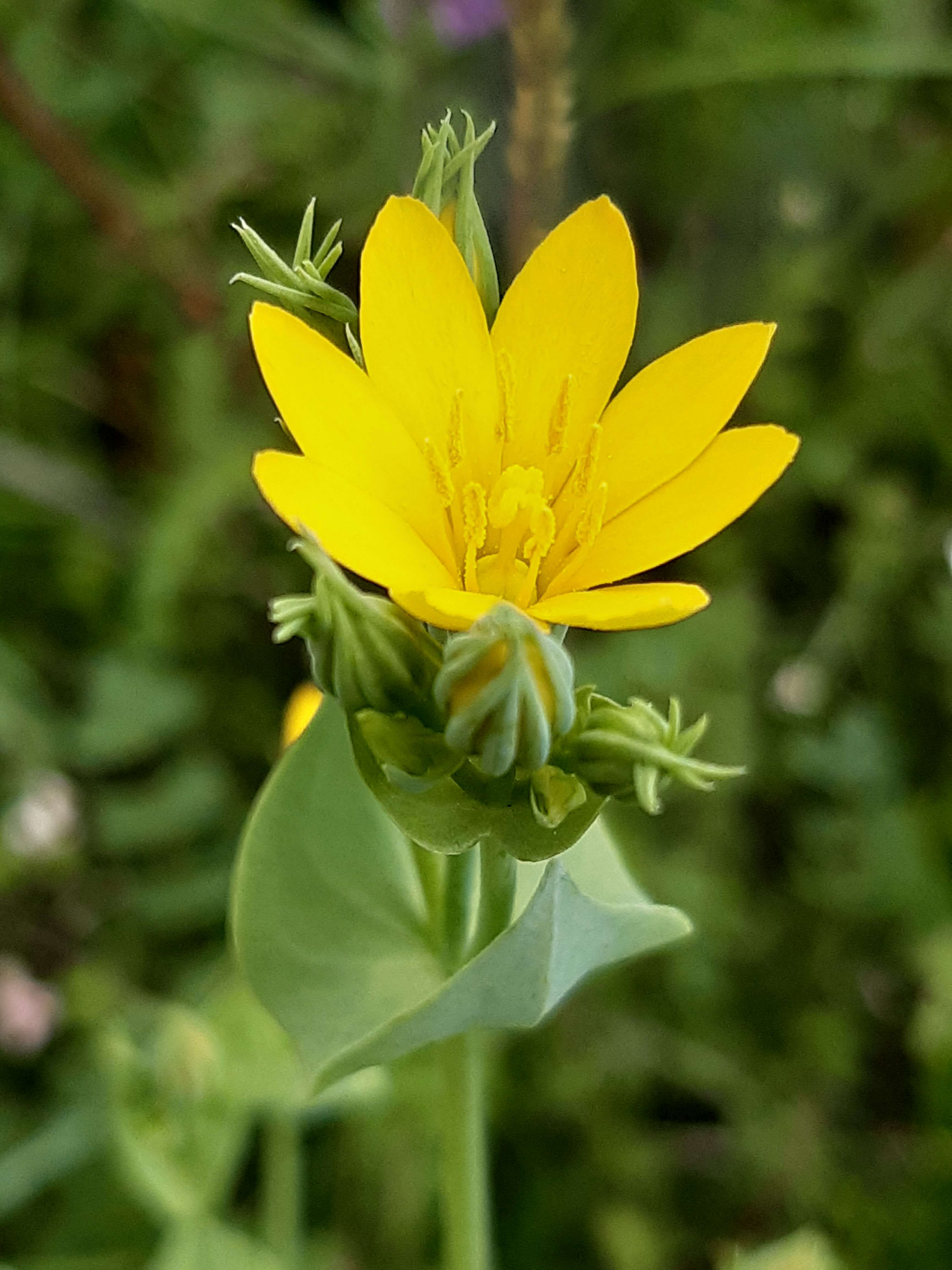
Yellow-wort

=== Butterflies ===
The chalk grassland habitat is particularly attractive to many species of butterflies such as the Adonis blue, the chalkhill blue, marbled white, silver-spotted skipper, the dark green fritillary, and the silver-washed fritillary. Over 30 species of butterflies have been recorded on the reserve.

Butterflies at Aston Rowant NNR

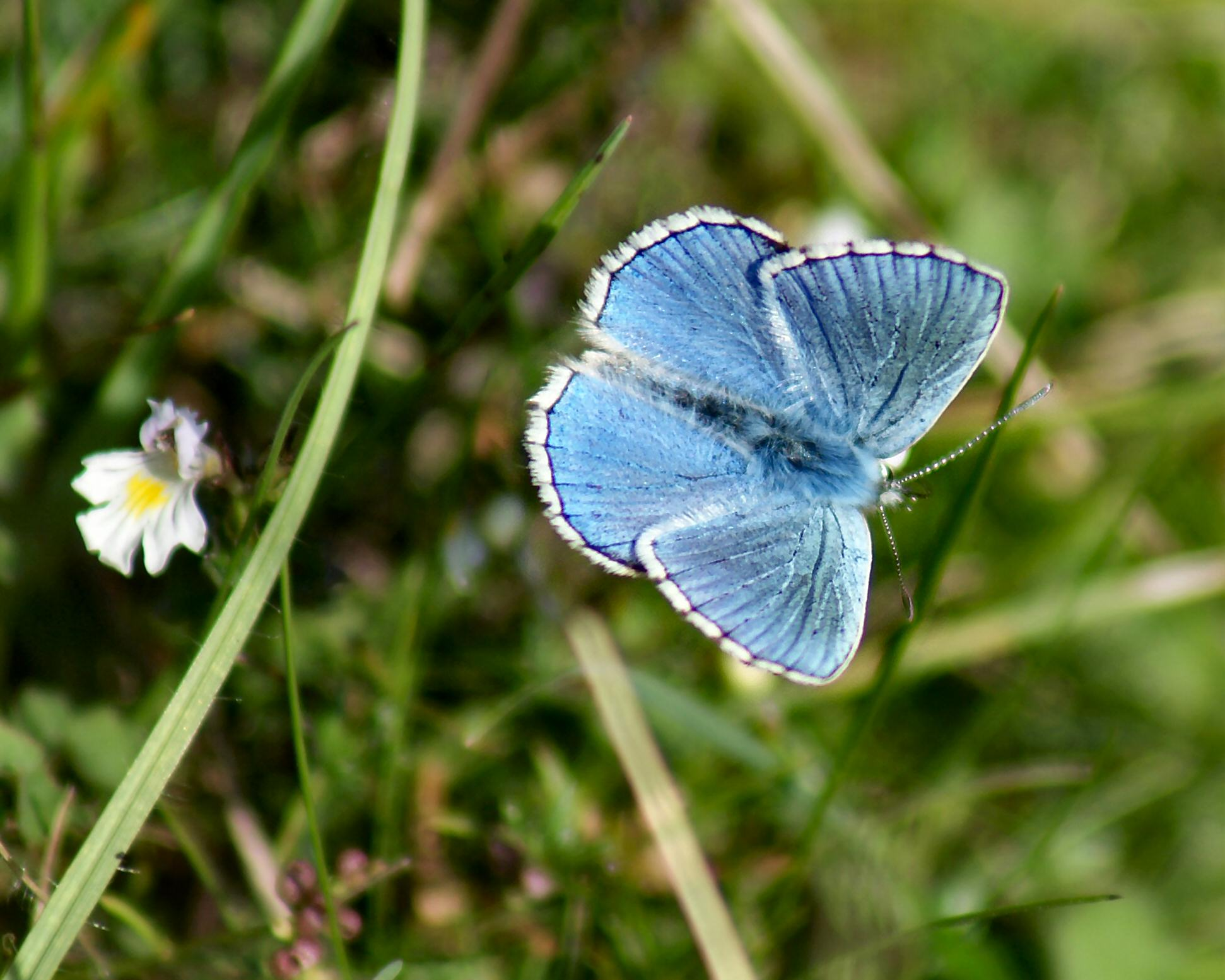
Adonis blue, Lysandra bellargus

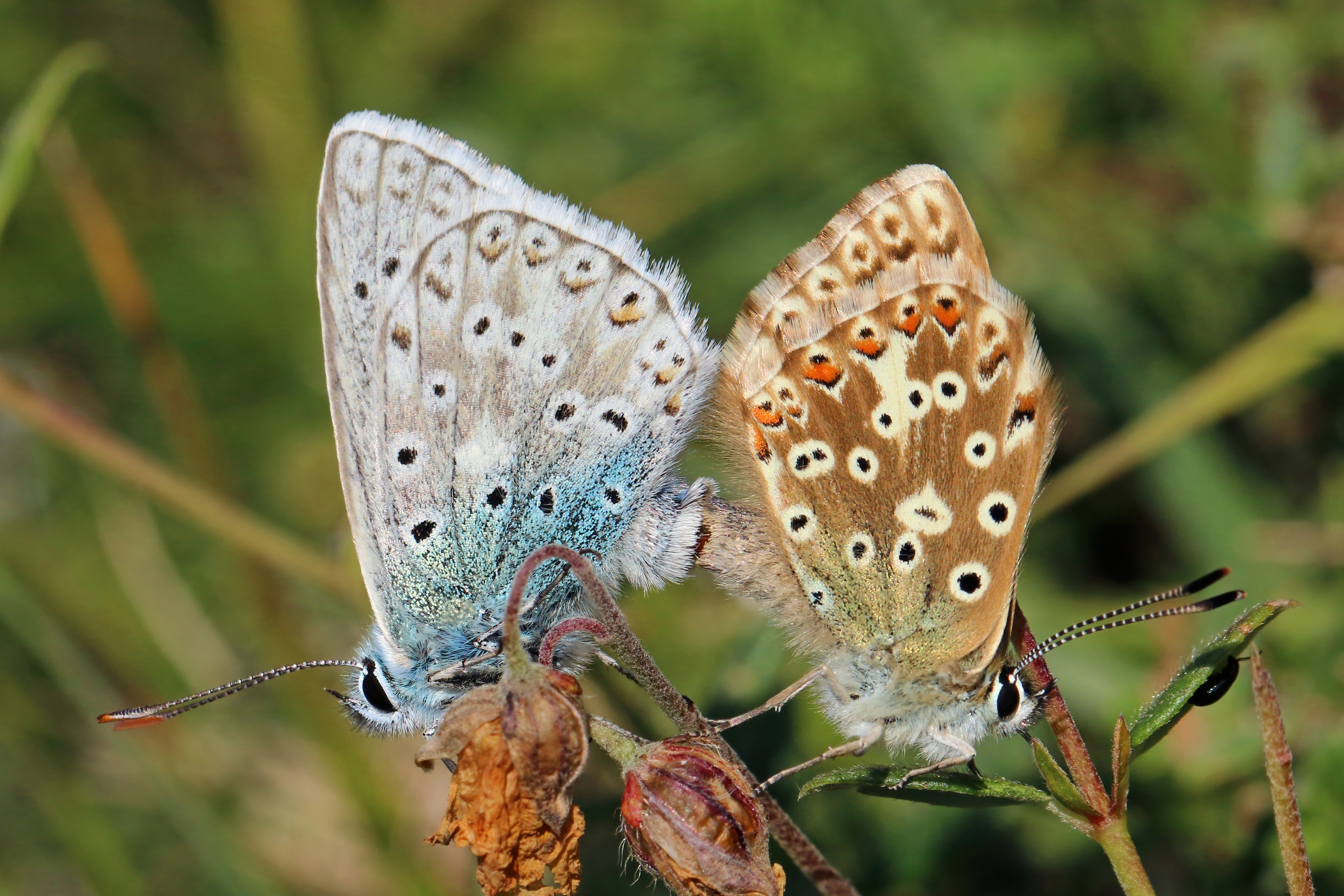
Chalkhill blue, Polyommatus coridon

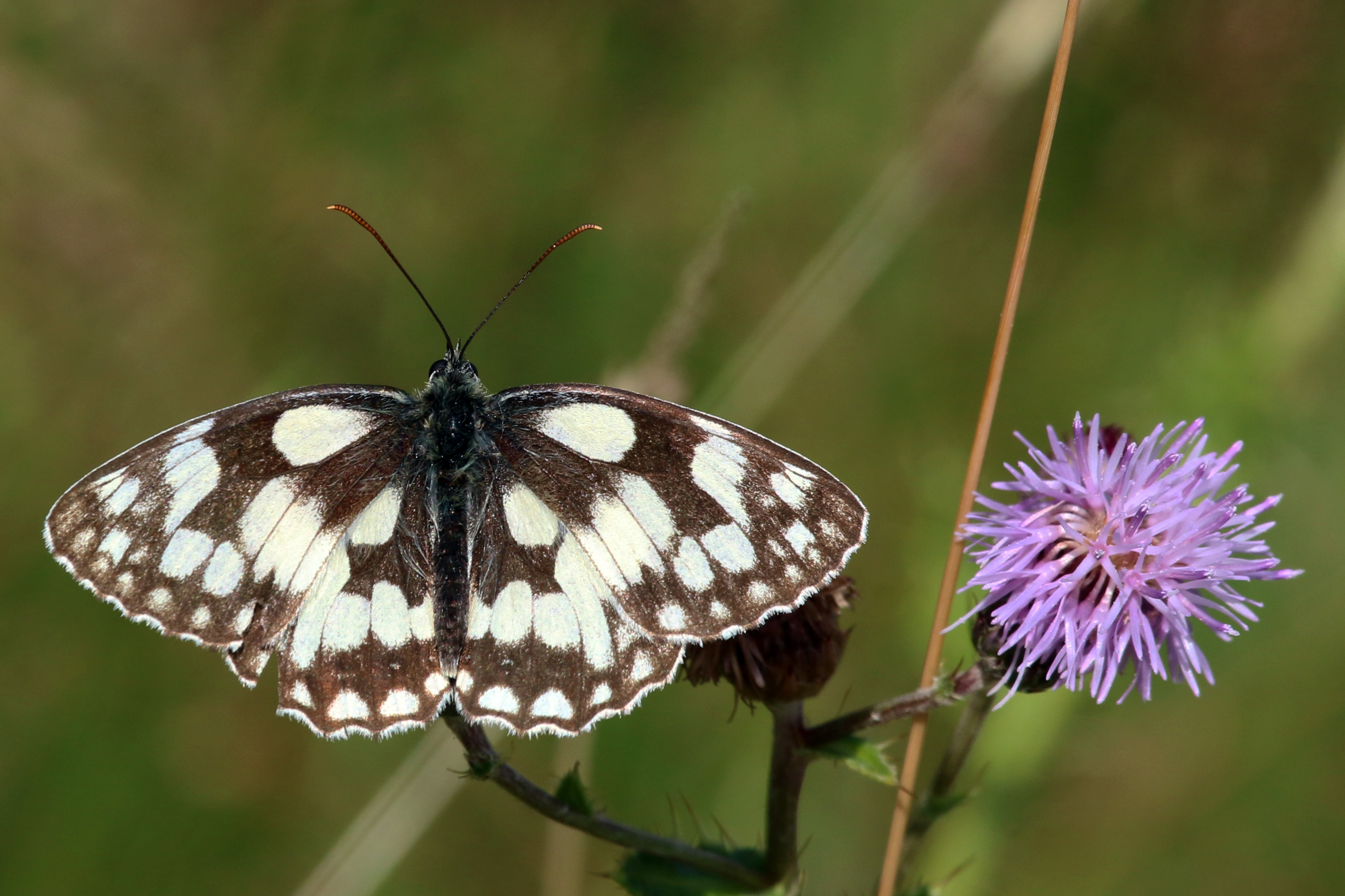
Marbled white, Melanargia galathea

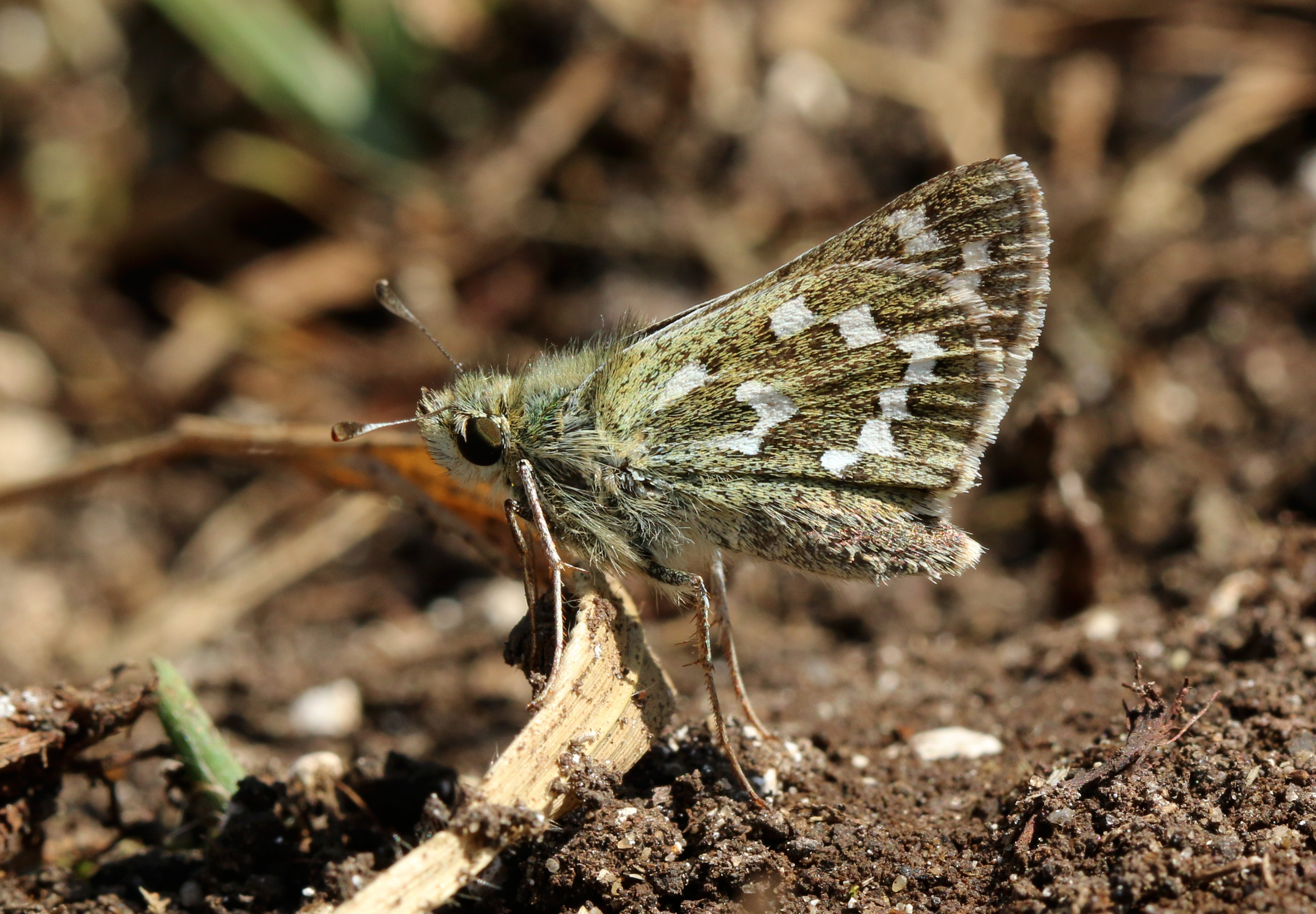
Silver-spotted skipper, Hesperia comma

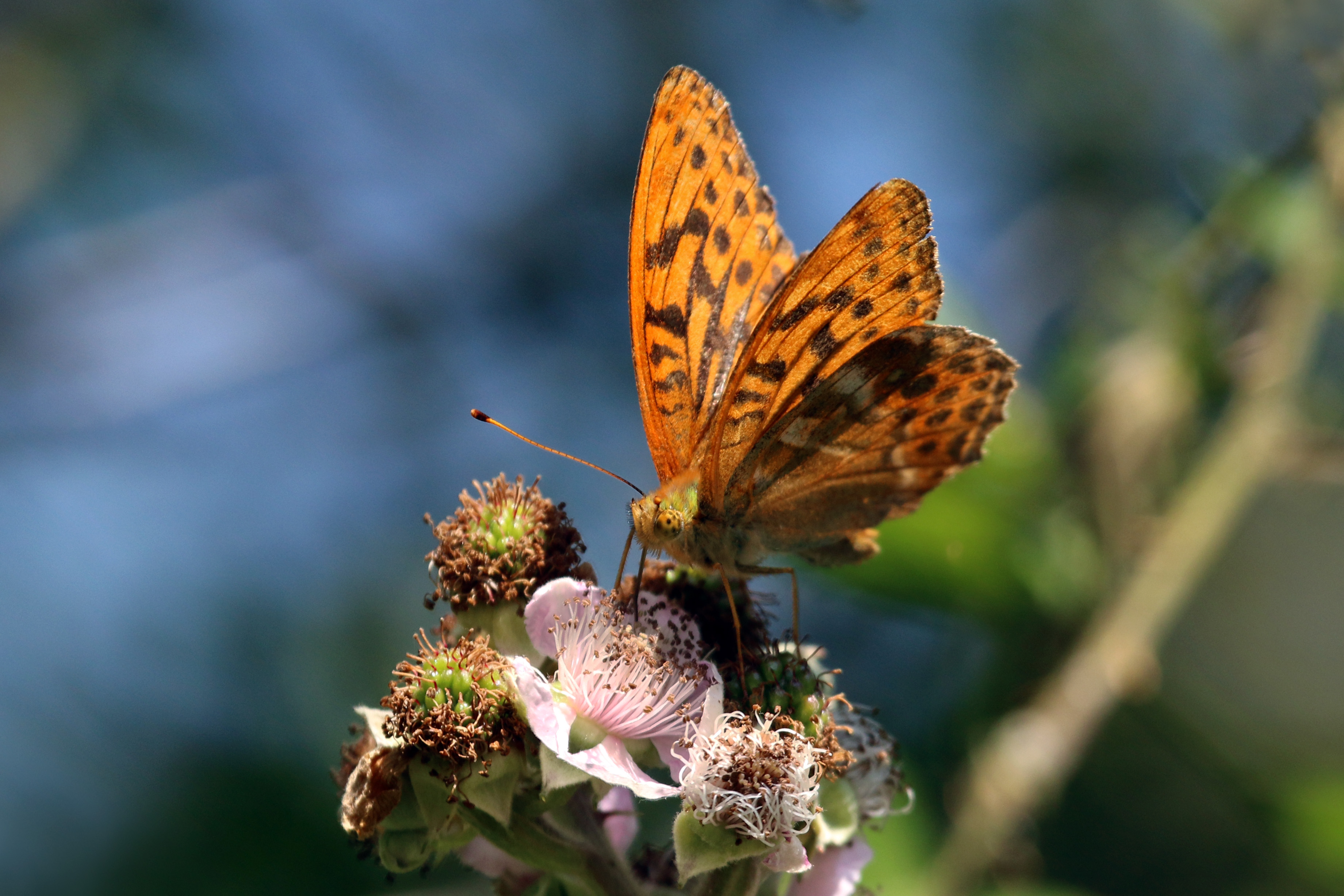
Silver-washed fritillary, Argynnis paphia

=== Mammals ===
Muntjac and roe deer are found on the reserve, as are the brown hare. Aston Rowant is an important conservation site for the endangered hazel dormouse.

== Reintroductions ==
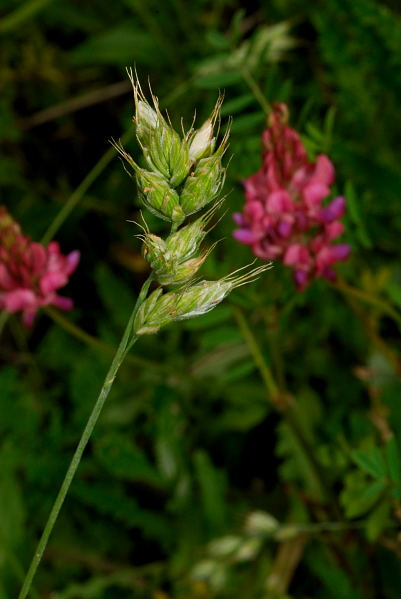
Interrupted brome grass, extinct in the wild at that time, was reintroduced to the reserve in 2004.

In 1989, the Aston Rowant NNR became one of the initial four sites selected by the RSPB and Natural England for the reintroduction to England of the red kite, which had become extinct in England and Scotland due to persecution since the early 1900s, and reduced to a residual population of a few dozen pairs in central Wales. Initially birds were brought in from Spain but the reintroduction programme based in the Chilterns was so successful that the local population has now self-generated to a level of approximately 200 pairs and chicks are now taken from the Chilterns population for reintroduction projects elsewhere in the UK.

In the summer of 2004, seeds of the interrupted brome grass, which had become extinct in the wild, were dispersed at the Aston Rowant NNR. The plants successfully germinated, fruited and persisted. This marked the first extinct plant to be re-introduced into the wild in British history.

== M40 controversy ==
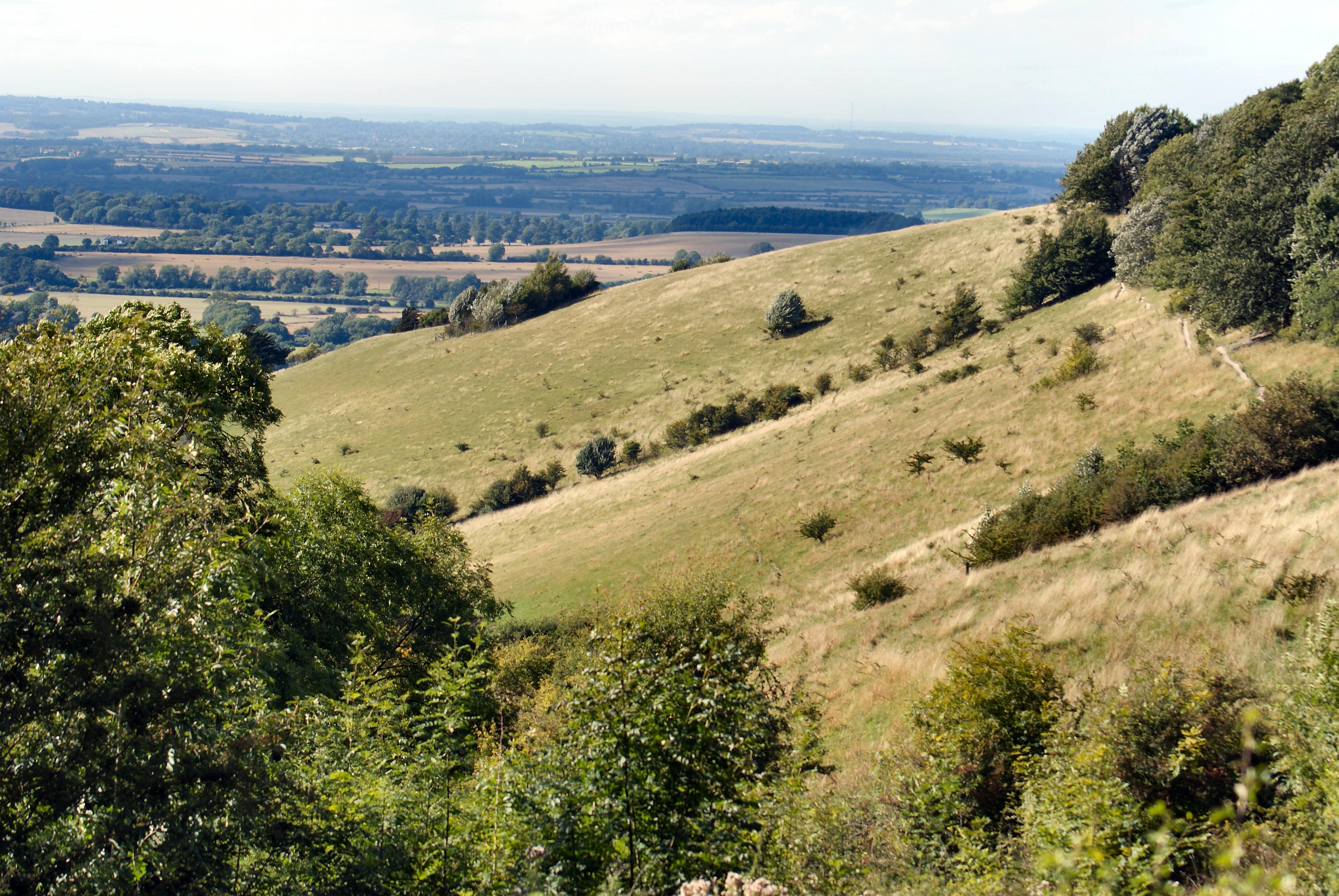
Chalk grassland hill slopes on the Chilterns escarpment, Aston Rowant NNR

The M40 motorway passes through the reserve, where the Aston Rowant Cutting creates an important geological exposure of the Coniacian chalk strata, and drops the motorway down onto the Oxfordshire plain between Junction 5 Stokenchurch and junction 6 Watlington. This section of the "Midlands Link" motorway opened in 1974 after a Public Enquiry. The event helped to motivate conservation groups to oppose infrastructure projects that would damage protected natural habitats, such as the M3 cutting through Twyford Down near Winchester, which could have been protected by tunnelling.
