= Saltfleetby-Theddlethorpe Dunes National Nature Reserve =

Nature reserve in Lincolnshire, England

Satlfleetby-Theddlethorpe Dunes
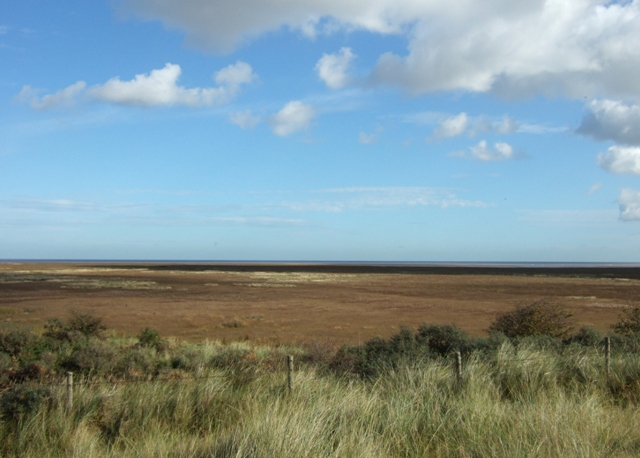

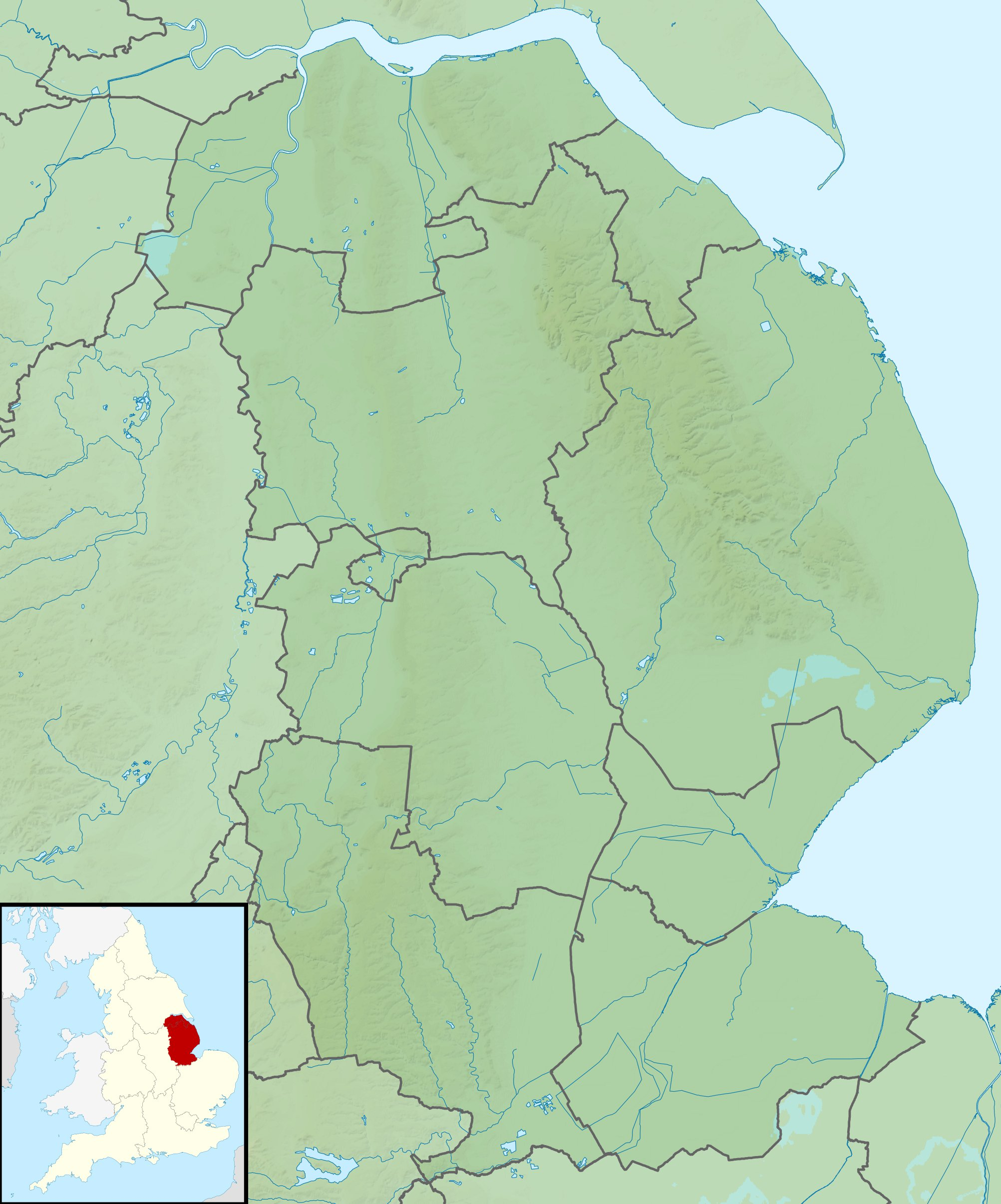
- Location within Lincolnshire
- Coordinates: 53.4023°N 0.2064°E
- Area: 951 hectares (2,350 acres)
- Manager: Natural England

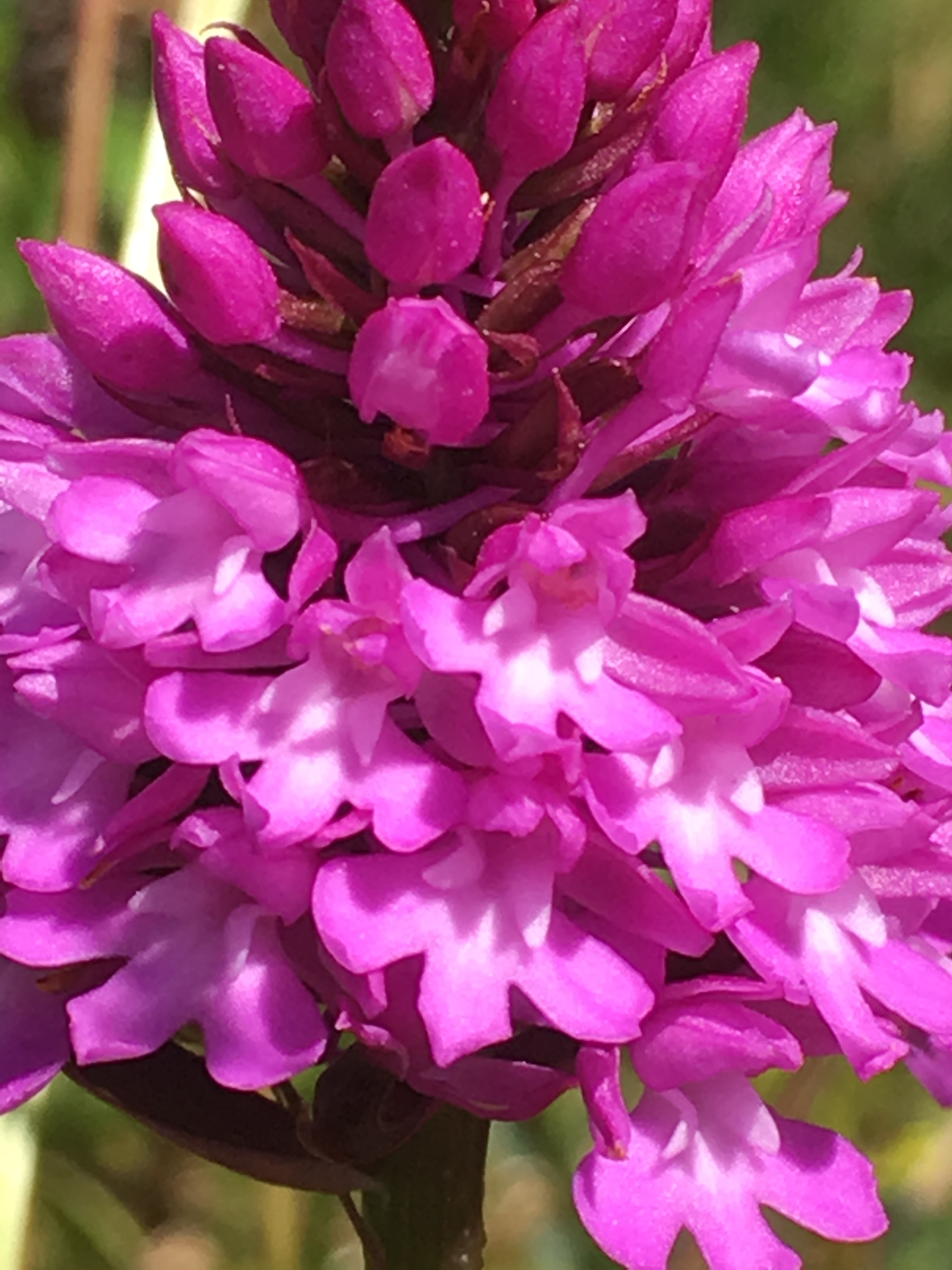
Pyramidal orchid on the dunes in 2018

Saltfleetby-Theddlethorpe Dunes is a national nature reserve on the coast of Lincolnshire, England, in the parishes of Saltfleetby and Theddlethorpe. It is managed in part by Natural England; in part by the Lincolnshire Wildlife Trust, and consists of 1,377 acres (557 ha) of sand dunes, salt marsh, sand and mudflats. It is on Rimac Road and sometimes referred to as Rimac.

The reserve is one of only around 60 places in the UK where the natterjack toad is found. In summer, many species of orchids can be seen on the dunes and dune slacks. Other wildlife includes cuckoo, barn owl and six-spot burnet moth.

A large part of the reserve, close to the car park, is wheelchair-friendly.
