= Jacob Thompson (painter) =

English landscape painter

- Born: 28 August 1806; Penrith, Cumberland, England
- Died: 27 December 1879 (aged 73); Hackthorpe, Westmorland, England
- Resting place: St. Michael's Church, Lowther
- Spouse(s): Ann Parker Bidder (d.1844); Elizabeth Varty
- Children: 1

Jacob Thompson (28 August 1806 – 27 December 1879) was an English landscape painter.

== Biography ==
=== Early years ===
Jacob Thompson, eldest son of Merrick Thompson, a manufacturer of linen check and a well-known member of the Society of Friends, was born in Lanton Street, Penrith, Cumberland, on 28 August 1806. His father was then in prosperous circumstances, but the depression of trade caused by the War of 1812 brought about his failure. Young Thompson's aspirations to become an artist met with little sympathy from his family, and he was apprenticed to a house-painter; but he struggled with energy and perseverance against these adverse influences, and devoted all his leisure time to his favourite pursuit. He at length attracted the notice of Lord Lonsdale, and with his help he came in 1829 to London with an introduction to Sir Thomas Lawrence (1769–1830), and became a student at the British Museum and the Royal Academy.

=== Career ===
Thompson began to exhibit in 1824, when he had in the first exhibition of the Society of British Artists a "View in Cumberland," but he did not send a picture to the Royal Academy until 1832, in which year appeared "The Druids Cutting Down the Mistletoe". This was followed in 1833 by a picture containing full-length portraits of the daughters of the Hon. Colonel Lowther. His next exhibit was "Harvest Home in the Fourteenth Century," which appeared at the British Institution in 1837, and was presented by the artist to his patron, the Earl of Lonsdale. After this date he painted portraits, views of mansions, etc., but he did not exhibit again until 1847, when he sent to Westminster Hall "The Highland Ferry-Boat," which was engraved in line by James Tibbits Willmore. "The Proposal" appeared at the Royal Academy in 1848; "The Highland Bride," likewise engraved by Willmore, in 1851; "Going to Church: Scene in the Highlands," in 1852; "The Hope Beyond," in 1853; "The Course of true Love never did run smooth," in 1854; "The Mountain Ramblers," in 1855; "Sunny Hours of Childhood" and "Looking out for the Homeward Bound," in 1856; and "The Pet Lamb," in 1857. He painted in 1858 "Crossing a Highland Loch," which was engraved by Charles Mottram; but he did not again exhibit until 1860, when he sent to the Royal Academy "The Signal," which was engraved by Charles Cousen for the Art Journal of 1862. In 1864, he had at the academy "The Height of Ambition," engraved by Charles Cousen for the Art Journal, as was likewise by J. C. Armytage "Drawing the Net at Hawes Water," painted in 1867 for Lord Esher, but never exhibited. "Rush Bearing" and a view of Rydal Mount are among his best works.

=== Later years ===
In his later years, Thompson devoted himself chiefly to landscape subjects with figures, the themes of which were for the most part drawn from the mountains and lakes of Cumberland and Westmoreland, but occasionally from Scotland. His range, however, was limited, and his work was lacking in poetic sympathy. His attempts at classical and scriptural subjects, such as "Acis and Galatea," exhibited at the Royal Academy in 1849, and "Proserpine," were not a success. His last work was "Eldmuir, or Solitude."

Thompson was married twice; his first wife, Ann Parker Bidder, was a sister of George Parker Bidder, the celebrated calculating prodigy and civil engineer. Thompson and his first wife had one son. After his first wife died in 1844, Thompson remarried in 1850 to Elizabeth Varty. Thompson died at the Hermitage—a cottage on the estate of Lord Lonsdale—in Hackthorpe, Cumberland, where he had lived in retirement for upwards of 40 years, on 27 December 1879. He was buried in the churchyard at St. Michael's Church in Lowther.

=== Legacy ===
The Life and Works of Jacob Thompson (1882) by Llewellyn Jewitt includes a portrait of Thompson, drawn on wood by himself, and engraved by W. Ballingall, in the prefix.

In 1999, "The Highland Ferry-Boat" was sold at auction for £166,500 in Gleneagles, Scotland.

Penrith and Eden Museum has works by Thompson on display, including "The Druids Cutting Down the Mistletoe", which shows figures in a wooded clearing in the Eden Valley with the Bronze Age stone circle of Long Meg and Her Daughters, one of Eden’s iconic monuments and tourist destinations, clearly visible in the distance.

== Gallery ==
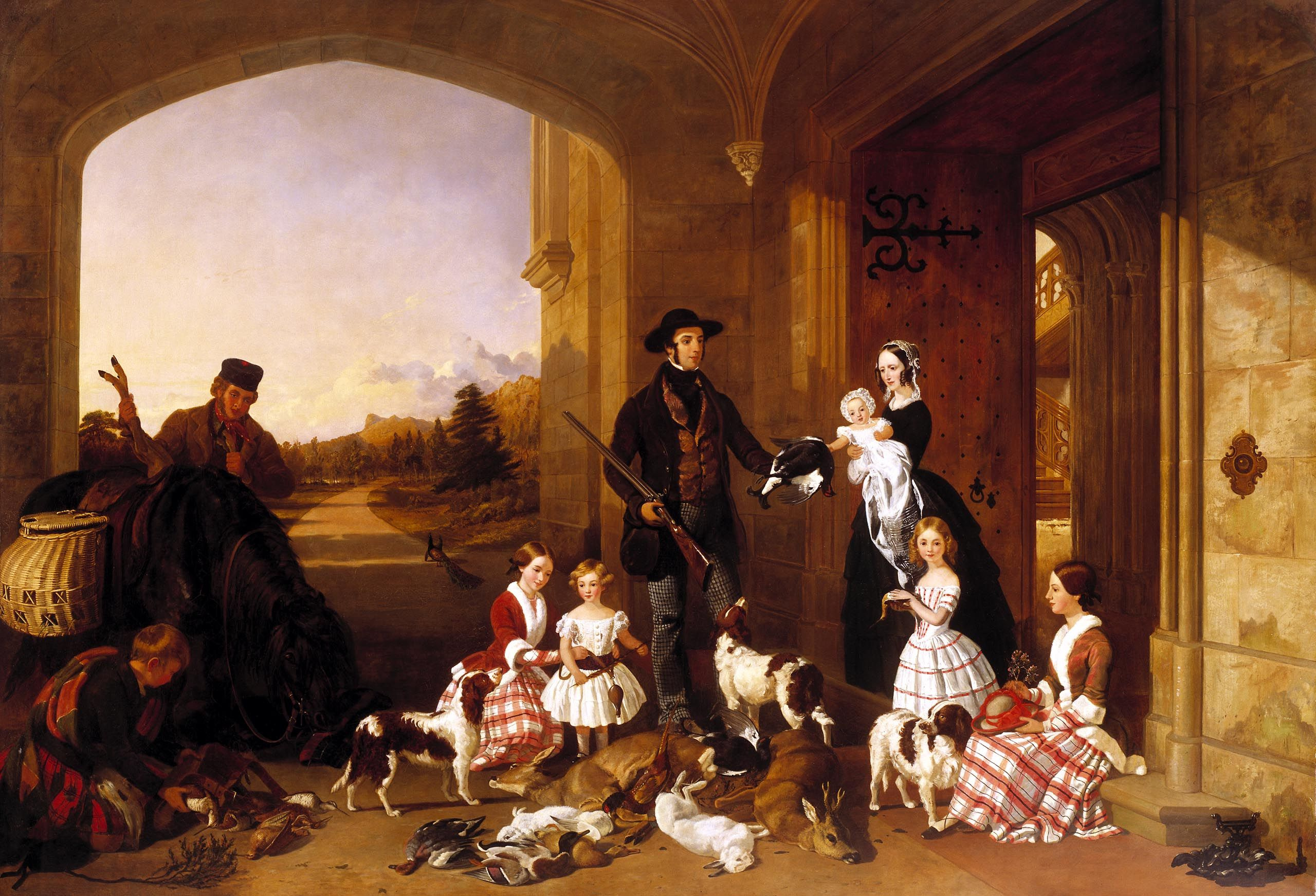
"The Day's Bag"

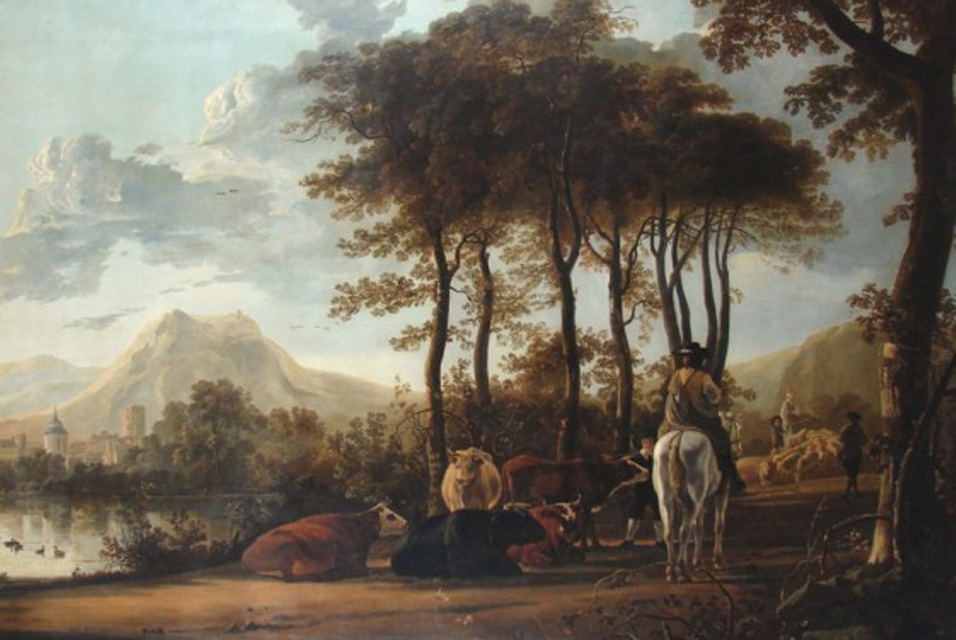
"River Landscape with Horsemen and Peasants"

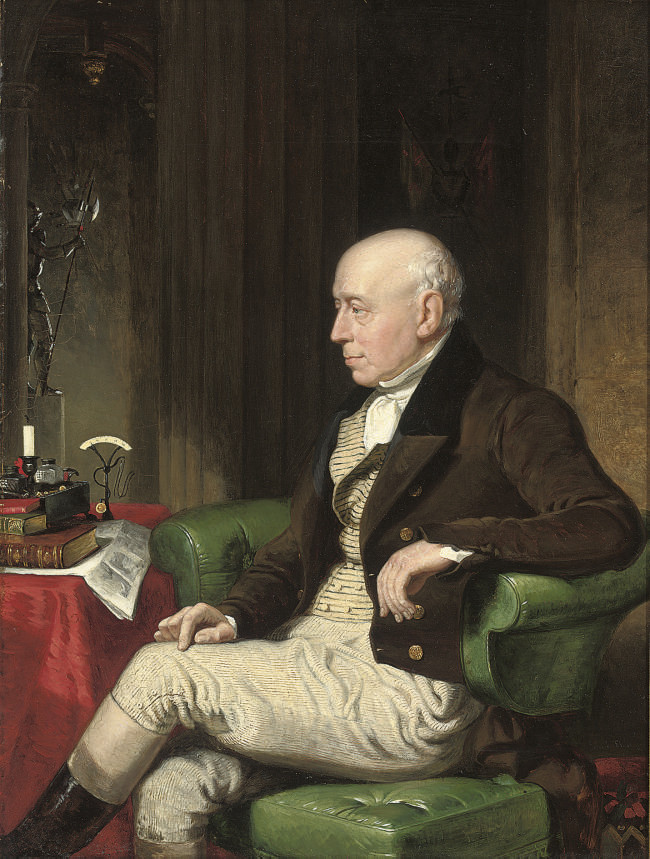
Portrait of William Lowther, 1st Earl of Lonsdale

== Sources ==
- Graves, Robert Edmund (1898). "Thompson, Jacob" . In Lee, Sidney (ed.). Dictionary of National Biography. Vol. 56. London: Smith, Elder & Co. "[Llewellyn Jewitt's Life and Works of Jacob Thompson, 1882 (cf. review by T. Hall Caine in Academy, 1882, ii. 16); Eldmuir, an Art-story of Scottish Home-life, Scenery, and Incident, by Jacob Thompson, junior, 1879; Art Journal, 1861 pp. 9–11, 1880, p. 107; Magazine of Art, iv. 32–5; Royal Academy Exhibition Catalogues, 1832–66.]"
