= Melkinthorpe =

Hamlet in Cumbria, England

Coordinates: 54.620°N 2.689°W

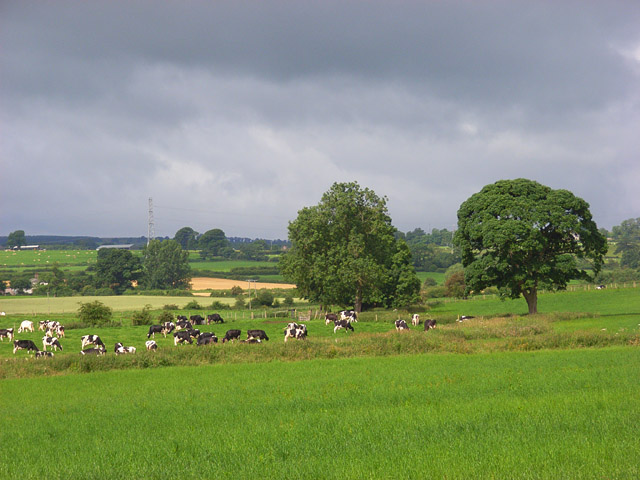
- Pastures, Melkinthorpe

- Location in Eden, Cumbria Location within Cumbria
- OS grid reference: NY555252
- Civil parish: Lowther
- Unitary authority: Westmorland and Furness
- Ceremonial county: Cumbria
- Region: North West
- Country: England
- Sovereign state: United Kingdom
- Post town: PENRITH
- Postcode district: CA10
- Dialling code: 01931
- Police: Cumbria
- Fire: Cumbria
- Ambulance: North West
- UK Parliament: Westmorland and Lonsdale

Melkinthorpe is a hamlet in the civil parish of Lowther, in the Westmorland and Furness district, in the county of Cumbria, England. It is near the villages of Hackthorpe and Cliburn. Circa 1870, it had a population of 99 as recorded in the Imperial Gazetteer of England and Wales.

== Geography and general description ==
Places of interest in the village include Larch Cottage nurseries in the hamlet and Red Barn Gallery. Nearby Abbot Lodge Jersey ice cream farm, is about half a mile away to the southwest, and Wetheriggs County Pottery, now re-located to County Durham, was about a mile away northwards. There is also a wood called Melkinthorpe Wood to the southeast. Melkinthorpe Hall, which was built in the 16th century, was demolished in the 19th century. The River Leith flows past the southern edge of the village.

== See also ==
- Listed buildings in Lowther, Cumbria
