= National nature reserves in Cumbria =

National nature reserves in England were established by English Nature, now Natural England, which manages them either directly or through non-governmental organisations such as the Royal Society for the Protection of Birds or the National Trust.

There are 25 national nature reserves in Cumbria, including the large Moor House-Upper Teesdale reserve which is shared with County Durham.

All national nature reserves include all or part of a named Site of Special Scientific Interest (SSSI). Moor House-Upper Teesdale is also a Biosphere reserve.

== Types of habitat ==
- Wetlands

A number of the reserves are bogs (often called "moss" in local dialect), a type of habit which the European Union is keen to protect. Bassenthwaite Lake, one of the largest lakes in the English Lake District, is a habitat for the Osprey.

- Limestone pavements

Whitbarrow and Park Wood are limestone habitats.

== List ==
- Bassenthwaite Lake
- Blelham Bog
- Borrowdale Rainforest
- Clawthorpe Fell
- Cliburn Moss
- Drumburgh Moss
- Duddon Mosses
- Finglandrigg Woods
- Gowk Bank
- Great Asby Scar
- Hallsenna Moor
- High Leys
- Moor House-Upper Teesdale
- North Fen
- North Walney
- Park Wood
- Roudsea Wood & Mosses
- Rusland Moss
- Sandscale Haws
- Sandybeck Meadow
- Smardale Gill
- South Solway Mosses(Bowness Common, Glasson Moss, Wedholme Flow SSSI's)
- Tarn Moss
- Thornhill Moss and Meadows
- Walton Moss
- Whitbarrow

== See also ==
- National nature reserves in England
- Natural England
