= Roanhead =

Headland in Cumbria, England

Coordinates: 54.1648°N 3.2415°W

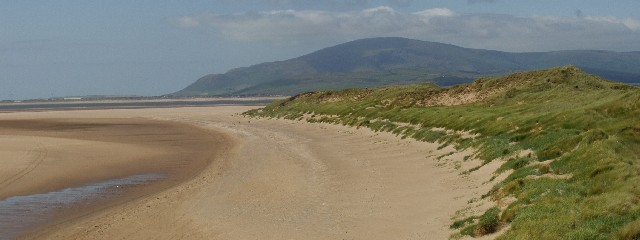
Roanhead with Black Combe visible in the distance

Roanhead (sometimes spelled Ronhead) refers to the limestone outcrop of Roanhead Crag in Cumbria and the farmland behind it, but in recent years the term has been taken to mean the sandy beaches adjoining Sandscale Haws extending to Snab Point. The Irish Sea lies to the west of Roanhead, whilst the Duddon Estuary and Walney Channel are due north and south respectively. The beach is noted for its abundance of sand dunes and strong, often dangerous coastal currents. Today the beach is a National Trust conservation area, and a two-mile stretch of the Cumbria Coastal Way runs through it.

== Ecological importance ==
The beach to both sides of Roanhead Crag is a breeding site for the rare natterjack toad, and the central point of a meta population of the species, which extends from Dunnerholme to Sandscale Haws. 25% of the UK's natterjack toad population resides here, and the area provides essential breeding habitat.

=== Species identified ===
The area around Roanhead is an important habitat for multiple species including 600 flowering plant species, most notably the rare bee orchid, coral root orchid, pyramidal orchid, marsh orchid, harebell, centaury, rest harrow, grass of parnassus, sea holly and thyme. Over 500 species of fungi can be found around Roanhead.

Lampyris noctiluca (glow worm) have recently been recorded in the area between Roanhead crag and Sandscale Haws NNR.

There are 3 species of newt: palmate newt, smooth newt, and great crested newt. Otters have been recorded on the beach at Roanhead. The site hosts 4500 overwintering wading birds. Black backed gulls, black headed gulls and herring gulls roost in the crags. Plover (Birds of Conservation Concern red list) and lapwing (red list) nest between Roanhead Crag and the shore. Between November and February common starling murmurations can be seen before the birds roost on the wet meadow at Sandscale Haws.

Other birds include: barn owl, kestrel (amber list), marsh harrier (amber list), sparrowhawk, oystercatcher (amber list), curlew (red list), dunlin (red list), knot (amber list) sanderling (amber list), grey heron, skylark (red list), meadow pipit (amber list), snipe (amber list), turnstone (amber list), redshank (amber list), reed bunting (amber list), sedge warbler (amber list), little egret, mallard, teal wigeon, scaup, long tailed duck, great crested grebe, goldeneye, shelduck (amber list).

The Northern Colletes bee occurs at Roanhead. The species is a UK Biodiversity Action Plan species.

Bats recorded at Roanhead to date include Pipistrelle Bat, Soprano Pipistrelle Bat, Noctule Bat, Brown Long Eared Bat, Whiskered Bat, Natterers Bat and Daubentons Bat. (Last recorded 2022.)

== Protections ==
Roanhead is included in the Duddon Estuary Site of Special Scientific Interest, Duddon Estuary Ramsar Site, Morecambe Bay Special Area of Conservation and the Morecambe Bay & Duddon Estuary Special Protection Area. The site also includes an area of Ancient Woodland. Adjacent to Roanhead is Sandscale Haws, a National Nature Reserve.

== Mining ==
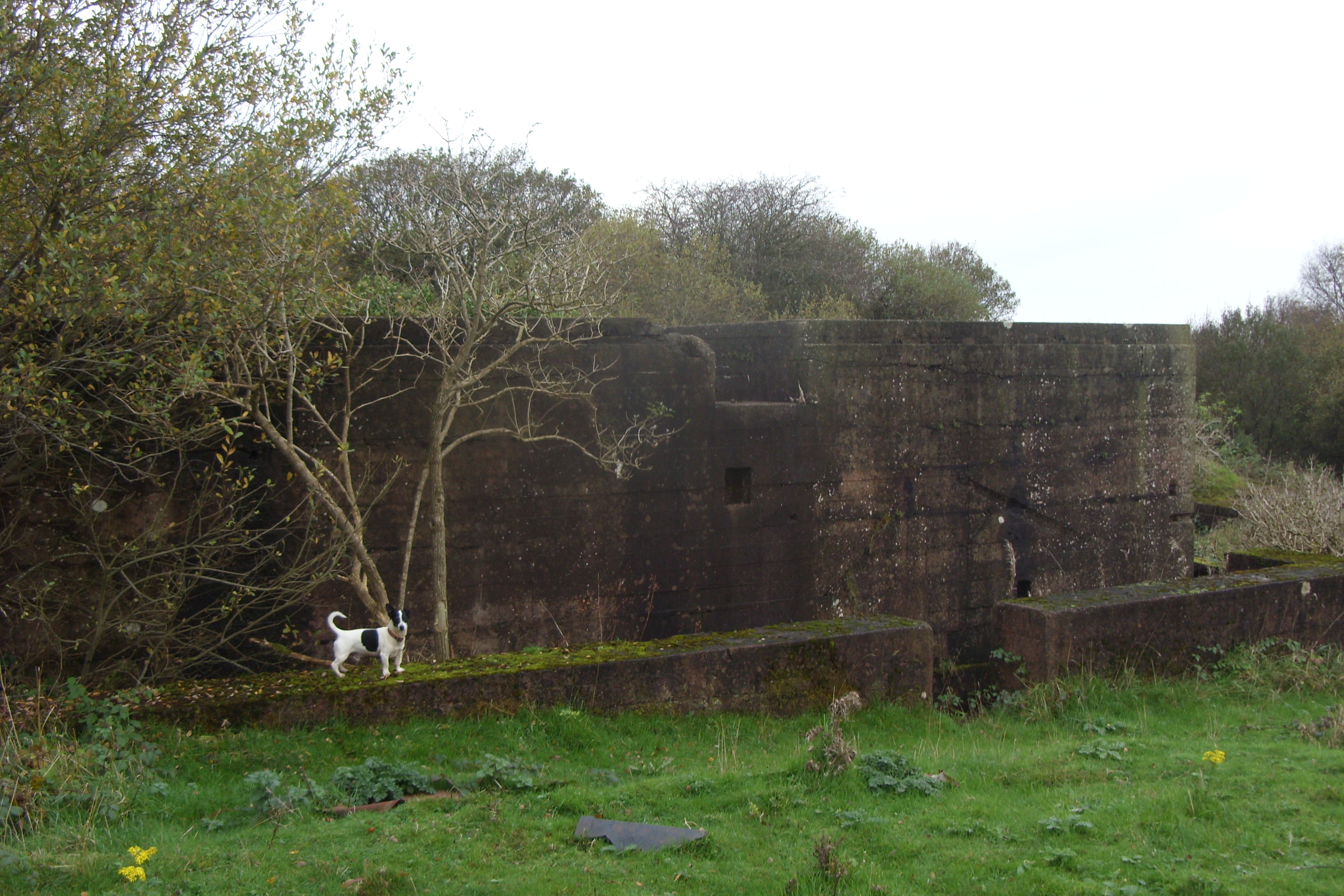
Base of a Hathorn Davey engine at Violet pit, Roanhead

There are signs of shotholes on Roanhead Crag, indicating that, like Dunnerholme, it has been quarried for limestone at some time. There is a small limekiln near the National Trust depot, one of two on the estate.

Myles Kennedy leased the mining rights from Thomas Sandys in 1852. There may have been an earlier takenote but there is no sign of mining on the Roanhead estate on the 1850 OS map. The firm of Kennedy Brothers worked the iron mines until the last of the ore was taken from Nigel pit in July 1942 The Nigel mine alone is said to have produced 11 million tons of ore. It was one of several deposits on the estate. The farmhouse was moved to its present site shortly after the discovery of the Nigel deposit in 1902.

The mines left a series of subsidence craters which are now flooded. Along with the ponds left by Park mines, they are currently managed as fishing ponds by Furness Fishing Association.

The mining system at Roanhead was top-slicing, which consists in the working of an orebody in horizontal slices, beginning at the top. Levels, for haulage, are established at proper intervals and, from these, raises are put up to the top of the orebody about every 50 ft. Starting at the tops of these raises drifts are run out and then, retreating toward the raise, the slice is worked back by breast stoping. The overburden or capping lying above the ore is supported on square sets or posts until a slice, or part of a slice, has been worked. The floor of the slice is then covered with slabs or plank and the supporting timbers are shot out and the capping is allowed to cave on to the timber floor.

== Development ==
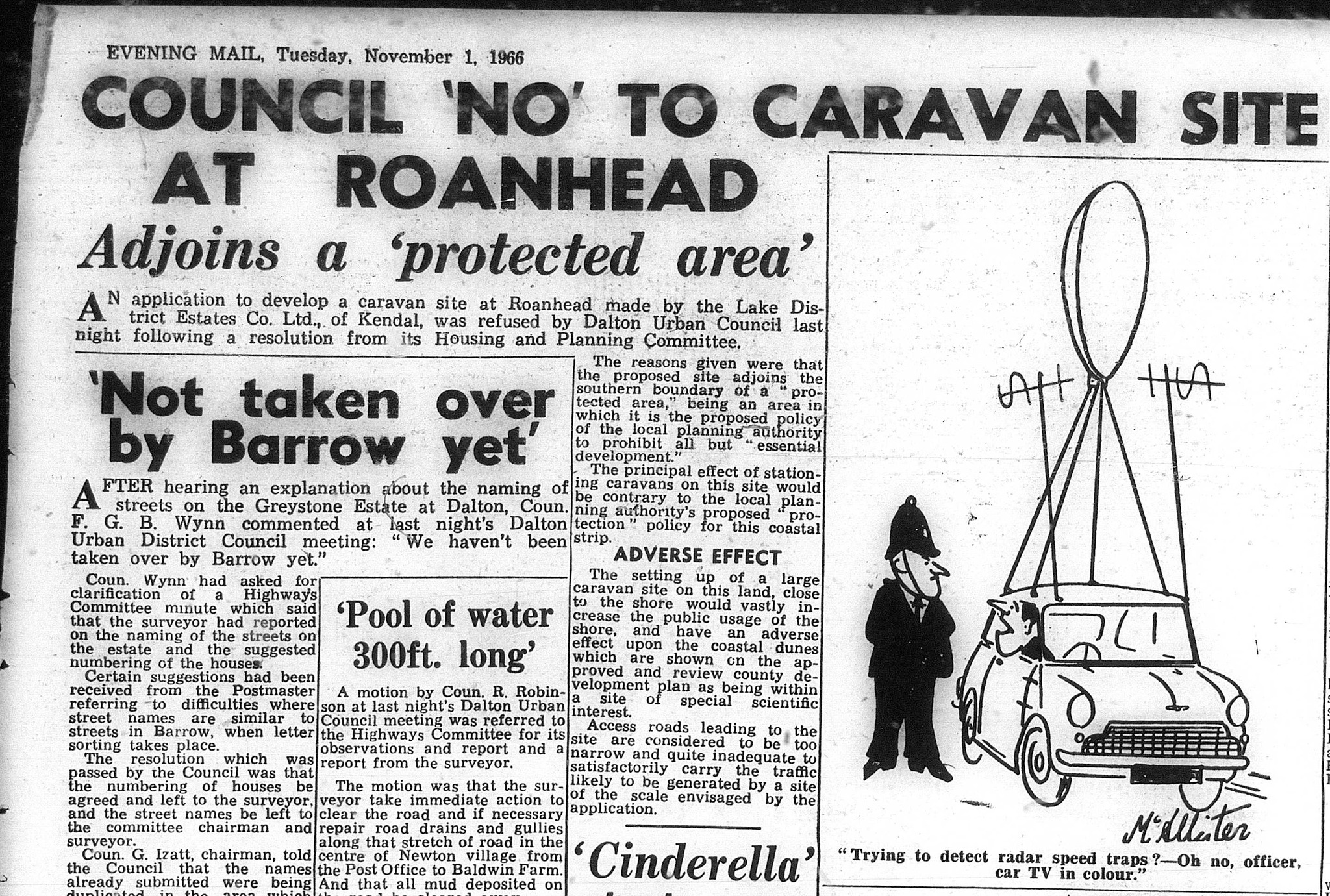
Evening Mail report on an unsuccessful planning application for a caravan park at Roanhead, dated November 1966

In 2025 a controversial holiday park application for Roanhead was refused by Westmorland & Furness Council on legal grounds relating to protected sites and habitats. The council's ruling concluded the development would have a significant effect on the adjacent SSSI, RAMSAR Site, SAC, SPA, Ancient Woodland and National Nature Reserve, and this could not be mitigated for.

Several applications for smaller holiday parks on neighbouring land were also withdrawn after strong opposition from conservation agencies including the RSPB, National Trust, Cumbria Wildlife Trust, Friends of the Lake District, Wildfowl & Wetland Trust, Amphibian & Reptile Conservation Trust, Butterfly Conservation, and many more.

In 1966 the Housing and Planning Committee of Dalton Urban Council refused a planning application from Lake District Estates on grounds that the land at Roanhead borders a protected area. "The setting up of a large caravan site on this land, close to the shore would vastly increase the public usage of the shore, and have an adverse effect upon the coastal dunes which are shown on the approved and review county development plan as being within a site of special scientific interest.

"Access roads leading to the site are considered to be too narrow and quite inadequate to satisfactorily carry the traffic likely to be generated by a site of the scale envisaged by the application."

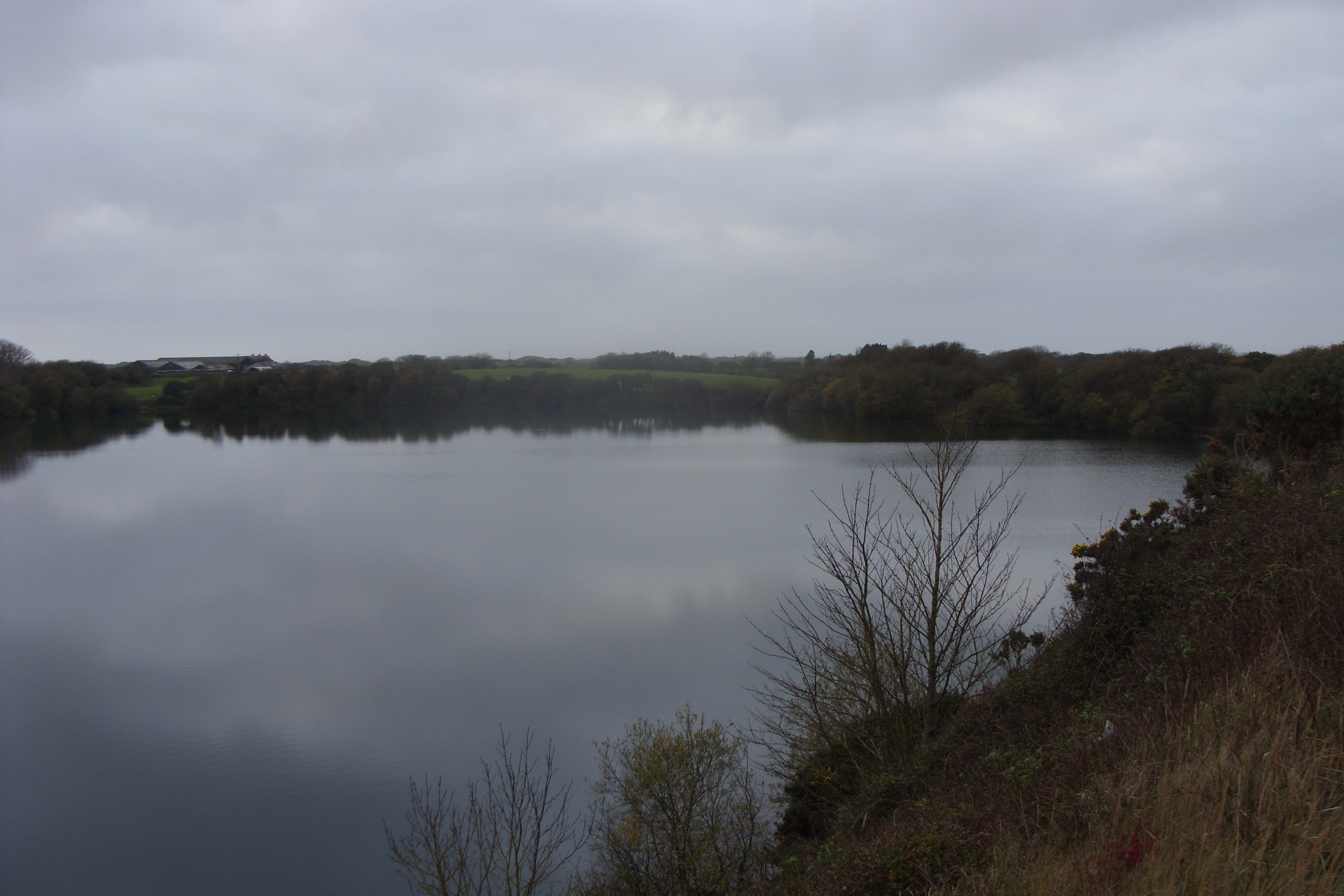
Rita pond is home to some very large carp

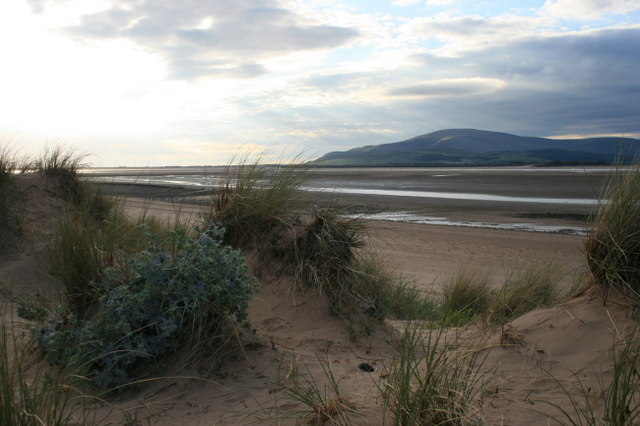
Sand dune at Roanhead

== See also ==
- List of beaches
