= River Leith =

River in Cumbria, England

Coordinates: 54.6143°N 2.6196°W

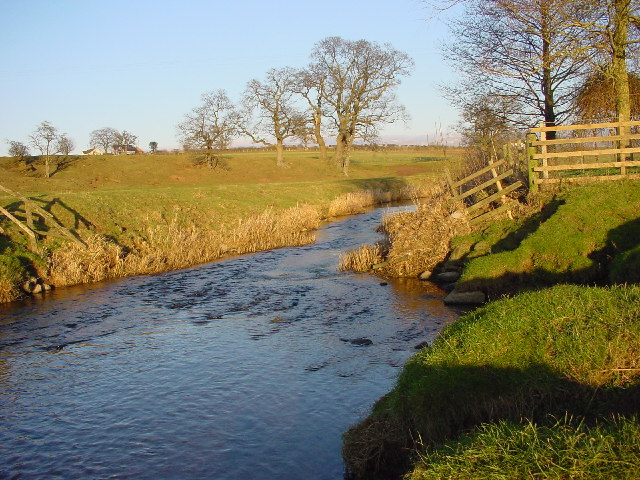
River Leith near Cliburn

The River Leith is a watercourse in Cumbria, a county of northwestern England.

Rising at Shap, the Leith flows north alongside the M6 motorway via Great and Little Strickland before turning eastward at Melkinthorpe. Having passed through Cliburn, the Leith flows into the River Lyvennet at Cliburn Mill.
