= Thomas Sandys (Conservative politician) =

British politician

Sandys in 1895

Colonel Thomas Myles Sandys (12 May 1837 – 18 October 1911) was a British army officer and Conservative Party politician who sat in the House of Commons from 1885 to 1911.

He was born in Blackheath, London, and was the only son of Captain Thomas Sandys of the Royal Navy. Following his education at Shrewsbury School, he was commissioned as an officer in the 73rd Bengal Native Infantry, a military unit of the Honourable East India Company. After fighting in the Indian Rebellion of 1857 he exchanged into the 7th (or Royal Fusiliers) Regiment of Foot, part of the regular British Army. He was to serve in the 7th Foot for twenty years, retiring with the rank of captain.

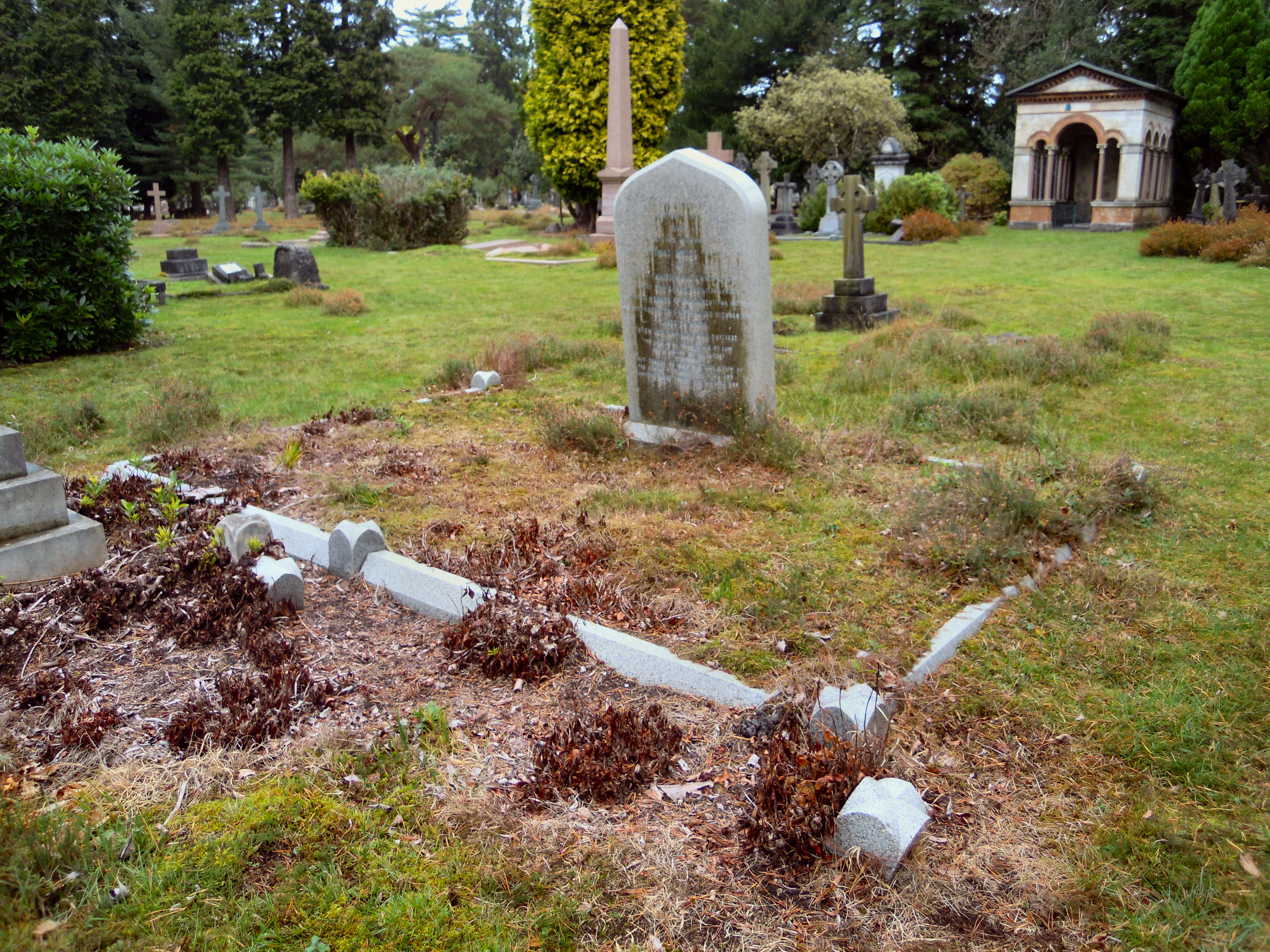
Sandys' grave in Brookwood Cemetery

He moved to the family's ancestral home, Graythwaite Hall, near Ulverston which was then in Lancashire. He had the gardens remodelled by Thomas Hayton Mawson. He continued his association with the armed forces as honorary colonel of the 3rd (Militia) Battalion of the Loyal North Lancashire Regiment, a position he held until 1897, and as honorary colonel of the 1st Volunteer Battalion of the regiment from April 1902. He was a staunch Protestant, becoming Grand Master of the Loyal Orange Lodge of England and was a deputy lieutenant for the County of Lancashire.

In 1852 he leased the mining rights of his land at Roanhead to the Kennedy Brothers. The mines were among the most productive in the area and were worked until 1942.

The Redistribution of Seats Act 1885 created the new constituency of Bootle, and Sandys was elected as the first Member of Parliament for the seat. He retained the seat at subsequent elections, several times being elected unopposed. He resigned his seat in March 1911. He died later that year, at his London home at 87 Jermyn Street, aged 74.

He is buried at Brookwood Cemetery, Surrey.

Parliament of the United Kingdom
New constituency	Member of Parliament for Bootle; 1885–1911	Succeeded by Bonar Law
