= Myles Burton Kennedy =

English ironmaster (1862–1928)

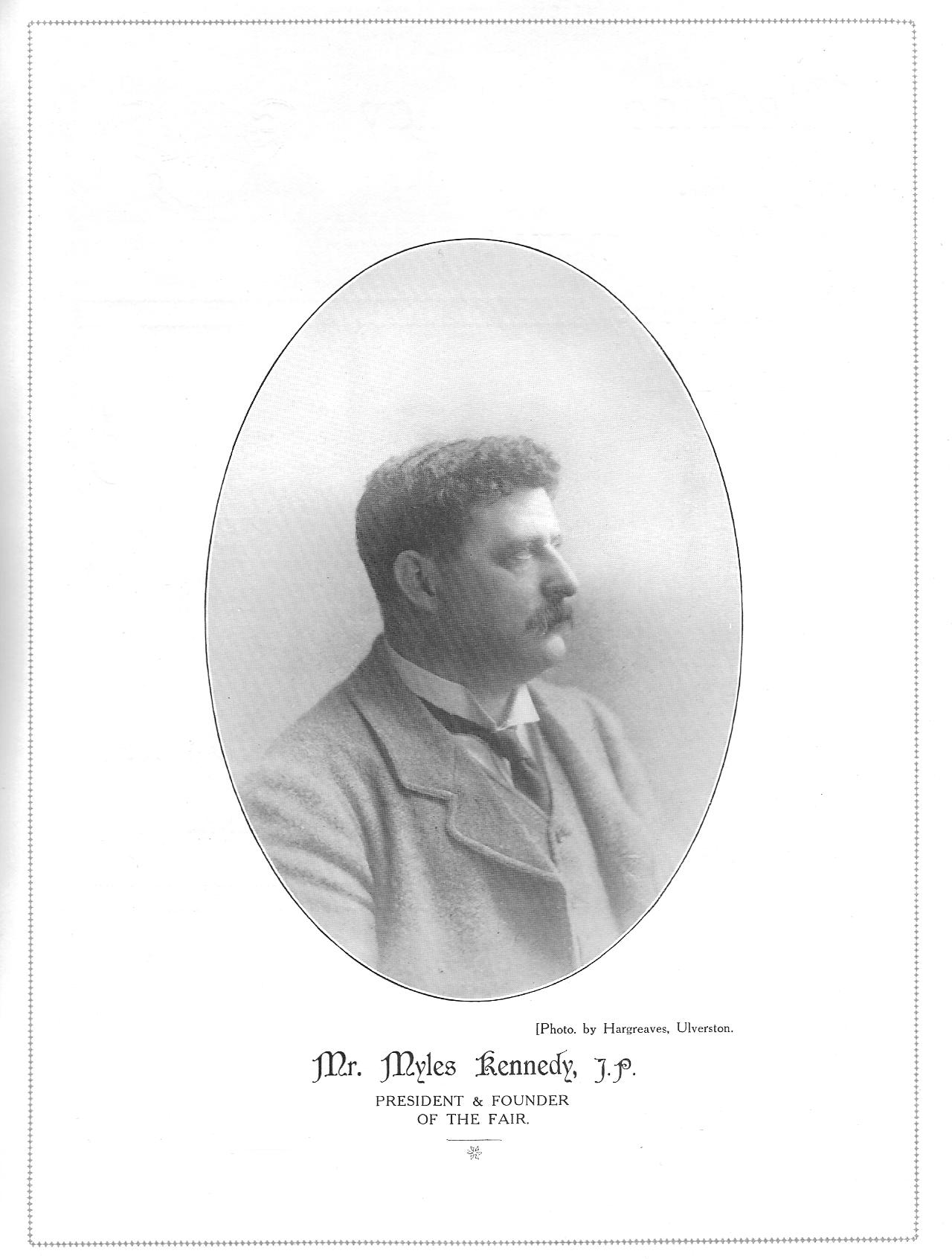
Myles Burton Kennedy (photo by Hargreaves, Ulverston)

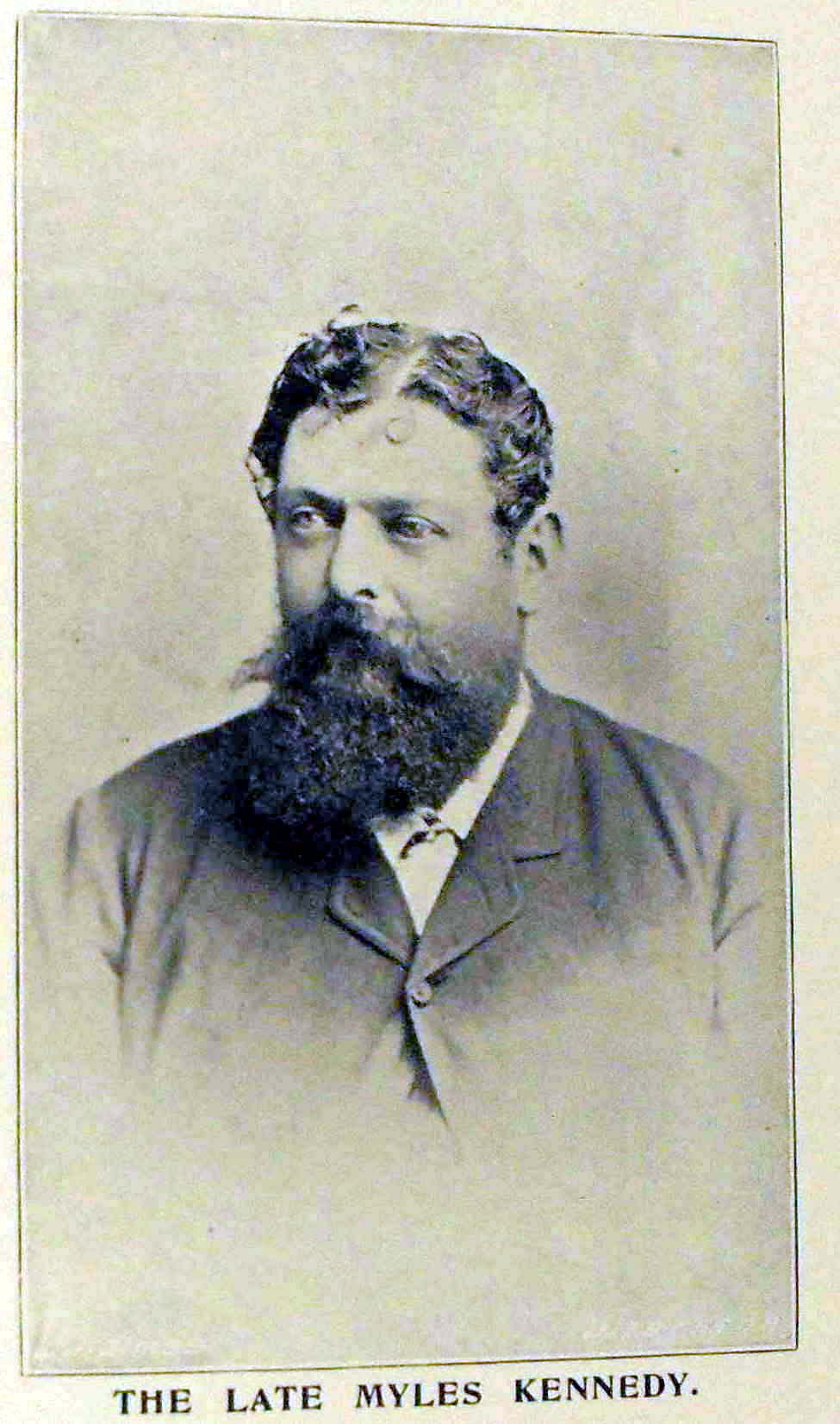
Myles Kennedy Sr, first chairman of North Lonsdale Iron & Steel Co

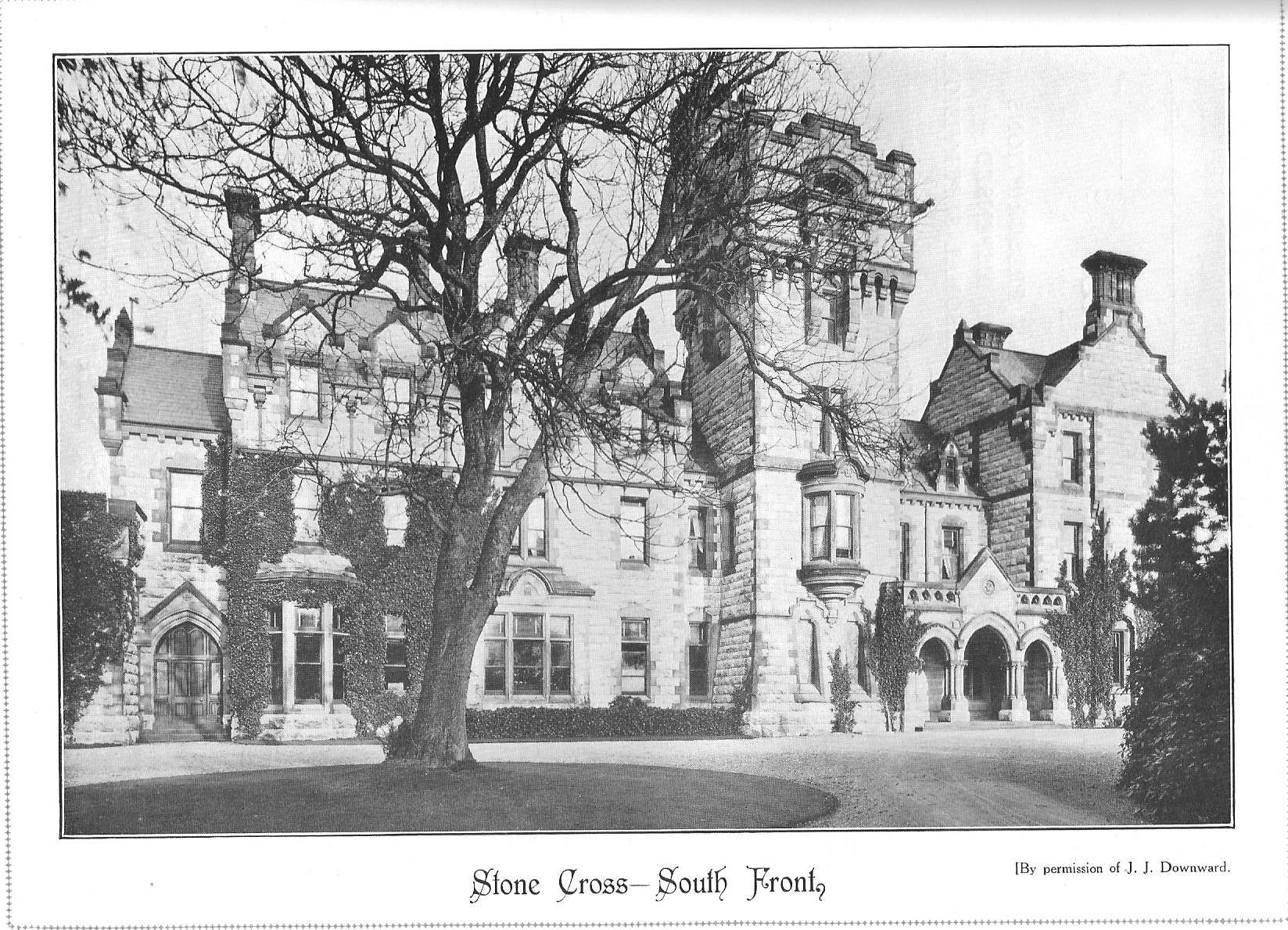
Stone Cross Mansion

Myles Burton Kennedy (1862–1928) was a Furness ironmaster, the proprietor of Roanhead mines, and chairman of the North Lonsdale Iron & Steel Company.

== Parentage ==
Myles B. Kennedy's grandfather was Charles Storr Kennedy who, with Henry Kennedy of Brighton, held 4 X 1/18th shares in the Ulverston Mining Company when it was established in 1838. C. S. Kennedy's shares were sold to Alexander Brogden before 1857. By then he had taken leases on Green Haume, Mackinon and Roanhead mines. Greenhaume was soon exhausted and the Askham mine was lost in the legal dispute, Wakefield v. Buccleuch, but Roanhead was a winner.

The first Myles Kenedy was born at Fair View in 1835. He was educated at the Royal School of Mines. He married Margaret Rowley in 1861 and had 15 children. He was also a captain in the volunteer corps.

Charles Storr Kennedy died in 1857 and his sons Charles Burton and Myles carried on the business as "Kennedy Brothers". C. B. Kennedy died in 1865. His brother commissioned Stone Cross in 1874 and was made vice chairman of the North Lonsdale Ironworks Co at its inauguration in 1873. He died in 1883.

== Career ==
On the death of his father, Myles Burton inherited a controlling interest in the firm of Kennedy Brothers. He was appointed to the board of the North Lonsdale ironworks in 1889 and later became chairman. He also became chairman of the Whitehaven Haematite Iron Co. He was managing owner of the steam ketch "Harvest" from 1890. On his death he was succeeded as proprietor of Roanhead mines by his son, Nigel.

== Other interests ==
In his youth he played football and cricket for Ulverston, and was vice president of the hound trail association at its inauguration. As Wor Bro. Myles Kennedy, PM, PPCV, he laid the foundation stone of Ulverston masonic lodge on 31 October 1905. He was a JP and opened Ulverston Coronation Hall in 1904. He was a commander in the volunteer corps and managed a shooting range at Sandscale Haws. He served as High Sheriff of Lancashire.
