= Listed buildings in Cliburn, Cumbria =

Cliburn is a civil parish in Westmorland and Furness, Cumbria, England. It contains seven listed buildings that are recorded in the National Heritage List for England. All the listed buildings are designated at Grade II, the lowest of the three grades, which is applied to "buildings of national importance and special interest". The parish contains the village of Cliburn, and is otherwise rural. The listed buildings comprise a church, a bridge, and a farmhouse with associated structures.

== Buildings ==
| Name and location | Photograph | Date | Notes |
|---|---|---|---|
| St Cuthbert's Church; 54.61389°N 2.63997°W | | 12th century | The church was extensively restored and altered in 1886–87 when a south aisle and a porch were added. It is in stone, the main body of the church has a slate roof with stone copings, and the aisle has a lead roof. The church consists of a nave, a south aisle, and a short chancel. On the west gable is a bellcote surmounted by an iron cross. The south doorway and a window on the north side of the chancel are Norman. The doorway has a lintel flanked by small carved figures, and above it is a blank tympanum and a zigzag arch. |
| Cliburn Mill bridge 54.61549°N 2.62051°W | | 1827 | The bridge carries a road over the River Lyvennet. It is in sandstone, and consists of three segmental arches, with two cutwaters that have angled tops. The parapets have chamfered copings, and three rusticated pillars that have square caps with grooved sides and domed tops. On the bridge are concentric string courses, and a datestone in a circular panel. |
| Rectory Farmhouse and adjoining buildings 54.62295°N 2.64322°W | | Mid to late 19th century | The farmhouse is in stuccoed sandstone on a plinth, with corner pilasters, and a roof mainly of Welsh slate with some stone copings. It has two storeys with cellars, and an irregular plan. Some gables have pediments. The doors and windows, which are sashes all have stone surrounds. There is a bay window on the south front, and a pair of round-headed stair windows. Attached to the house is a range of single-storey outbuildings. |
| Coach house, Rectory Farm; 54.62329°N 2.64327°W | — | Late 19th century | The coach house is in stone and has a slate roof with stone copings and ball finials. There are two storeys and five bays. It contains doors, windows, loft doors, and a carriage entrance with a segmental head; all the openings have stone surrounds. |
| Dog kennels, Rectory Farm; 54.62319°N 2.64285°W | — | Late 19th century | There are two separate runs, each with a stone kennel that has a Welsh slate roof. Around the runs are low walls with iron railings. |
| Garden walls, Rectory Farm; 54.62322°N 2.64394°W | — | Late 19th century | The walls surround a walled garden to the north of the farmhouse. They are in stone, and have openings on the south and east sides. |
| Stables, Rectory Farm; 54.62334°N 2.64301°W | — | Late 19th century | The stables and tack room are in stone and have a slate roof with stone copings and ball finials. There are two storeys and five bays. In the ground floor are three doors and two windows, and in the upper storey is a loft door and a window. |
