= Whale, Cumbria =

Hamlet in Cumbria, England

Coordinates: 54.586°N 2.741°W

Whale
- Hamlet
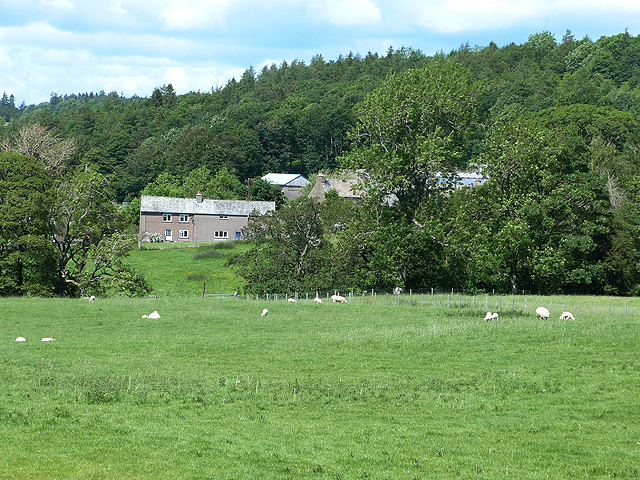
- Whale

- Location in the former Eden District Location within Cumbria
- OS grid reference: NY520215
- Civil parish: Lowther
- Unitary authority: Westmorland and Furness
- Ceremonial county: Cumbria
- Region: North West
- Country: England
- Sovereign state: United Kingdom
- Post town: PENRITH
- Postcode district: CA10
- Dialling code: 01931
- Police: Cumbria
- Fire: Cumbria
- Ambulance: North West
- UK Parliament: Westmorland and Lonsdale

Whale is a hamlet in the Westmorland and Furness unitary authority area, Cumbria, England. Historically in Westmorland, it is about a mile south of the village of Askham. In the Imperial Gazetteer of England and Wales of 1870-72 it had a population of 53.

== Toponymy ==
The name Whale comes from the same Anglo-Saxon language root as the country Wales, meaning 'foreigners'. It was given by the Angles of Helton to the Celtic inhabitants of the opposite side of the River Lowther, c. the 9th century.

== See also ==
- Listed buildings in Lowther, Cumbria
