= Sandscale Haws =

Nature reserve in Cumbria, England

Coordinates: 54.164228°N 3.257402°W

- IUCN category IV (habitat/species management area)
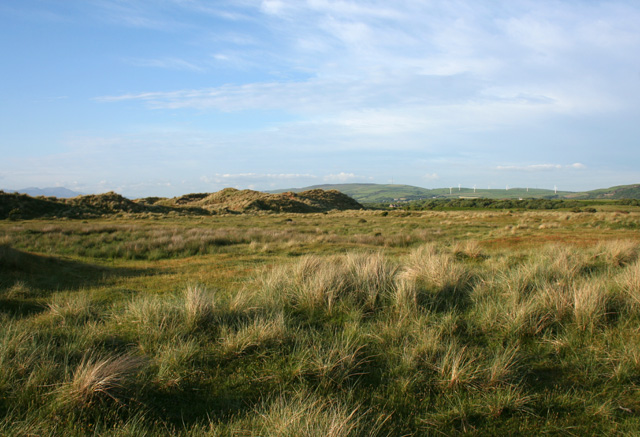
- Sand dunes at Sandscale Haws
- Interactive map of Sandscale Haws
- Area: 282 ha (700 acres)

Sandscale Haws is a national nature reserve on the Duddon Estuary, Cumbria, England. It is managed by the National Trust. Resident species include the natterjack toad.

== Industrial history ==
Sandscale brick and tile works appears on the 1850 Ordnance Survey map.

The Sandscale Mining Company was formed in 1877 by members of the Millom & Askham Company. The lease was signed by the then landowner Thomas Woodburne. Thomas Woodburne also built Sandscale cottages in 1882, which were rented to the mine captains.

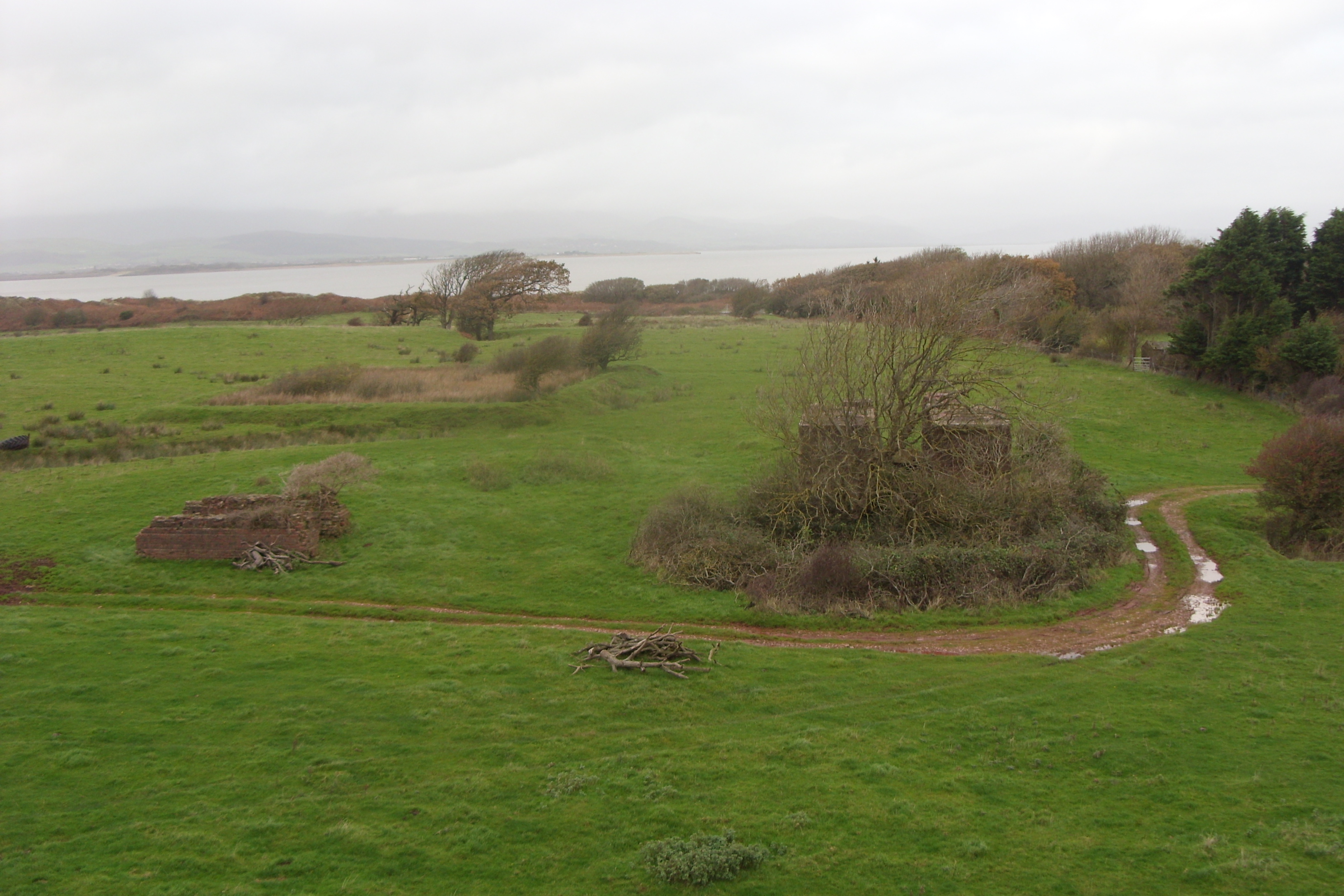
Sandscale No1 pit. A large sandstone winding engine bed can be seen behind the trees. A brick winding engine bed is to the left and the cooling pond behind.

The mines were taken over by Kennedy Brothers in 1893 and worked until 1905 but the pumps were kept running at Sandscale No2 to assist at Roanhead. The steam pumping engine was replaced by an electric pump in 1928. The headgear was removed and the shaft covered in 1937.

Myles Burton Kennedy trained the local yeomanry here, the range can be seen on the 1905 OS map. During the war, the dunes were used as a decoy site and several brick structures remain from this period.

In 1954 the estate was bought by British Cellophane who built the present farmhouse and demolished the old one. Shortly before BCL Barrow was closed, the present nature reserve was sold to the National Trust by Courtaulds.

== Ecology ==
The reserve's sand dunes support a population of natterjack toads (Bufo calamita). The species, which is nationally rare in Britain, is adapted to breed in ephemeral waterbodies. Another amphibian present is the great crested newt (Triturus cristatus).

=== Mycology ===
Sandscale Haws is a nationally important site for rare and specialist fungi.

A 2014-15 report by the North West Fungus Group for the National Trust emphasises the mycological significance of the reserve.

The report was authored by Dr Irene Ridge, a former senior lecturer in biology at the Open University and, in summary, indicates that the site has yielded:

- 1 species completely new to science

- 15 species that have featured in Red Data Lists of threatened species

- 27 more species that are rare according to the FRDBI (Fungal Records Database of Britain and Ireland).

In particular, one threatened species present, Wintergreen rust, had prompted a visit by mycologists from Kew Gardens as part of their Lost and Found Project, which sought to locate species that might have become extinct. The site has attracted visits by the British Mycological Society and international mycologists because of its significance. It is, to quote Dr Ridge, "a site of considerable importance for fungi in the UK".

=== Protection ===
Sandscale Haws was formerly a separate Site of Special Scientific Interest, but in 1990 it was amalgamated with other SSSIs to form the Duddon Estuary SSSI. It is also protected under the European Union´s Directives relating to wildlife and nature conservation.

- The Duddon Estuary is a Special Protection Area under the Birds Directive. Sandscale Haws provides high tide roosts for waders and wildfowl.
- Sandscale Haws is included in the Morecambe Bay Special Area of Conservation under the Habitats Directive

== Facilities ==
There is a car park from with access by boardwalk to the beach and to the pools used by amphibians.

== See also ==
+ National nature reserves in Cumbria
