= Cliburn, Cumbria =

Village and civil parish in Cumbria, England

Cliburn
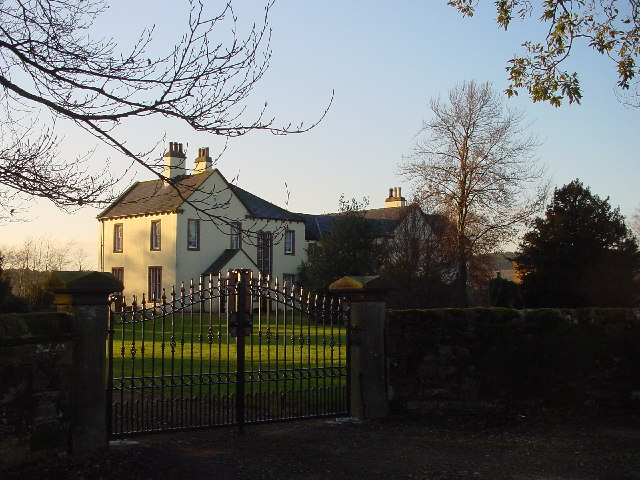
- The Old Rectory

- Location in Eden, Cumbria Location within Cumbria
- Population: 274 (2011)
- OS grid reference: NY5824
- Civil parish: Cliburn
- Unitary authority: Westmorland and Furness
- Ceremonial county: Cumbria
- Region: North West
- Country: England
- Sovereign state: United Kingdom
- Post town: PENRITH
- Postcode district: CA10
- Dialling code: 01931
- Police: Cumbria
- Fire: Cumbria
- Ambulance: North West
- UK Parliament: Westmorland and Lonsdale

Cliburn is a village and civil parish in the Westmorland and Furness Unitary Authority of Cumbria, England; the civil parish includes the hamlet of Town Head. At the 2001 census, the population was 204; this increased to 274 by 2011.

== Toponymy ==
The name Cliburn comes from clay and burn "clay stream", also interpreted as "Stream by the bank". Cliburn has been known as Cleburn or Cleyburn.

== Geography ==
The River Leith runs through the village south of the road. Cliburn was historically in Westmorland.

== Buildings ==
=== Cliburn Hall ===
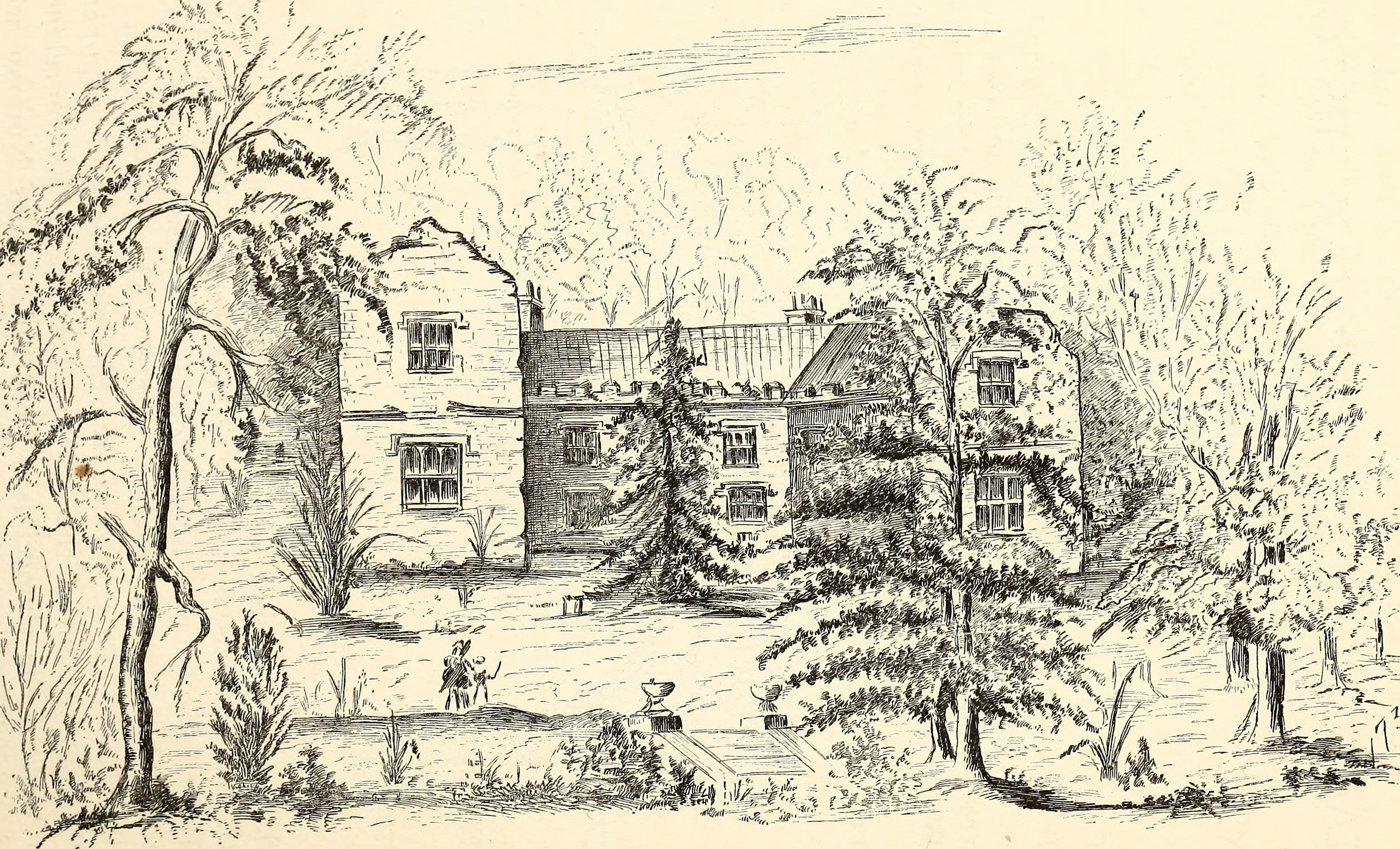
Cleburne Hall

Cliburn Hall is a three-storey Pele tower, built in 1387 by Robert de Cliburn. (Note: Cliburn Hall, Cliburn, Cumbria 54.614292°N 2.637624°W) Alterations and additions were made in 1567 by Richard Cliburn. In 1872, the tower was decastellated and given a gabled roof. Originally, there was an additional square tower at the south side of the building.

A stone inscription from the building reads:

Richard Cleburn this they me called
In which my time hath built this Hall
A.D. 1567

=== St Cuthbert's Church ===
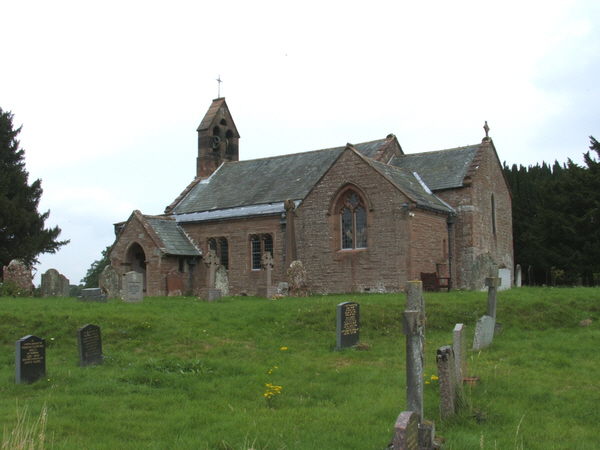
St Cuthbert's (Note: St Cuthbert's church, Cliburn, Cumbria 54.613859°N 2.639995°W)

The nave and chancel of St Cuthbert's Church date from the 12th century and the church is a Grade II listed building. The church was restored in the 19th century, with all windows bar one dating from that period.

The rectory lies between the village and former railway station.

== Other features ==
Cliburn Bridge is located at the south of the village, over the River Leith on the road to Morland. Cliburn Mill Bridge lies to the east at the confluence of the Leith and the River Lyvennet on the road to Bolton. Both are made of local red sandstone and were built after 1822, when a powerful flood destroyed the earlier bridges.

Cliburn Moss is a national nature reserve, sited to the north-west of the village.

A school was endowed in 1807 and the schoolhouse was rebuilt in 1877.

The village pub was called the Railway Inn; after the station closed, the name was changed to the Golden Pheasant Inn. It has since closed.

Whinfell Forest is a large wood sited to the north-west of the village and is the location of a Centre Parcs UK holiday park.

== Transport ==
Cliburn village is situated at crossroads on the east–west running C3047 (minor road), between Bolton and Penrith, and a north–south road connecting Morland in the south to the A66(T).

Cliburn railway station was a stop on the Eden Valley railway line, sited 0.6 miles (1 km) north of the village. After closure in 1956, the station house became a private residence; the signal box also survives and has been restored as a holiday cottage.

== See also ==
- Listed buildings in Cliburn, Cumbria
