= Lowther, Cumbria =

Civil parish in Cumbria, England

Coordinates: 54.5969°N 2.7314°W

Lowther
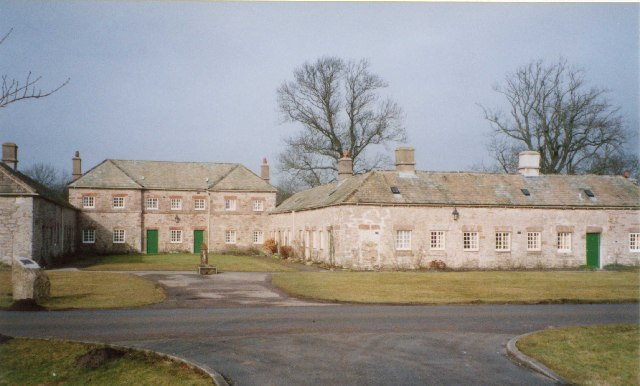
- Lowther Model Village

- Location within Cumbria
- Population: 465 (2011)
- OS grid reference: NY5323
- Civil parish: Lowther
- Unitary authority: Westmorland and Furness
- Ceremonial county: Cumbria
- Region: North West
- Country: England
- Sovereign state: United Kingdom
- Post town: PENRITH
- Postcode district: CA10
- Dialling code: 01931
- Police: Cumbria
- Fire: Cumbria
- Ambulance: North West
- UK Parliament: Westmorland and Lonsdale

Lowther is a civil parish in Westmorland and Furness, Cumbria. Within the parish are the settlements of Lowther Village, Newtown or Lowther Newtown, Hackthorpe, Whale, and Melkinthorpe. It was located in the historic county of Westmorland. At the 2001 census the parish had a population of 402, increasing to 465 at the 2011 Census.

The parish council meets at the Lowther Parish Hall in Hackthorpe. Lowther Endowed Primary School is also at Hackthorpe.

Most of the land in the parish belongs to the Lowther family estates. The family seat of the Lowthers was formerly Lowther Castle which is now a ruin but set in spectacular parkland.

Hackthorpe once had its own magistrates' court which is now part of the village's pub.

A large part of the parish is within the Lake District National Park.

== See also ==
- Listed buildings in Lowther, Cumbria
