= Cliburn Moss =

Nature reserve in Cumbria, England

Coordinates: 54.6238°N 2.6566°W

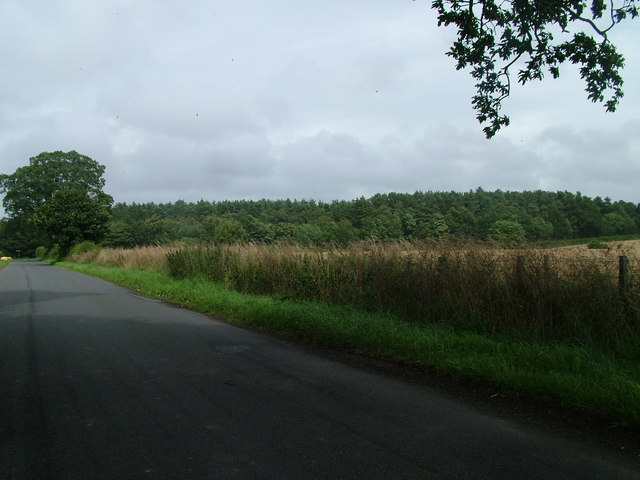

Cliburn Moss is a national nature reserve located northwest of the village of Cliburn, in the county of Cumbria, England (NY577256). It contains wetland habitats, produced by a hollow in the glacial valley. It is designated as a Site of Special Scientific Interest.

The 26 ha site was designated as a national nature reserve in 1996. Prior to becoming a protected area, it was affected by the human activities of peat cutting and drainage. The reserve is managed with the aims of restoring areas of fen, heath and mire and controlling the spread of trees.
