= Hackthorpe =

Hamlet in Cumbria, England

Coordinates: 54.600°N 2.706°W

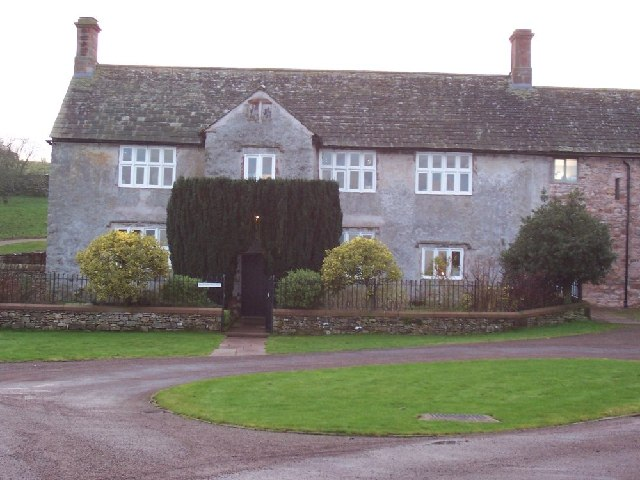
- Hackthorpe Hall

- Location in Eden, Cumbria Location within Cumbria
- OS grid reference: NY543230
- Civil parish: Lowther
- Unitary authority: Westmorland and Furness
- Ceremonial county: Cumbria
- Region: North West
- Country: England
- Sovereign state: United Kingdom
- Post town: PENRITH
- Postcode district: CA10
- Dialling code: 01931
- Police: Cumbria
- Fire: Cumbria
- Ambulance: North West
- UK Parliament: Westmorland and Lonsdale

Hackthorpe is a hamlet in Westmorland and Furness, in the county of Cumbria, England. Circa 1870, it had a population of 110 as recorded in the Imperial Gazetteer of England and Wales.

== Location ==
It is located on the A6 road just south of Lowther which the two settlements could be considered to be conjoined, and about four miles from the town of Penrith. It is close to the M6 motorway, but there is no direct access to Hackthorpe from the M6.

== Notable people ==
- Jacob Thompson (painter) (1806–1879) Born and raised in Penrith, worked in London, retired to Hackthorpe where he lived in a cottage (the Hermitage) on Lord Lonsdale's estate for c.40 years.

== See also ==
- Listed buildings in Lowther, Cumbria

== Sources ==
- Mullett, Michael A. (2020). A New history of Penrith: book V: Penrith in the nineteenth century, 1800-1901: chapters on the Victorian town. Carlisle: Bookcase. pp. 1–402. ISBN 9781912181346.
