= Listed buildings in Lowther, Cumbria =

Lowther is a civil parish in Westmorland and Furness, Cumbria, England. It contains 42 listed buildings that are recorded in the National Heritage List for England. Of these, 13 are listed at Grade II*, the middle of the three grades, and the others are at Grade II, the lowest grade. The parish contains the villages of Lowther, Newtown, Hackthorpe, Melkinthorpe, and Whale. The largest building in the parish is Lowther Castle, a country house in the form of a sham castle. which is now in ruins; this and associated structures are listed. In the 1760s a model village was created, the buildings designed by Robert Adam, but was never completed; the existing buildings are all listed. Most of the other listed buildings are houses and associated structures, farmhouses and farm buildings. The other listed buildings include a church an item in the churchyard, a public house, two bridges, and a milestone.

== Key ==
Grade	Criteria
II*	Particularly important buildings of more than special interest
II	Buildings of national importance and special interest

== Buildings ==
Name and location	Photograph	Date	Notes	Grade
St Michael's Church; 54.61296°N 2.74629°W		12th century	The church was later altered, and was almost completely rebuilt in 1686 by Sir John Lowther. It is in sandstone, partly rendered, with quoins, an eaves cornice, and a green slate roof with coped gables. The church consists of a nave with a west porch, aisles, transepts, a tower at the crossing, and a chancel. The tower has three stages and a battlemented parapet.	II*
Churchyard cross 54.61285°N 2.74615°W	—	12th century	The cross is in the churchyard of St Michael's Church. It is in sandstone, and has been converted into a sundial. The base is a stepped stone with a socket; this has split and the parts are clamped together. The shaft has chamfered edges, and carries a flat cap that has an 18th-century brass plate without an inscription or gnomon.	II
Hackthorpe Hall; 54.59868°N 2.70642°W		Early 17th century	The farmhouse is in rendered limestone with a green slate roof, and has two storeys, a double depth plan, and three bays. On the front is a two-storey gabled porch. The windows are mullioned, and some also have transoms.	II*
Gates and gate piers, St Michael's Church; 54.61199°N 2.74607°W	—	Late 17th century	The gate piers and gates are at the southern entrance to the churchyard. The piers are in sandstone, and are rusticated with moulded caps. The gates date from the 20th century, they are in wrought iron and have scrolled decoration.	II
Mounting block 54.61297°N 2.74584°W	—	Late 17th century	The mounting block is in the churchyard of St Michael's Church. It is in sandstone, and consists of a square stone with steps rising to it from two sides.	II
Rose Cottage and stable 54.62004°N 2.68907°W	—	Late 17th century	The house and former stable are roughcast with a green slate roof. They have two storeys, the house has three bays, and the stable, now incorporated into the house, has one bay to the left. The doorway and the casement windows have stone surrounds, and in the stable is a flat-headed doorway.	II
Fossils; 54.62018°N 2.68929°W	—	Late 17th or early 18th century	A stone house with a green slate roof. There are two storeys and four bays, and a former two-bay stable to the right that has been incorporated into the house. The doorway has a plain surround. The windows to the left of the door are sashes, and the others are casements. In the former stable is a segmental-arched cart entrance, garage doors, and casement windows.	II
Gate piers, Lowther Castle; 54.61033°N 2.73465°W	—	Late 17th or early 18th century	The gate piers are to the east of the castle, and probably went out of use in the early 19th century. They are in sandstone, and are rusticated with shaped caps.	II
Lowther Castle Inn and former stables 54.60148°N 2.70891°W		1717	The inn and former stables are stuccoed with green slate roofs, partly hipped, and have two storeys. The inn has four bays, to the left is a recessed single-bay extension, and to the right are the former stables, dating from the late 18th century, higher and with three bays. The main doorway has a stone surround and a dated lintel, and this is flanked by bay windows. To the left is another doorway and a bay window, and in the stables are three plank doors. The windows are sashes.	II
Clematis Cottage and Sycamore Cottage; 54.61936°N 2.68867°W	—	Early 18th century	A pair of stone houses with a green slate roof. They have two storeys, and each house has three bays. Both houses have a doorway with a stone surround, and casement windows, some of which have retained their mullions.	II
Barns, Hackthorpe Hall; 54.59891°N 2.70648°W	—	Early 18th century	The barns are in stone with green slate roofs, partly hipped. They have two storeys and three bays, and a two-storey four-bay extension at right angles. The barns contain doors, windows, ventilation slits, and loft doors.	II
Park Side; 54.60941°N 2.73389°W	—	Early to mid 18th century	A roughcast house with a green slate roof, two storeys and six bays. The doorway has a chamfered surround, and the windows, which are casements have stone surrounds.	II
Walliss' House; 54.61021°N 2.73420°W	—	Early to mid 18th century	A roughcast house with a green slate roof, two storeys and five bays. The doorway and the sash windows have stone surrounds.	II
Woodside and Newtown Head; 54.60886°N 2.73367°W	—	Early to mid 18th century	A pair of roughcast houses with a green slate roof, two storeys, and five bays each. The doorways and casement windows have stone surrounds.	II
Brockle Bank and barn 54.60101°N 2.70791°W	—	Mid 18th century (probable)	The former farmhouse and barn have green slate roofs. The house is rendered with two storeys, two bays, a central doorway and casement windows all in stone surrounds. To the left is a higher barn dating from the early 19th century. It is in limestone with quoins, and has a segmental-arched cart entrance approached up a ramp, and this is flanked by ventilation slits.	II
Bush Cottage and barn 54.60199°N 2.70994°W	—	Mid 18th century	A stone farmhouse and barn with green slate roofs. The house is stuccoed, and has two storeys, three bays, and a two-bay rear extension. The doorway and sash windows have stone surrounds. To the right is a slightly higher barn, with one bay, twin plank doors, a loft door, and ventilation slits in two tiers.	II
Hill Rise; 54.60074°N 2.70757°W	—	Mid 18th century	A former farmhouse and barn in limestone, with sandstone quoins, a rendered front, and a green slate roof. There are two storeys and two bays, with a short former barn to the right. There is one mullioned window, the other windows are casements with the mullions removed. On the right side of the barn is a segmental arched opening containing garage doors.	II
Larch Cottage, barn and stable 54.61964°N 2.68838°W	—	Mid 18th century	Originally a farmhouse and outbuildings, later a private house, it is in sandstone with quoins and green slate roofs. The house has two storeys, two bays, a central door in a stone surround, and horizontally-sliding sash windows. To the right is a barn with a segmental headed cart entrance, and the stable to the right of that has doorways and a loft doorway with flat heads.	II
Whale Cottage and barn 54.58673°N 2.74168°W	—	Mid 18th century	A farmhouse and barn in stone with a green slate roof. The farmhouse is rendered, and has two storeys and two bays. There is a central gabled porch, a mullioned window, and three sash windows in stone surrounds. To the right is a two-bay barn with a segmental arched cart entrance, a plank door and a ventilation slit.	II
Whale Farm Cottage and barn 54.58642°N 2.74153°W	—	Mid 18th century	The farmhouse and barn are in sandstone. partly rendered, with a green slate roof, coped to the right. The house has two storeys and two bays, a door with a stone surround, and casement windows. The barn to the left is slightly higher, it has three bays, a segmental-headed cart entrance, a door, and casement windows.	II
Low Gardens Bridge; 54.61810°N 2.74314°W		Mid to late 18th century	The bridge carries a road over the River Lowther. It is in sandstone, and consists of a single shallow arch with embanked and ramped abutments. The bridge has two tiers of voussoirs, and parapets.	II
Lowther Cottage; 54.60533°N 2.71886°W	—	1766–73	A house in a model village designed by Robert Adam for Sir James Lowther. It is rendered with a string course and a hipped green slate roof. There are two storeys, the central three bays are recessed and are flanked by two-bay gabled wings, outside which are single-storey single-bay pavilions. The central doorway has a pilastered surround, and most of the sash windows have stuccoed surrounds. In the left pavilion is a plank door with a segmental head, and in the right pavilion is a large sash window.	II*
1–12 Lowther Village; 54.60589°N 2.72070°W		1766–73	A group of twelve houses in a model village designed by Robert Adam for Sir James Lowther. The houses are in sandstone with string courses, eaves cornices, and hipped green slate roofs. They are arranged on three sides of a courtyard. At the short end is a two-storey seven-bay house, and there are similar houses in the centres of both long sides. In between are two-storey three-bay houses flanked by single-storey two-bay wings, all in a continuous row. The doors and casement windows have plain surrounds and sandstone lintels.	II*
13–20 Lowther Village; 54.60613°N 2.71962°W		1766–73	A group of eight houses in a model village designed by Robert Adam for Sir James Lowther. The houses are in sandstone with hipped green slate roofs, and are arranged on three sides of a courtyard. The house at the head of the courtyard has two storeys, seven bays, the three central bays are recessed, and the outer bays form gabled wings. The other houses have one storey and numerous bays. The windows are casements with sandstone lintels and sills.	II*
21 and 22 Lowther Village; 54.60581°N 2.71830°W	—	1766–73	A group of houses, later combined into two dwellings, in a model village designed by Robert Adam for Sir James Lowther, forming one quadrant of a circus. The houses are in sandstone with string courses, and have green slate roofs hipped at the ends. The central part of ten bays is in a single storey, and at the ends are two-storey single-bay wings. The windows are casements with sandstone lintels and sills.	II*
23–26 Lowther Village; 54.60619°N 2.71865°W		1766–73	A group of four houses in a model village designed by Robert Adam for Sir James Lowther, forming one quadrant of a circus. The houses are in sandstone with string courses, and have green slate roofs hipped at the ends. The central nine bays have a single storey, and at the ends the houses have two storeys and two bays. The windows are casements with sandstone lintels and sills.	II*
Low Moor; 54.61515°N 2.72211°W	—	Late 18th century	A rendered farmhouse with a green slate roof. It has two storeys and three bays, a recessed two-storey single-bay extension to the left, and a single-storey single-bay extension to the right. The central doorway has a stone surround. The windows in the main part are mullioned, and in the extension they are sashes.	II
Pump and trough 54.60589°N 2.71940°W	—	Late 18th century	The water pump and trough are opposite a courtyard in Lowther model village. The pump is in sandstone and consists of a square column on a concrete plinth with a projecting water spout. In front of it is a rectangular stone trough.	II*
Thorpe Grange; 54.60274°N 2.71170°W	—	Late 18th century	A roughcast house with a green slate roof, hipped over the wings. There are two storeys and three recessed bays, flanked by single-bay wings. The doorway has a fanlight, and the windows are casements, all under flattened segmental arches.	II
Boxwood Cottage; 54.60197°N 2.70971°W	—	Late 18th to early 19th century	A pebbledashed house with a green slate roof, two storeys and two bays. On the front are sash windows, and on the right side is a doorway, all with sandstone surrounds.	II
Hearse house 54.61326°N 2.74645°W	—	Late 18th to early 19th century	The hearse house is a small square building in the churchyard of St Michael's Church. It is in sandstone, partly rendered, and has a slate roof with lead hips. On the front are double doors with segmental arches, and on the roof is a wooden louvred cupola.	II
Townend Farmhouse and barn 54.60260°N 2.70925°W	—	Late 18th to early 19th century	The farmhouse and barn are in limestone with green slate roofs. The house is rendered and has two storeys and three bays, and a two-bay rear extension at right angles. On the front is a porch, and the windows are sashes. The barn to the left has four bays, and contains a door, a loft door, casement windows, and ventilation slits.	II
Stable block, Lowther Castle; 54.60725°N 2.74029°W	—	1806–09	The stable and coach house were designed by Robert Smirke for the 1st Earl of Lonsdale. They are in calciferous sandstone with string courses, battlemented parapets, and green slate roofs, and they form three sides of a courtyard in a U-shaped plan. In the centre is a two-storey seven-bay coach house with segmental arches, mullioned windows with hood moulds, and the parapet rising to contain a clock face and a coat of arms. Along the sides are stables and battlemented turrets.	II*
Lodge, Lowther Castle; 54.60833°N 2.74219°W	—	1806–10	The lodge to the north of the house was designed by Robert Smirke for the 1st Earl of Lonsdale. It is in calciferous sandstone and has modillioned battlemented parapets. The lodge consists of two square turrets between which is a pointed arch; the arch has been blocked, forming a doorway with side lights.	II*
Inner terrace wall, ramps and steps, Lowther Castle; 54.60775°N 2.74209°W	—	1806–10	The terrace wall was designed by Robert Smirke for the 1st Earl of Lonsdale. It is in calciferous sandstone, and forms a low retaining wall for the first stage of the garden terrace. There is a central flight of steps and flanking carriage ramps. The wall turns at 45° with low circular turrets at the corners.	II*
Outer Terrace Wall, Lowther Castle; 54.60842°N 2.74128°W	—	1806–10	The terrace wall was designed by Robert Smirke for the 1st Earl of Lonsdale. It is in calciferous sandstone with battlemented parapets. The wall is low and has an approximately C-shaped plan. On each angle is a small rectangular turret with loops.	II*
Lowther Castle; 54.60727°N 2.74152°W		1806–14	A country house, built as a sham castle, but now a ruin. It was designed by Robert Smirke for the 1st Earl of Lonsdale and was closed in 1936. The house is in calciferous sandstone with a string course and battlemented parapets. There is a central three-storey three-bay block flanked by two-storey two-bay wings. Outside these are low recessed links to two-storey three-bay pavilions. At each angle is a round or octagonal turret, and behind the front is a tall square stair tower. In the centre of the front is a porte-cochère, and the windows are in Tudor style.	II*
Barn south of Hill Rise; 54.60063°N 2.70729°W	—	Early 19th century	The barn is in limestone with sandstone dressings, quoins and a green slate roof. There are two storeys and four bays. On the front is a gabled cart entrance, and elsewhere are doors, loft doors and ventilation slits.	II
Lilac Cottage; 54.60907°N 2.73372°W	—	Early 19th century	A rendered house with a green slate roof, two storeys and five bays. There is a central door with a fanlight, and sash windows, all with sandstone surrounds.	II
Milestone; 54.60679°N 2.71598°W	—	1825	The milestone is in cast iron, and it consists of a fluted post with a round head. The milestone is inscribed with the distances in miles to Shap and to Penrith, and between them is the year.	II
Lowther Mausoleum; 54.61229°N 2.74639°W		1857	The mausoleum is in the churchyard of St Michael's Church, and is in calciferous sandstone, with panels in polished Shap granite. It has a rectangular plan with sides of three bays, and consists of a chamber over a basement. There is a battlemented shaped parapet, and octagonal angle turrets with carved heads and griffins. Inside is a seated statue of the 2nd Earl of Lonsdale.	II
Askham Bridge; 54.60805°N 2.74703°W		1897	The bridge carries a road over the River Lowther. It is in pink sandstone ashlar, and consists of a single segmental arch. The bridge has recessed voussoirs, a string course, and solid parapets with chamfered coping. The abutments have stepped buttresses supporting four pedestrian refuges, and on the parapets are inscribed stones.	II
