= Recreational walks in Norfolk =

Walking routes in Norfolk, England

The following are lists of recreational walks in Norfolk, England.

== Short walks ==
The following walks are some of the routes.

- Blickling Hall has three waymarked walks.
- Bure Valley Way, 14 kilometres from Aylsham to Wroxham
- Felbrigg Hall has waymarked walks.
- Foxley Wood Nature Reserve, off the road from Foxley to Themelthorpe, has waymarked walks.
- Great Eastern Pingo Trail, 13 kilometre circular at Stow Bedon near Thompson, parking is on the A1075, in the old railway station yard.
- Hickling Broad Nature Reserve at Hickling has a waymarked walk.
- Horsey Windpump has waymarked walks.
- Old Wood at Sheringham has a waymarked circular walk.
- Oxburgh Hall has a 'Woodland Explorer' trail.
- Peter Scott walk, 17 kilometre walk from Sutton Bridge (where it joins the Nene Way), to the ferry crossing on the River Great Ouse at King's Lynn.
- Thornham has a very pretty 5 mile circular coastal route called Anna's Walk which takes in Holme Dunes, one of England's wildest beaches.
- Sheringham Park has several waymarked walks, including one to the North Norfolk Railway.
- Snakeshill Wood at Old Costessey has a waymarked circular walk.
- In Thetford Forest on the Norfolk/Suffolk border, Great Hockham has walks of 2 and 3.5 kilometres; High Lodge Forest Centre has 4 walks — two of 1.5 kilometres, one of 4.5 kilometres, plus an easy-access trail; Lynford Arboretum has two trails of 1.5 and 2 kilometres, plus an easy-access trail; Lynford Stag has walks of 2 and 3 kilometres; Rishbeth Wood has a 5.5 kilometre walk; St. Helens has a walk described as requiring 2.5 hours
- Wensum Riverside Walk, approximately one follows the River Wensum from Norwich City Centre to Hellesdon, where it meets the Marriott's Way.
- Wensum Way, a 12-mile footpath route from Gressenhall to Lenwade.
- Yare Valley Walk. Runs alongside the River Yare from Bowthorpe Southern Park in Norwich to Marston Marsh.

== Longer walks ==
- Kett's Country, 34 kilometres from Norwich to Wymondham
- Marriott's Way, 34 kilometres from Norwich to Aylsham
- Paston Way, 32 kilometres from Cromer to North Walsham (the walk was re-launched on 31 May 2006)
- Tas Valley Way, 40 kilometres from Norwich to Attleborough

== Long-distance paths ==
The Norfolk Trails are a network of long distance footpaths formed by Norfolk County Council.

A long distance circular tour of 359 kilometres around Norfolk can be completed by following the Angles Way, Peddar's Way, Norfolk Coast Path and Weavers' Way. It is also possible to walk across Norfolk from Kings Lynn to Great Yarmouth, a route of 96 miles following the Nar Valley Way, the Wensum Way, The Marriott's Way and the Wherryman's Way.

- Angles Way, 123 kilometres from Great Yarmouth to Knettishall Heath, with much of the path following the Norfolk/Suffolk border. Additionally there is a link path from Knettishall Heath to Thetford.
- Boudica's Way, 60 kilometres from Norwich to Diss.
- Fen Rivers Way, runs 98.5 kilometres Cambridge to King's Lynn.
- Hereward Way, 166 kilometres from Oakham to East Harling (Rutland, Lincolnshire, Cambridgeshire, Norfolk). The Stamford to Peterborough section is not fully waymarked, but walkers travelling between those two places can follow the waymarked Torpel Way.
- Marriott's Way, 26 miles from Norwich to Aylsham.
- Nar Valley Way, 54 kilometres King's Lynn to Gressenhall.
- Norfolk Coast Path National Trail, 72 kilometres from Holme-next-the-Sea to Cromer.
- Ouse Valley Way, 240 kilometres from Syresham, Northamptonshire to King's Lynn, Norfolk via Buckinghamshire, Bedfordshire and Cambridgeshire.
- Peddar's Way National Trail, 74 kilometres from Knettishall Heath to Holme-next-the-Sea.
- Weavers' Way, 90 kilometres from Cromer to Great Yarmouth.
- Wensum Way, 12 miles from Gressenhall, the end of the Nar Valley Way to Lenwade, and the Marriott's Way.
- Wherryman's Way, 56 kilometres following the River Yare from Norwich to Great Yarmouth

== See also ==
- Long-distance footpaths in the UK
- Norfolk Trails
