= Norfolk Trails =

Footpath network in Norfolk, England

Norfolk County Council manages and promotes a number of long-distance footpaths in the county under the Norfolk Trails brand. The Norfolk Trails network brings together over 1,200 miles of walks, cycle and bridle routes throughout the county of Norfolk. They aim to help people discover the diverse landscape of unique market towns, rich wildlife and cultural heritage which Norfolk is so well known for.

It was initially considered a controversial decision within the walking community, as it involved a focusing of the council's resources for Public Rights of Way on these key routes. However, the trails are expanding to encompass a series of popular circular walks and it is the council's aim is to maintain and promote the Norfolk Trail routes to the same standard as the National Trails.

== The Trails ==
- Angles Way
- Boudicca Way
- Marriott's Way
- Nar Valley Way
- Norfolk Coast Path
- Paston Way
- Peddars Way
- Weavers' Way
- Wensum Way
- Wherryman's Way

== See also ==
- Official Norfolk Trails website
- Recreational walks in Norfolk
