= Anna's Walk =

Footpath in Norfolk, England

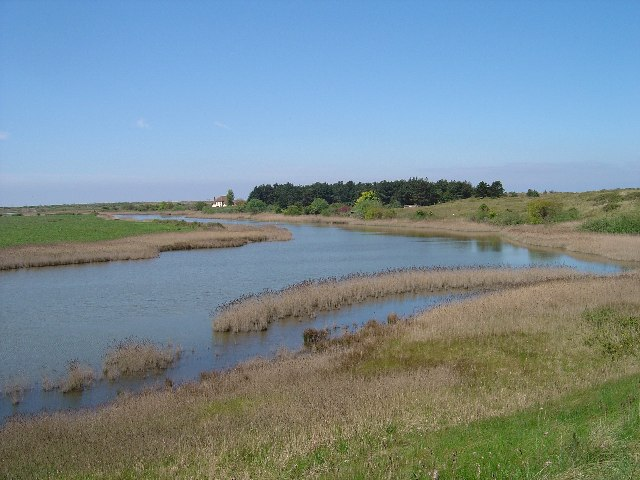
Broadwater, a freshwater lake

Anna's Walk is a well-trodden five-mile circular walk on the North Norfolk coast around the village of Thornham and sands of Holme Dunes. The walk takes in parts of the village, a woodland stretch beside Drove Orchards, salt marshes, Holme Dunes beach, Thornham Harbour and the Village Green.

The walk starts on the High street in Thornham at Anna's former home. Heading towards Holme pick up the footpath adjacent to the new village hall and cricket pitch that was built in 2013. The footpath crosses the A149 close to Drove House, the family home of David Jamieson (VC) who at the age of 23 was awarded the Victoria Cross, the path continues through the gate and along the tree-lined pathway until at the far end where there is a bridge on the left. The trail joins the Norfolk Coast Path which leads up to Holme Dunes Reserve.

The reserve's sand dunes, salt marsh, pasture and pools are important for breeding birds like pied avocet, and wintering ducks, geese and waders. There are a range of coastal habitats including, freshwater pools, grazing marsh and saltmarsh. Much of the site consists of natural habitats maintained largely by coastal processes. A few steps from the route is the Reserves’ Cafe and bookshop and the Holme Bird Observatory. Straight down is the Holme Dunes beach which was named by the Sunday Times as one of the Top 20 ‘Wild’ Beaches in Britain. This is also the place where Seahenge was discovered in the spring of 1998. Seahenge is a prehistoric monument believed to have been constructed during the early Bronze Age. Contemporary theory is that it was used for ritual purposes. The monument was removed in 1999 amid large protests to a local museum.

Holme Dunes Beach is a wide unspoilt sandy beach but approximately a 20-minute walk from any public car parks so usually quieter than most on the Norfolk coast. Walk along the beach until you find an information lectern in the sands by the dunes. This path leads back to the Norfolk Coast Path and back towards the village of Thornham. On a clear day visitors can see Scolt Head Island which was purchased by the National Trust in 1923 and became a national nature reserve.

At the end of the path is Thornham Harbour, once a prosperous harbour and infamous smugglers' haunt. In 1999 it was remodelled as a smugglers' hideout for the BBC production of Great Expectations. Today it is one of the most photographed places on the Norfolk coast with the Old Coal barn and fishing boats lopsidedly sitting on the flats. The trail continues along the coastal path, from which the Lifeboat Inn is visible. The buildings stood witness to one of the worst skirmishes between the smugglers' local militia and a small force of Dragoon Guards on New Year's Eve of 1782. Hansard documents the incident. The footpath leads around the village through to the green and then to the centre past the medieval church where Anna is buried and the Orange Tree pub which was formerly The Kings Head and also has a rich history over the centuries.

The walk finishes once again at Anna's House but is circular so can be commenced and completed from anywhere on the route. Anna herself died at Helmingham Hall in Suffolk which has been home to the Tollemache family since 1480.

Anna's Walk was highlighted in the Eastern Daily Press, 'Favourite five hidden walks' regional feature in 2019. It was also named in 2013 by The Sunday Times as one of the 'Best UK Winter Walks'

== See also ==
- Peddars Way
- Bure Valley Way
- Great Eastern Pingo Trail
- Wensum Way
- Recreational walks in Norfolk
