= Paston Way =

Long-distance footpath in Norfolk, England

The Paston Way
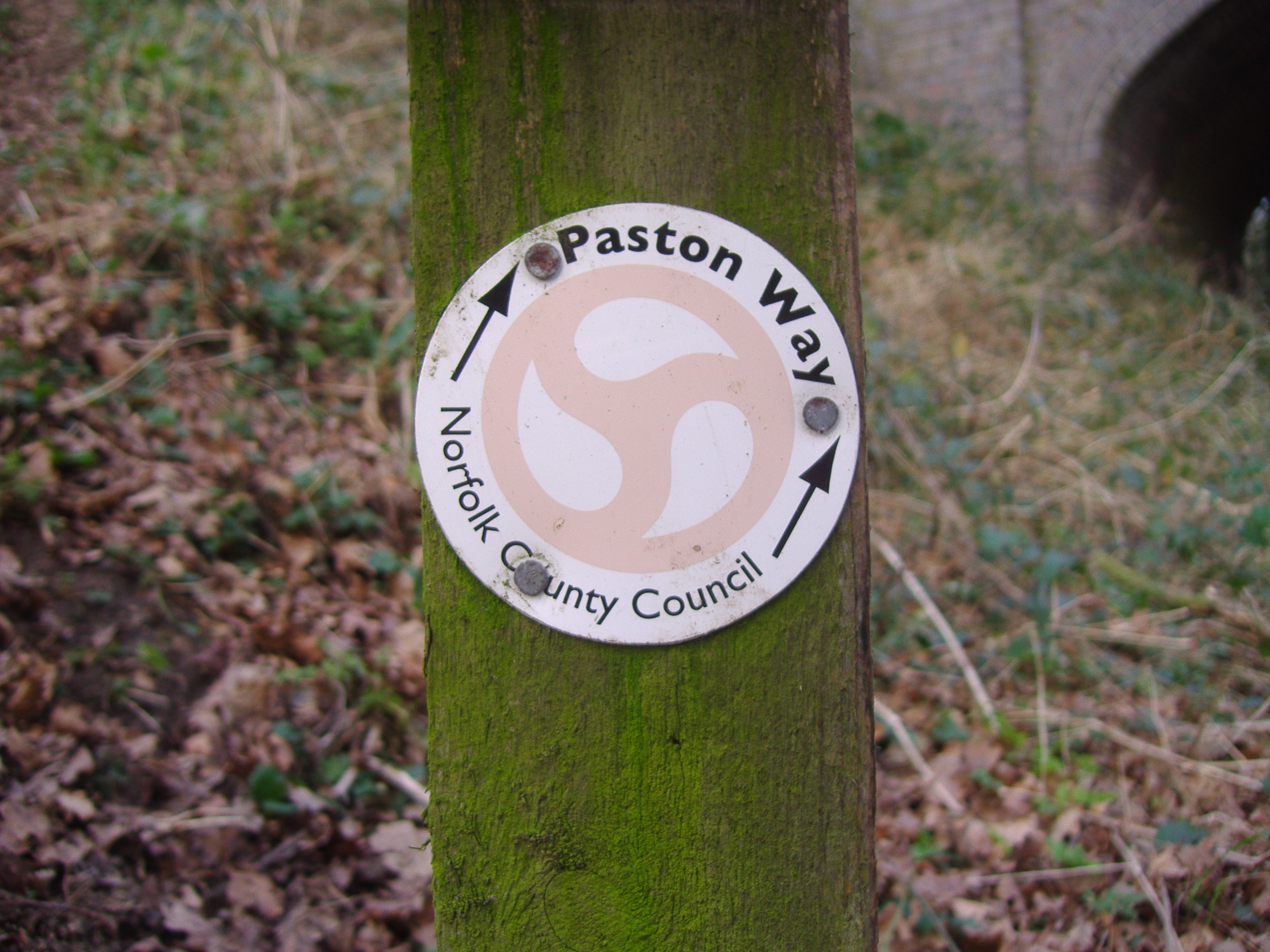
- Paston Way route marker
- Length: 20 mi (32 km)
- Location: Northeastern Norfolk
- Designation: Recreational walk
- Trailheads: North Walsham; 52.8216°N 1.3869°E; Cromer; 52.9314°N 1.3006°E
- Use: Walking
- Season: All year round
- Sights: Route takes in 16 churches and 16 villages and towns.

The Paston Way is a footpath located entirely within the English county of Norfolk in the United Kingdom. The footpath is twenty miles in length, with portals to the path at Cromer at its northwestern end and at North Walsham at it southeastern end.

== The designation ==
The Paston way takes its name from the Paston Family, who, during the Medieval and Tudor periods, were the dominant and wealthy landowners in which much of the trail passes. The Paston Family in turn had taken their name after the north eastern coastal village of Paston. Their origins were from Wulston, one of William the Conqueror’s men who arrived with him in 1066.

== Description of the route ==
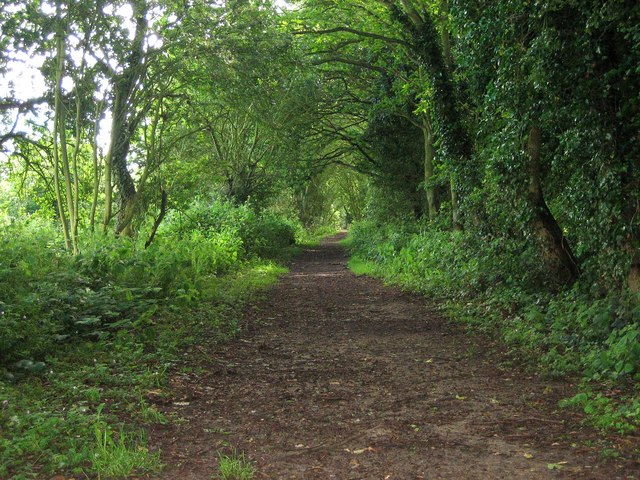
Knapton Cutting

Starting at the southeastern end, the path begins at the Parish Church of St Nicholas in the town of North Walsham. This is also the path's conjunction with the Weavers' Way. Leaving the church the route heads northwards along the old Mundesley road out of the town. On the outskirts of the town the path follows the track bed of the disused Norfolk and Suffolk Joint Railway Company, which linked North Walsham to Cromer. The path crosses the North Walsham and Dilham Canal at Swafield. Knapton Cutting, as this part of the trail is known, is also a nature and Butterfly reserve. This section is an area of wild flowers, brambles, scrub and undisturbed grassy banks, which make it an ideal habitat for butterflies. Nineteen different species have been recorded. The path then heads to Knapton Parish church in Knapton. This church, St Peters and Paul's, marks the end of the first section of the route.

From Knapton the path heads south east across several open fields towards the village of Edingthorpe. The approach to the village is up a gently sloping farm track towards Edingthorpe Parish church which is called All Saints. The 'way' continues on from All Saints northwest towards the coast and the village of Bacton.

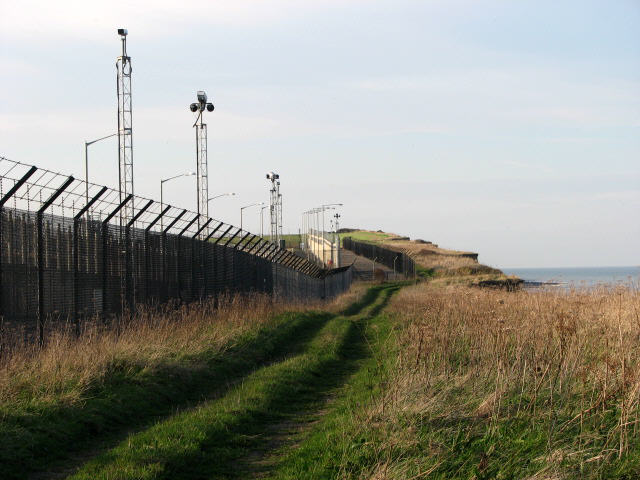
Paston Way passing the Bacton Gas Terminal

In Bacton, the ‘Way’ passes through the church yard of St Andrews and out across open farm land towards the North Sea coast at the western end of the village. The next three miles take a route along the beach passing by the Bacton Gas Interconnector Terminal. At Mundesley the route follows the main coast road to the northern tip of the village and to All Saints Church.

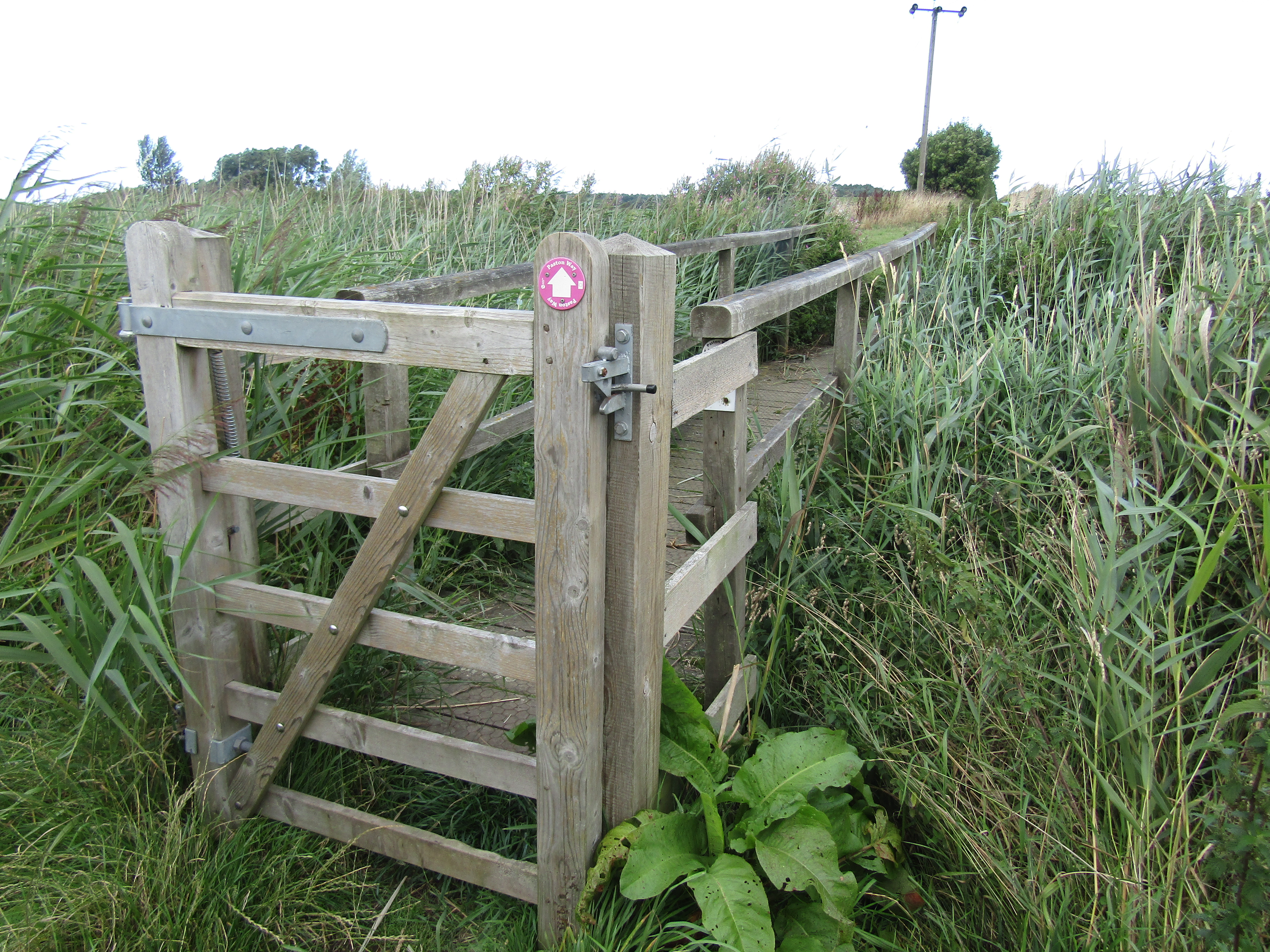
The footpath crosses the river Mun

The route now heads back inland towards the next village of Gimingham, where the trail passes through the valley of the River Mun. On this part of the trail Trimingham Early warning station, part of RAF Neatishead, can be seen. The path enters the village of Gimingham past the rebuilt old corn watermill and the preserved steam engine. Like Mundesley, Gimingham parish church is called All Saints. It is south down the main street from the engine. From this point there is an optional tour which takes in the villages of Trunch, Swafield, Bradfield and then back on itself to Trimingham and the church St John the Baptist's Head.

From Gimingham the path heads towards Southrepps via a lane known as Jack o' Lantern's Lane. The lane is reputed to be the territory of the Lantern man who lures all travellers to their doom. The parish church of Southrepps is called St James.

From Southrepps the path takes a route to the south of Frogshall Hamlet along the ancient farm lanes towards the coastal village of Overstrand. There are two detours that can be made on this section: the first is to the village of Northrepps and its parish church, St Mary the Virgin; the second to Sidestrand and its small parish church, St Michael and All Angels.

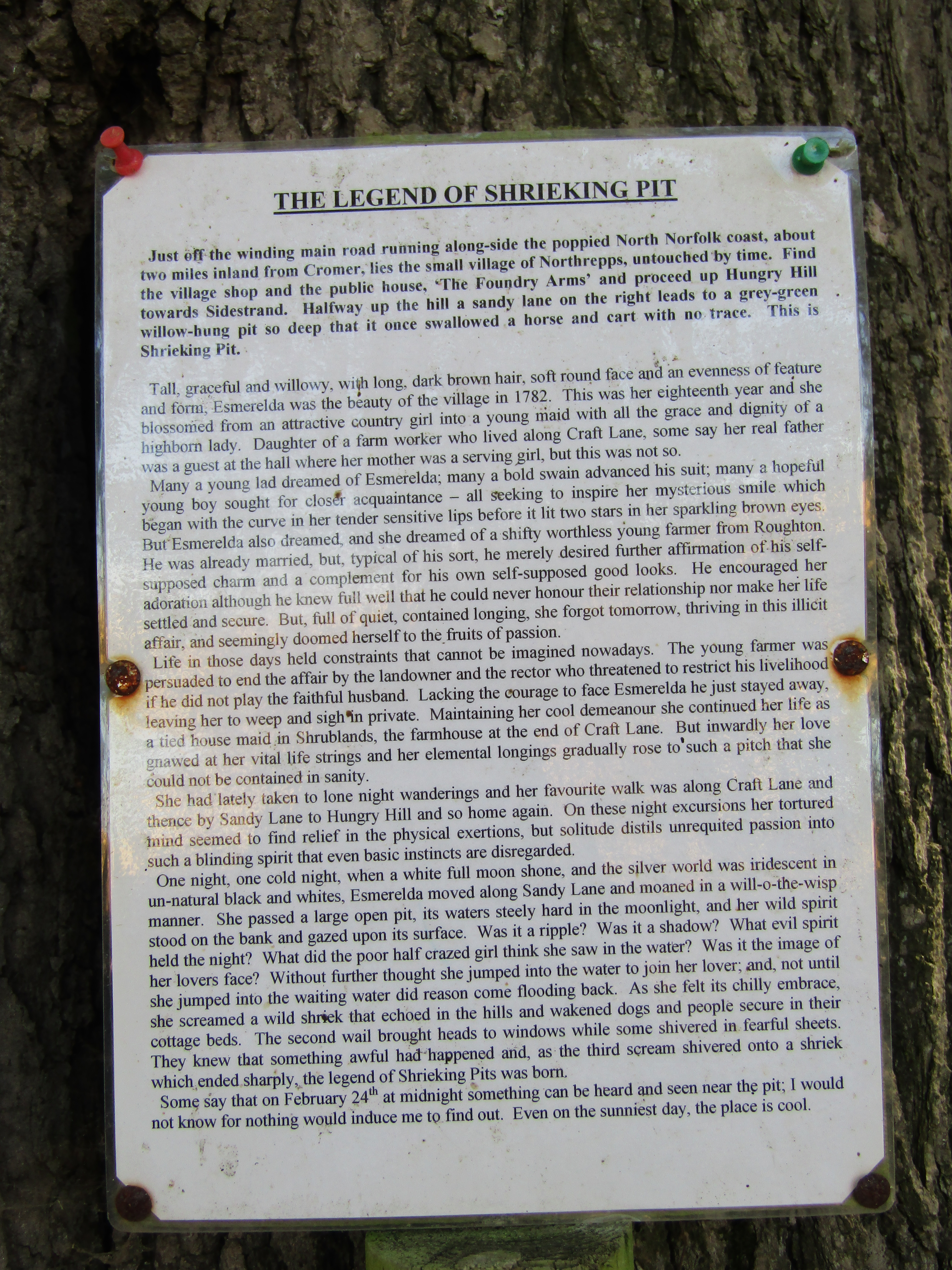
Legend of the Shrieking Pit

The main path continues to Northrepps, passing Shrieking pit, which legend has it was the scene of the demise of a young maiden lured to her death by evil spirits. Afterward, the path turns north towards Overstrand down Toll's Hill, once the site of a warning beacon during the time of the Napoleonic wars, and on to the shoreline. Overstrand Parish church is called St Martin's, and Priscilla Buxton is buried there.

The last section of Paston way is between Overstrand and Cromer. The route follows the coastline here, with an alternative route along the coast road. This part of the coastline is reputed to be the stalking ground of Legendary hellhound Black Shuck. The path continues on to Cromer and the Parish Church of St Peter and Saint Paul, the tower of which 160 ft high and marks the end of Paston Way. The path links with the North Norfolk Coastal Path/Peddars Way and the UK National Trails Network.

== Gallery of churches ==
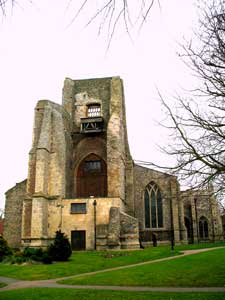
Saint Nicholas, North Walsham

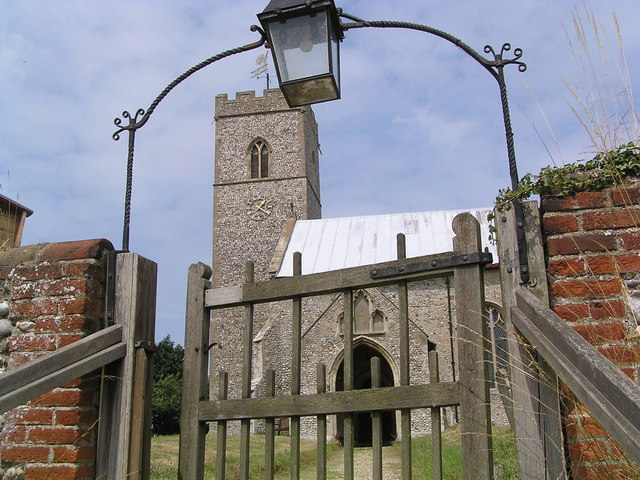
Saint Peter and Saint Paul, Knapton

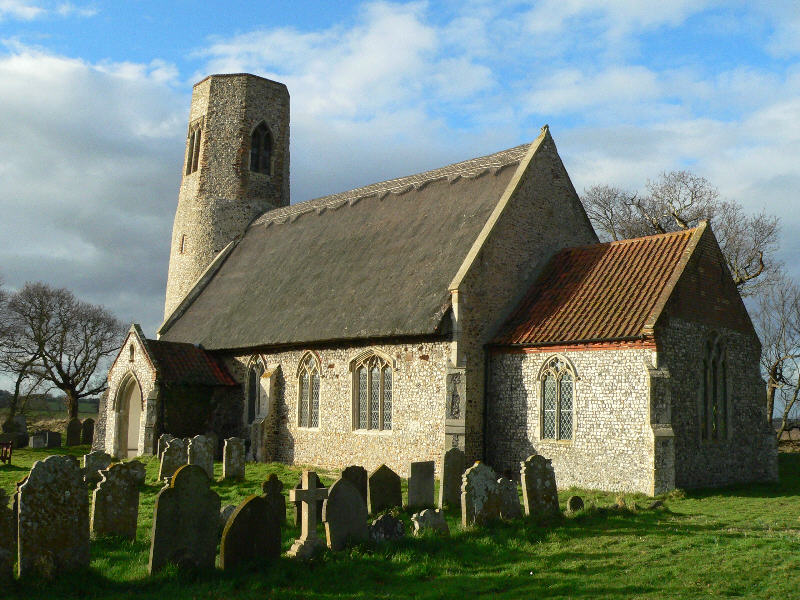
All Saints, Edingthorpe

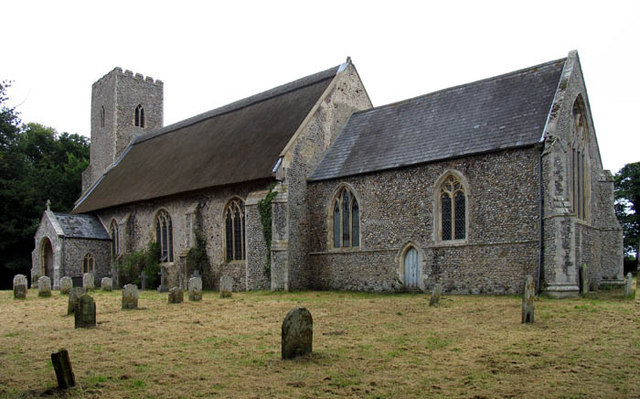
Saint Margaret, Paston

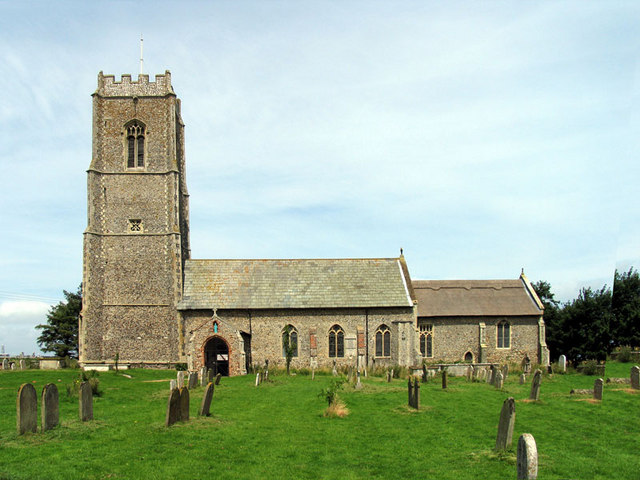
Saint Andrew, Bacton

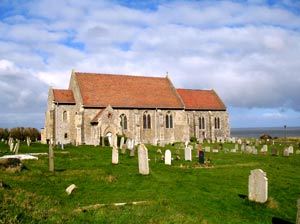
All Saints, Mundesley

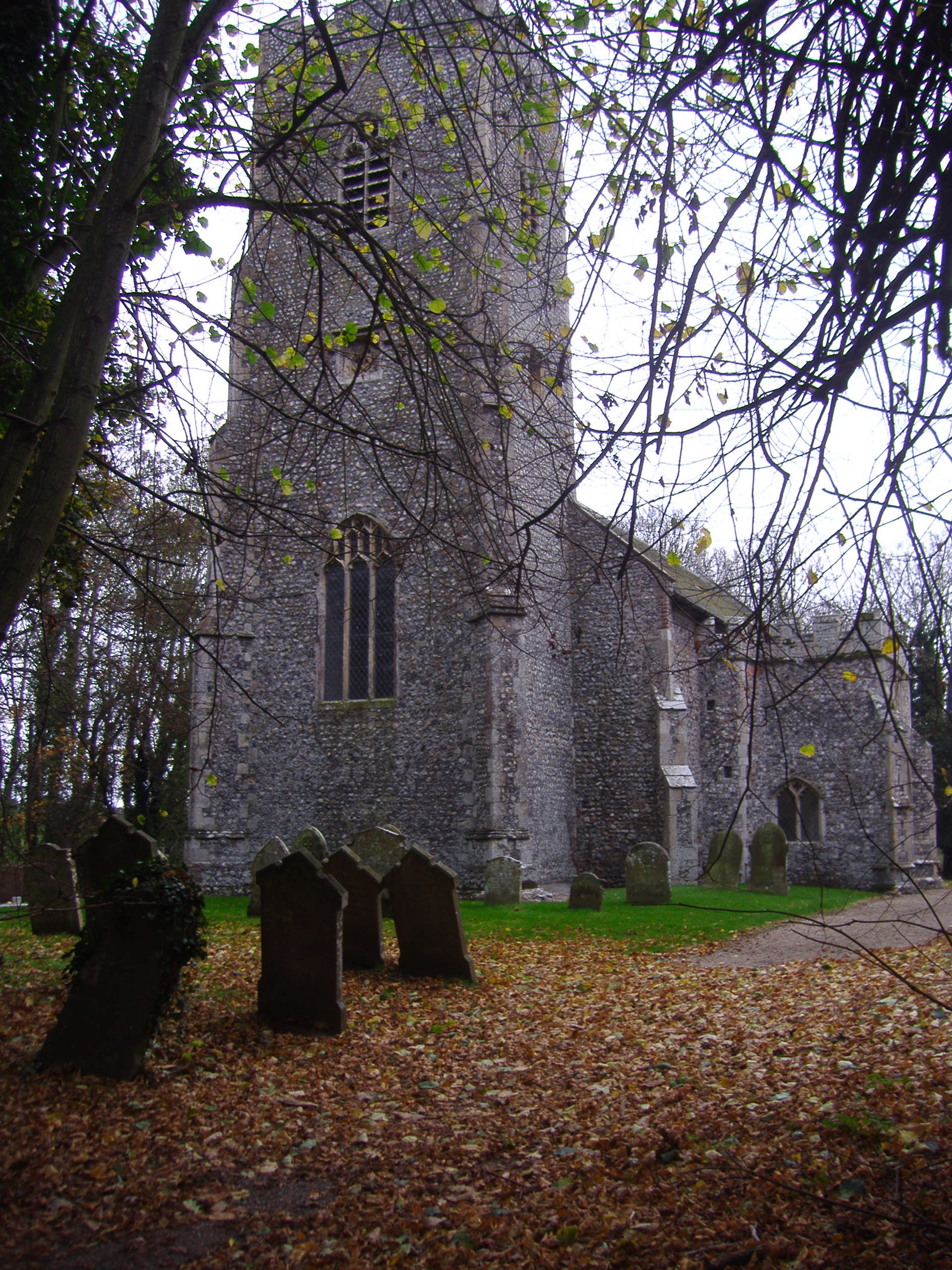
All Saints, Gimingham

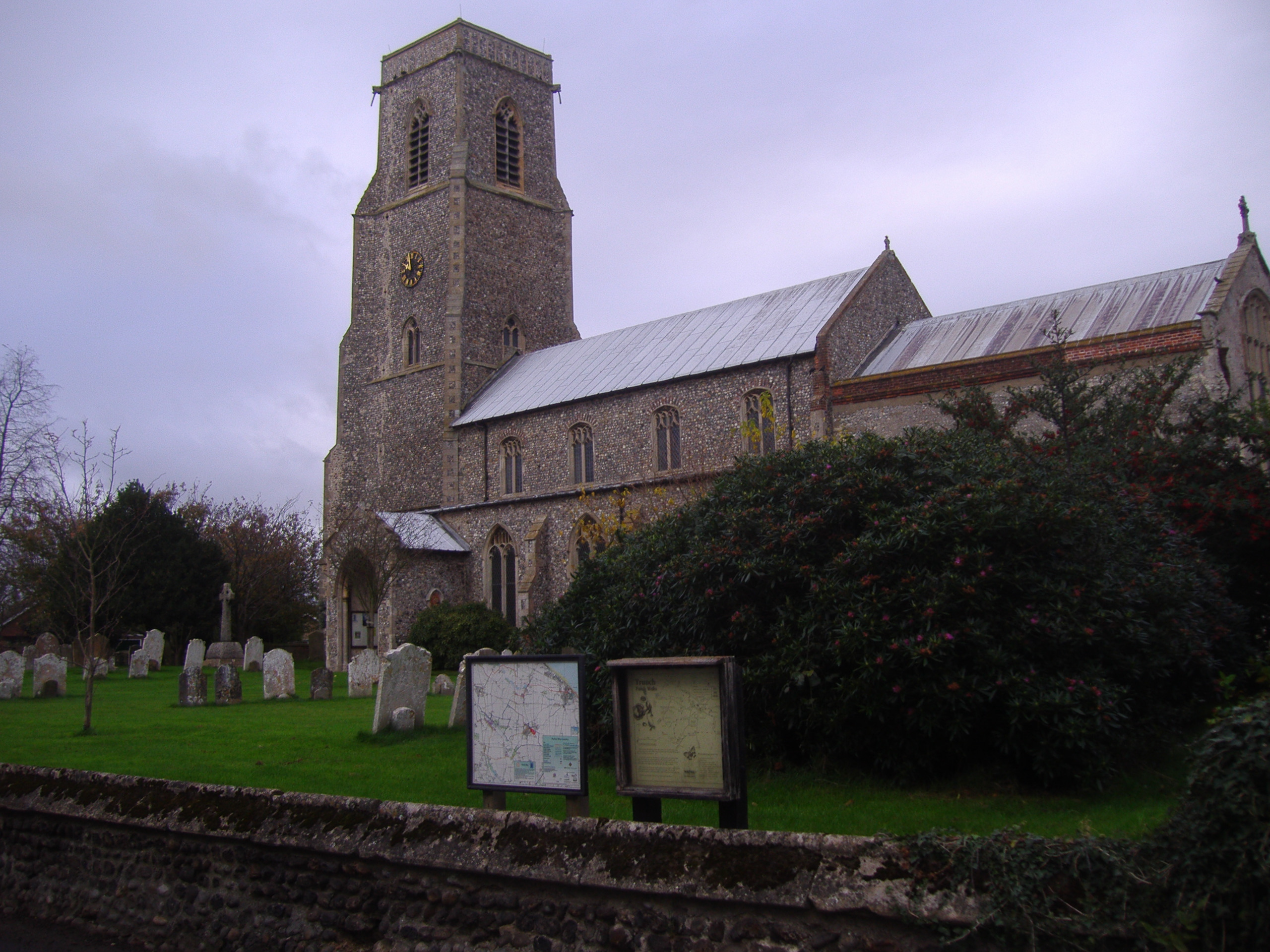
Saint Botolph, Trunch

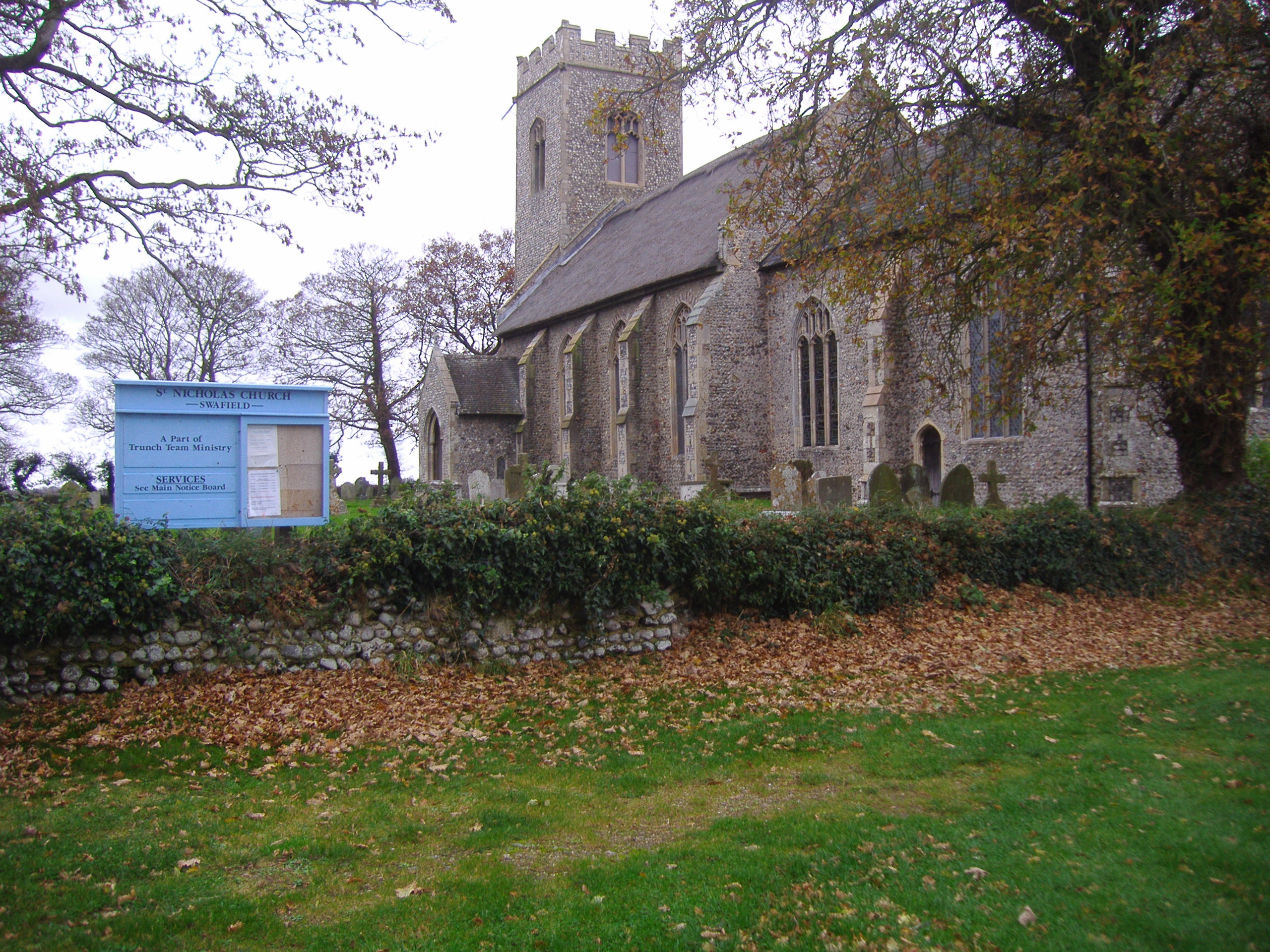
Saint Nicholas, Swafield

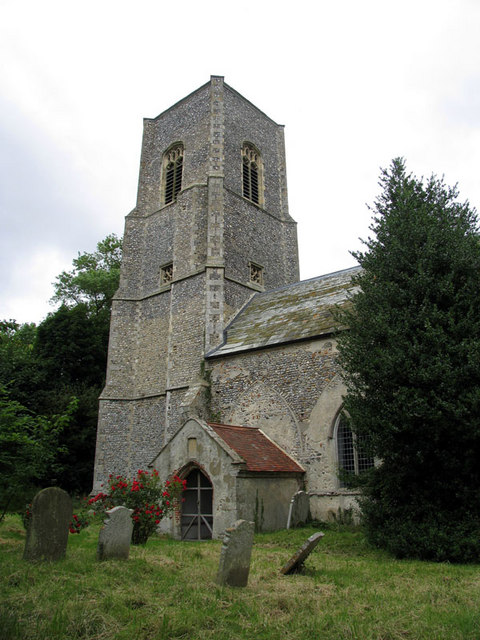
Saint Giles, Bradfield

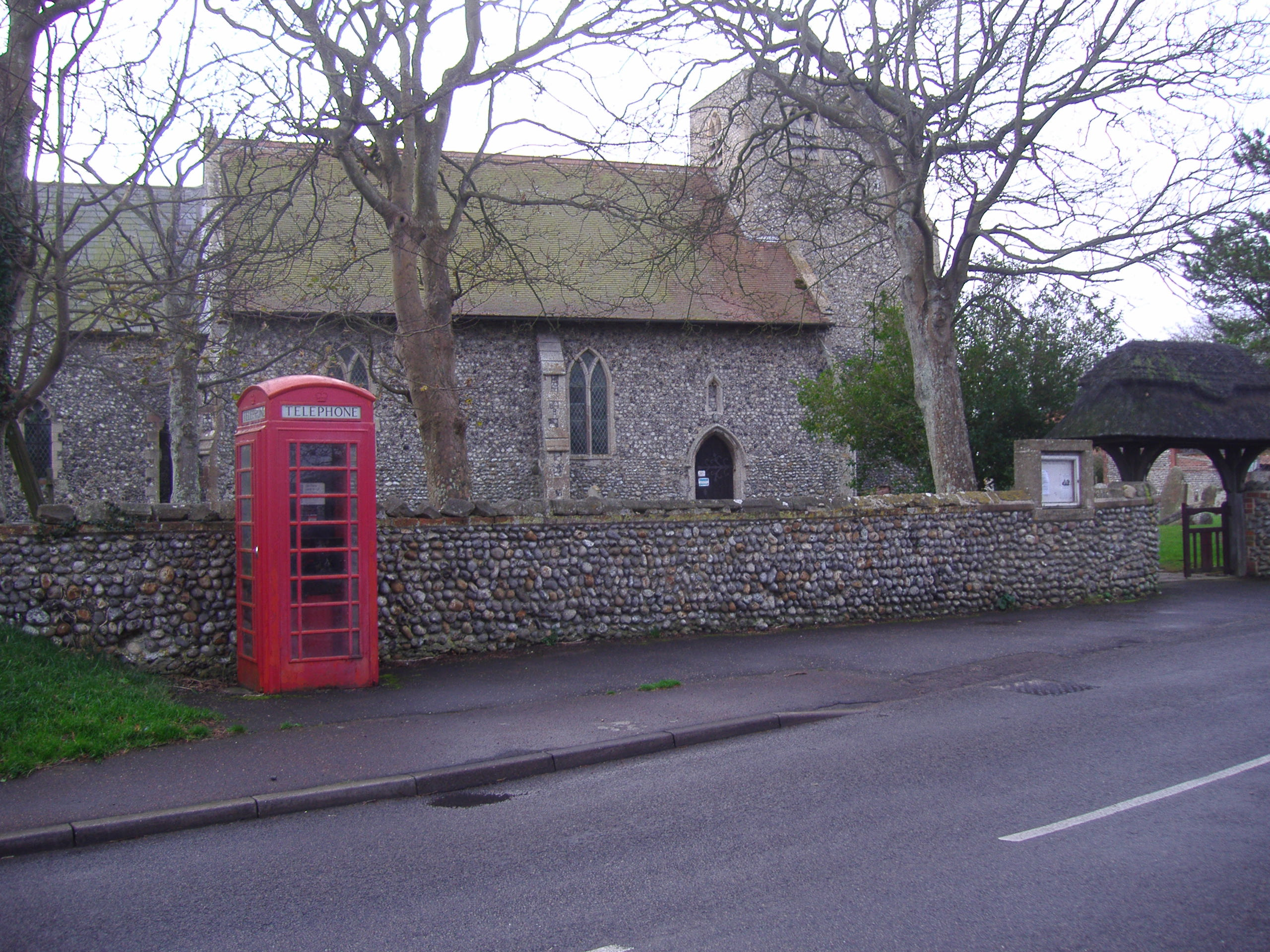
Saint John the Baptist's Head, Trimingham

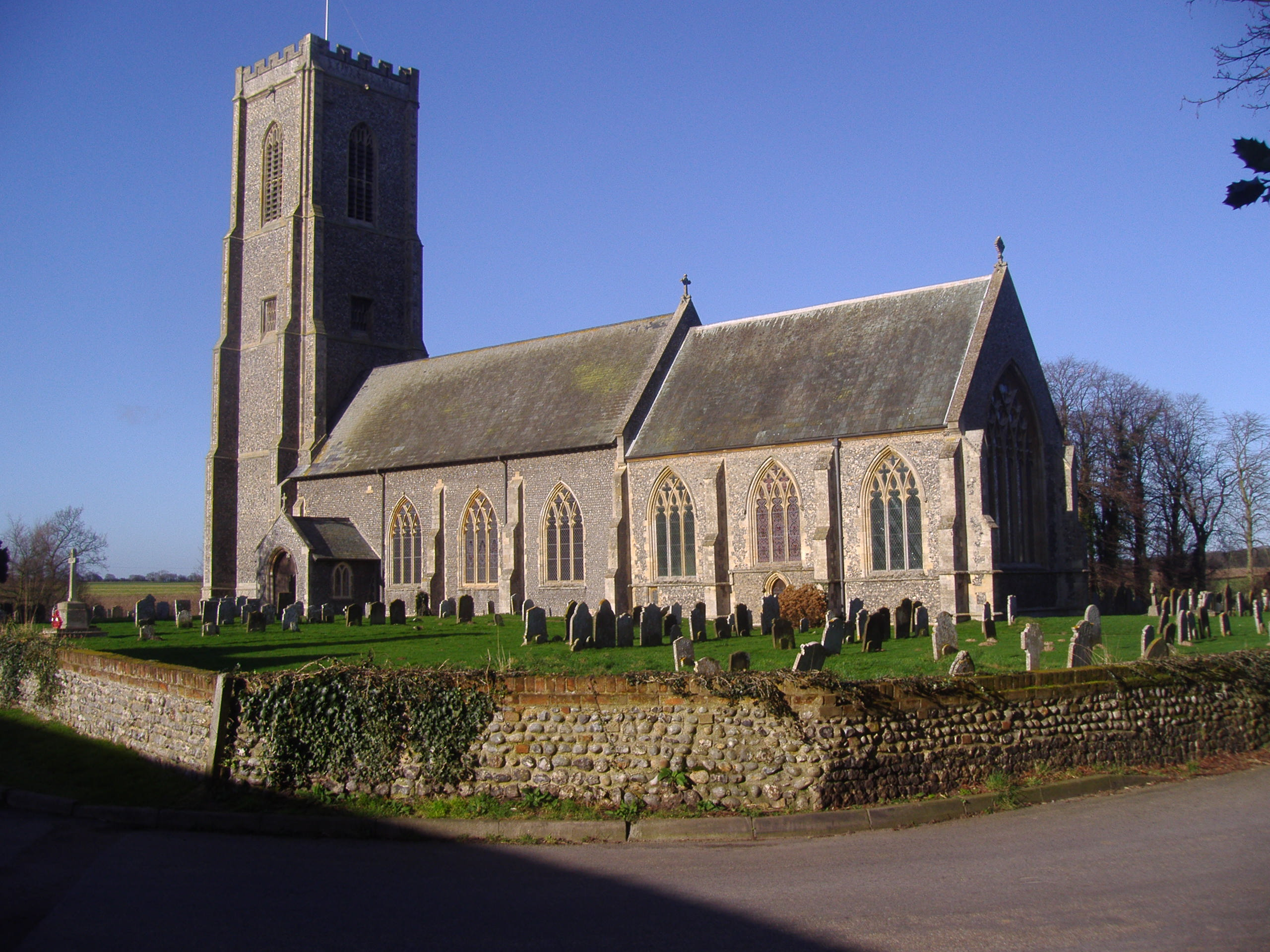
Saint James, Southrepps

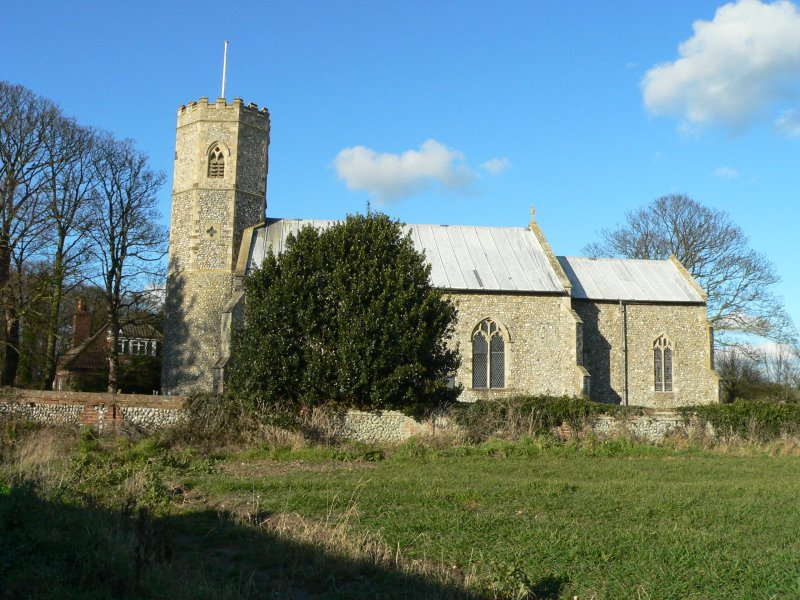
Saint Michael and All Angels, Sidestrand

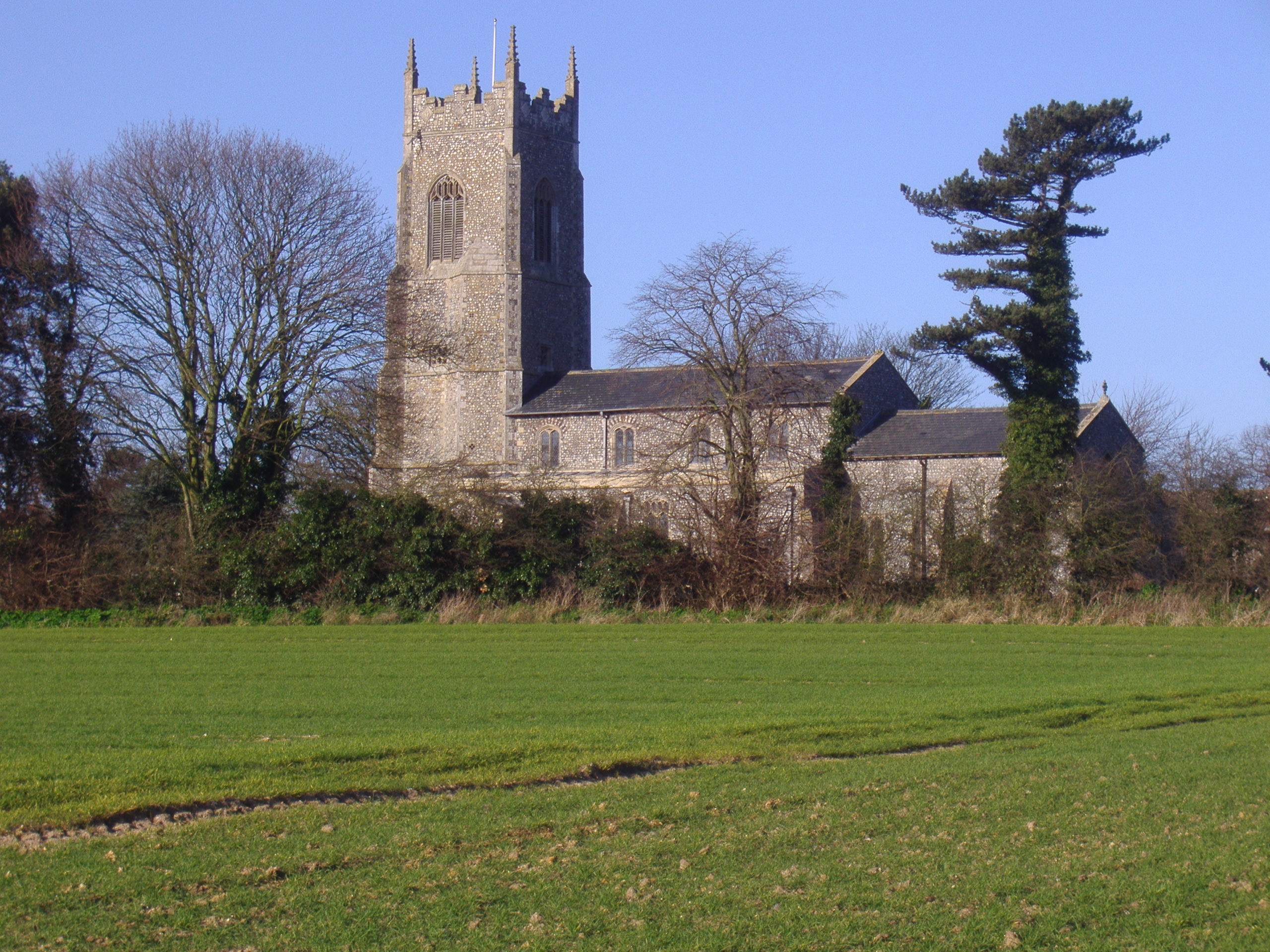
Saint Mary the Virgin, Northrepps

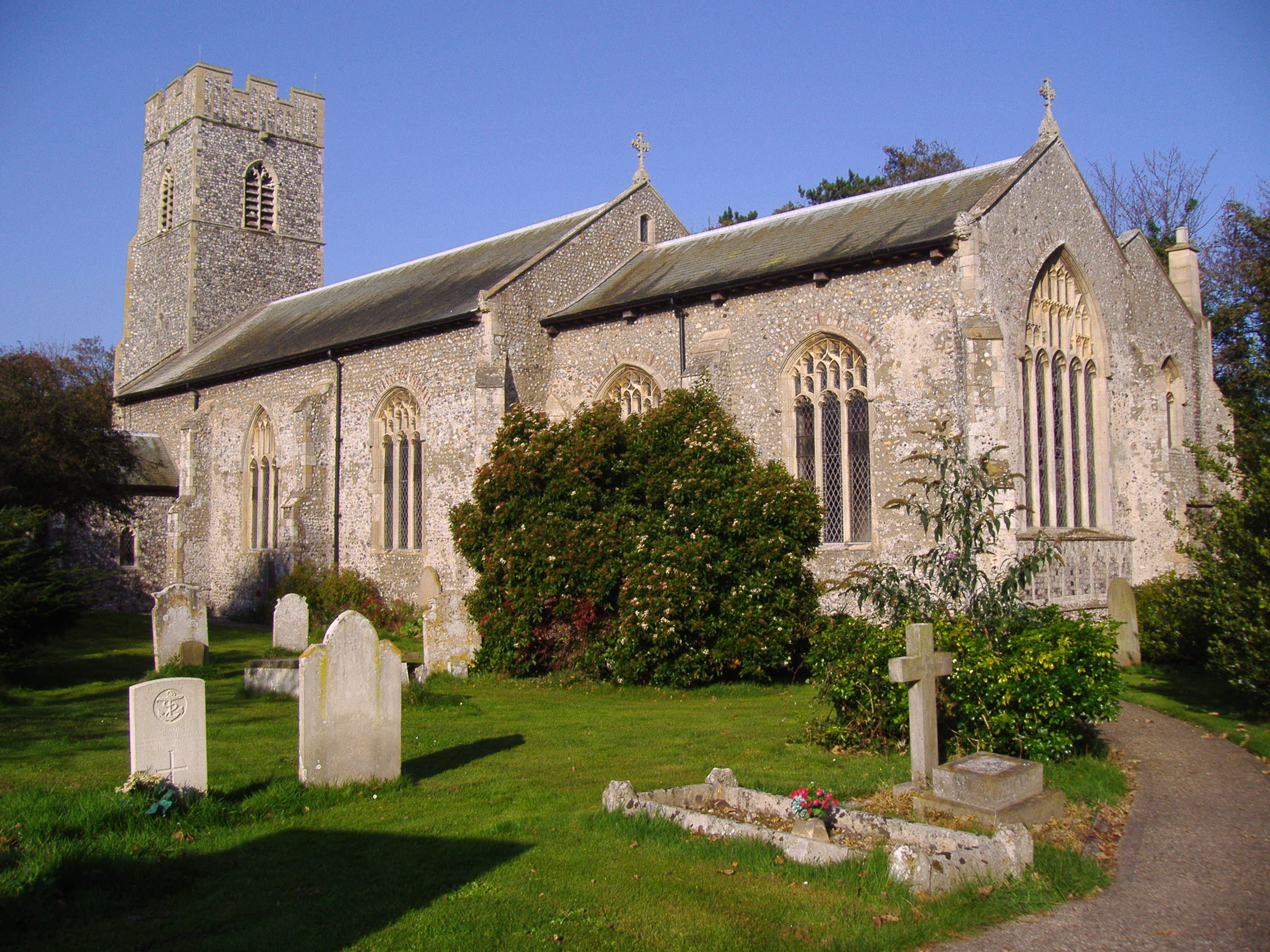
Saint Martin, Overstrand

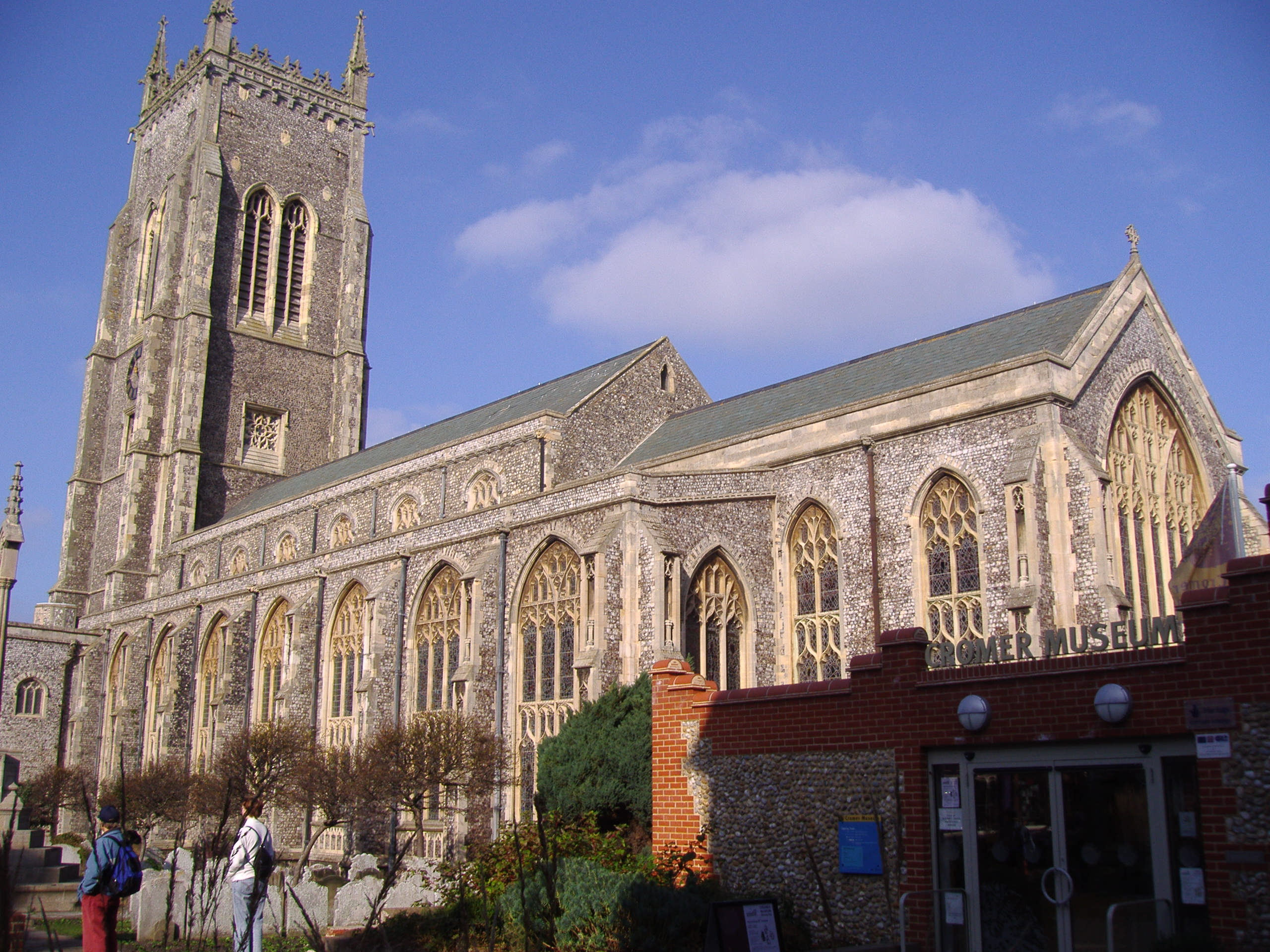
Saint Peter and Saint Paul, Cromer

== Gallery of route ==
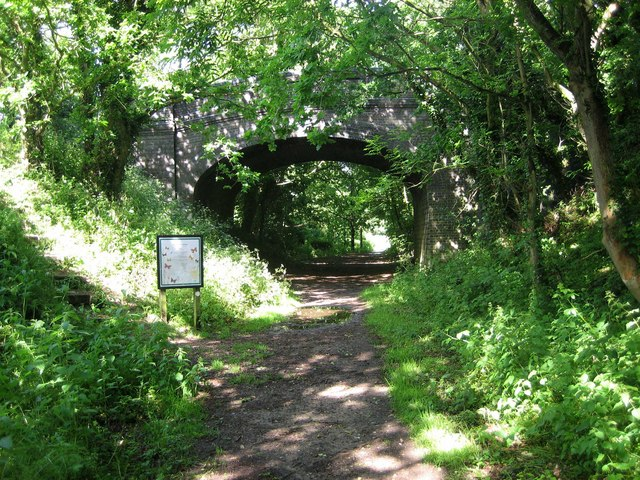
Knapton Cutting

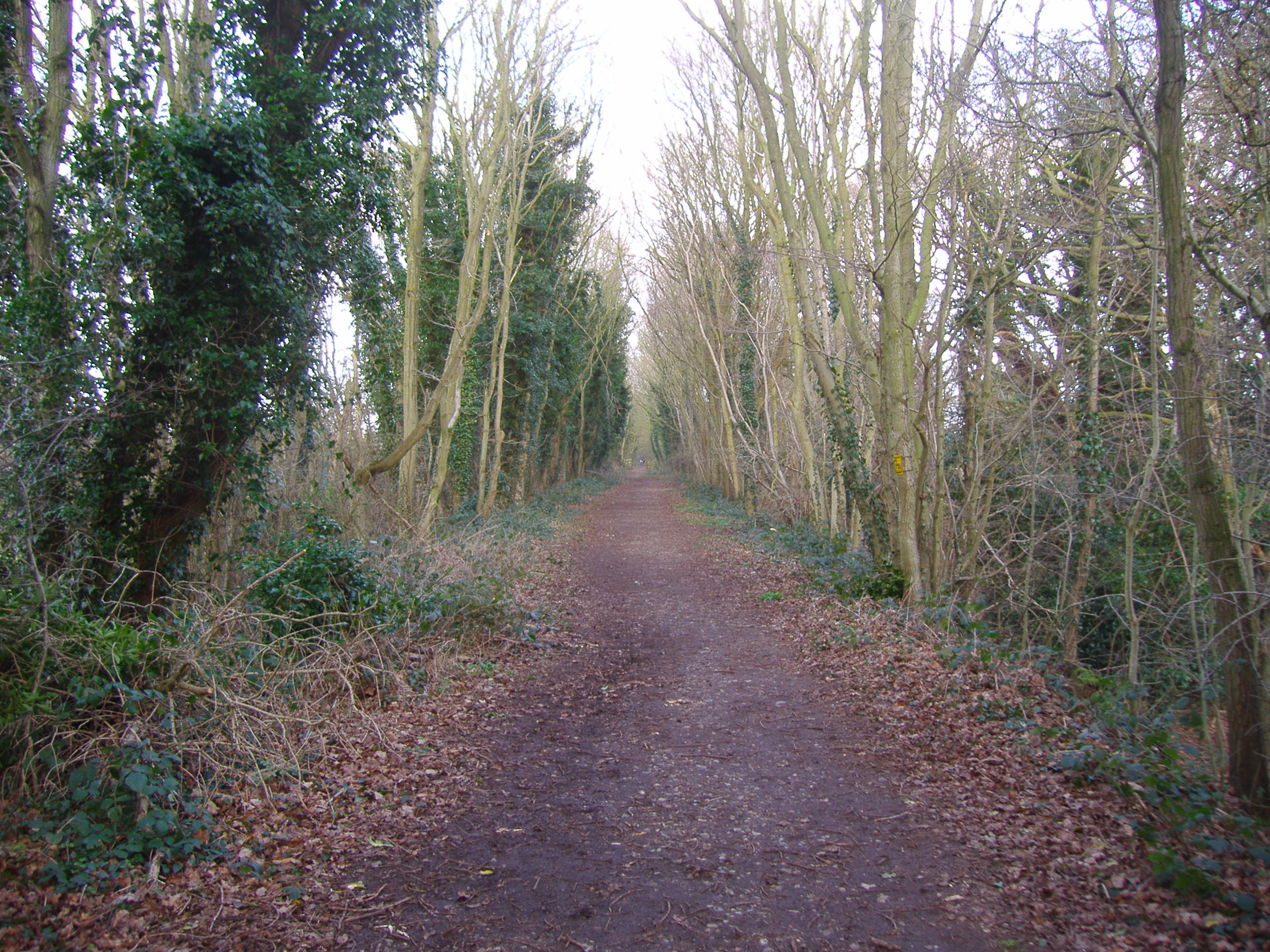
Knapton Cutting

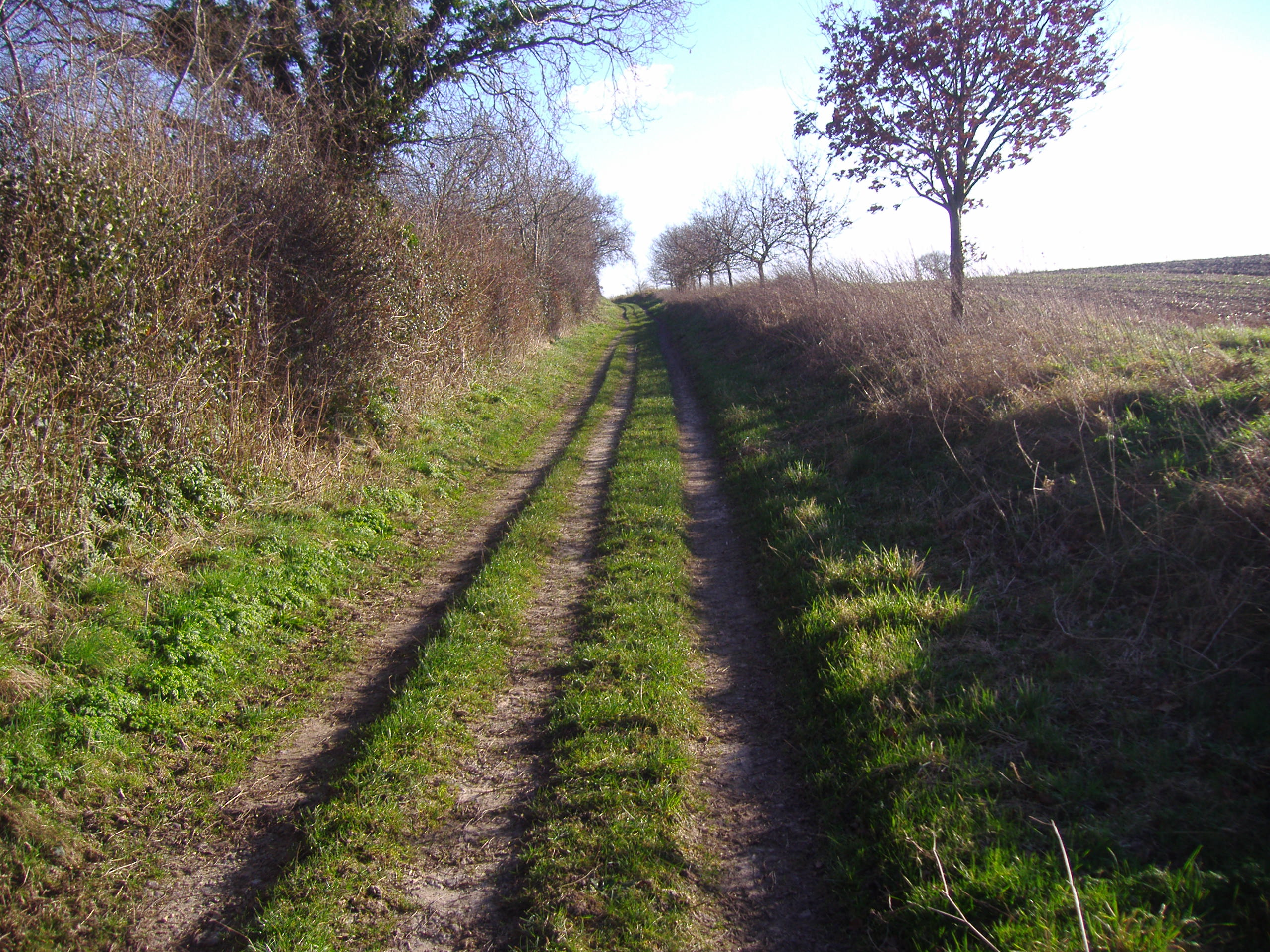
Between Northrepps and Southrepps

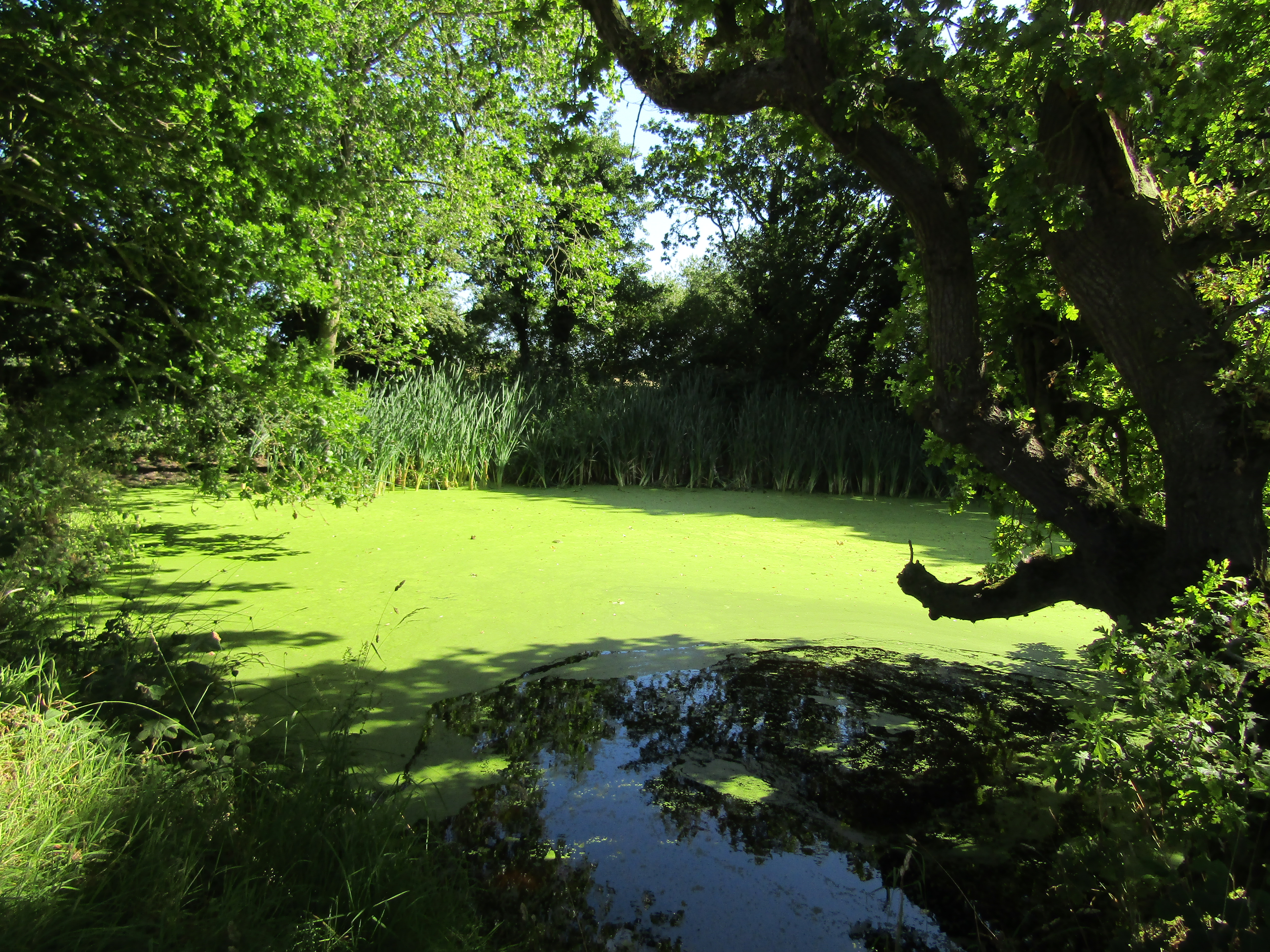
The Shrieking Pit on Sandy Lane, Hungary Hill
