= Knettishall Heath =

Nature reserve in Suffolk, England

Coordinates: 52.388°N 0.867°E

- Site of Special Scientific Interest
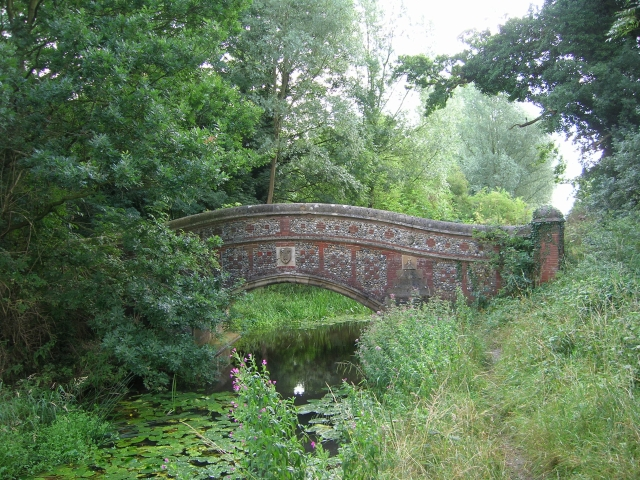
- Location of Knettishall Heath.
- Area of search: Suffolk
- Grid reference: TL 951 804
- Interest: Biological
- Area: 91.7 hectares
- Notification date: 1984
- Location map: Magic Map

Knettishall Heath is a 91.7-hectare (227-acre) biological Site of Special Scientific Interest west of Knettishall in Suffolk, England. A larger area of 176 hectares is the Knettishall Heath Nature Reserve, which is managed by the Suffolk Wildlife Trust.

Despite its name, Knettishall Heath is in fact a diverse mosaic of habitats with woodland and riverside meadows, as well as large areas of heath.

== Ecology ==
The site is heath and grassland, mainly on acidic soils, with areas of secondary woodland and wet hollows. There are heathland plants, such as sheep's sorrel, tormentil, harebell, ling and heath bedstraw, while wet areas have fen vegetation, including water mint and yellow iris.

=== Rare species ===
Of the more than 12,500 species living in the Brecks, 30% are nationally rare. The heath is home to the rare grey carpet moth which is only found in Breckland, and the lunar yellow underwing moth. Seven bat species are found at Knettishall, including the nationally scarce barbastelle bat.

=== Exmoor ponies ===
In 2013, a five-year funded project to restore lowland heath at the nature reserve began. As part of this project, 19 wild Exmoor ponies have roamed and grazed the land, helping other species to thrive. The 'Vision for the Future' project was funded by the Heritage Lottery Fund and WREN - a not-for-profit organisation that offers grants for heritage and biodiversity schemes.

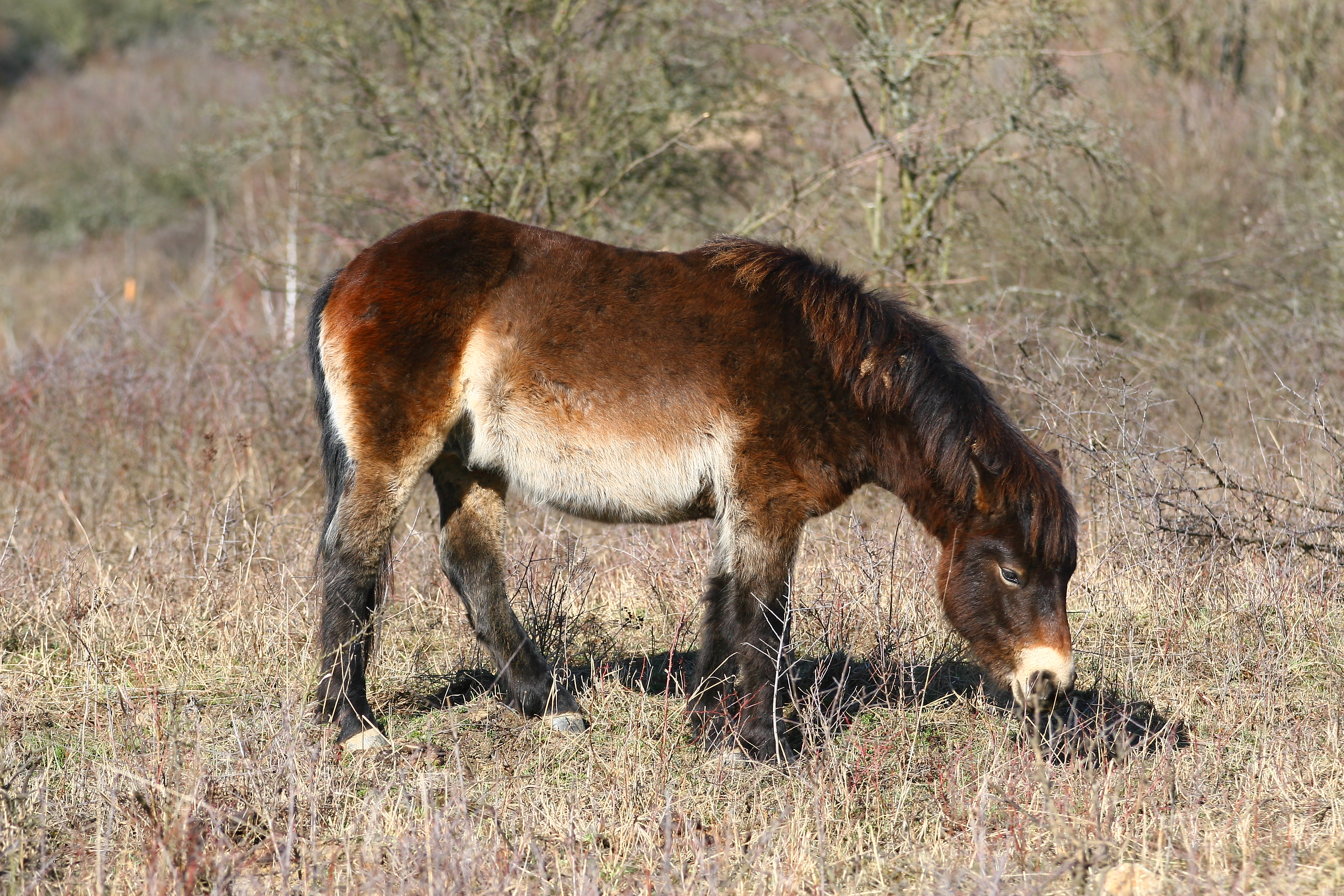
Exmoor pony grazing heath

The shrinkage of heathland has been caused partially by a decline in rabbits grazing; rabbit populations have been decimated by myxomatosis and more recently rabbit haemorrhagic disease (RHD). The addition of ponies grazing the heathland looks to reverse this shrinkage.

== Archaeology ==
An 18th-century rabbit warren and a Bronze Age burial mound at Hut Hill are evidence of thousands of years of human occupation in the area.

At the western end of the heath, ‘patterned ground’ shows evidence of the last ice age. Repeated freezing and thawing of ground created a unique mix of the sandy soil and the underlying chalk. Unusual vegetation stripes reflect the two soil types, and the different plants that grow in each.

== Footpaths ==
It is the site where four long-distance footpaths meet: Angles Way, Icknield Way, Iceni Way and Peddars Way (part of the Norfolk Coast Path, a National Trail). The Icknield Way joins with the Peddars Way at the end of its 110 miles (180 km) journey from Ivinghoe Beacon in Buckinghamshire. The Icknield Way trail, a multi-user route for walkers, horse riders and off-road cyclists also joins with the Peddars Way riders route.

The Hereward Way ends nearby in East Harling, and it linked to Knettishall Heath by path.

== Access ==
There are several access points to the heathland, most found off the road between Knettishall and Rushford villages. The main car park for the area can be found on an unnamed road (informally known as Heath Road) off Spalding's Chair Hill.

The A1066 passes within a mile or two of the heathland, where it runs from Thetford to Garboldisham.

== Land ownership ==
All land within Knettishall Heath SSSI is owned by the local authority

== Gallery ==
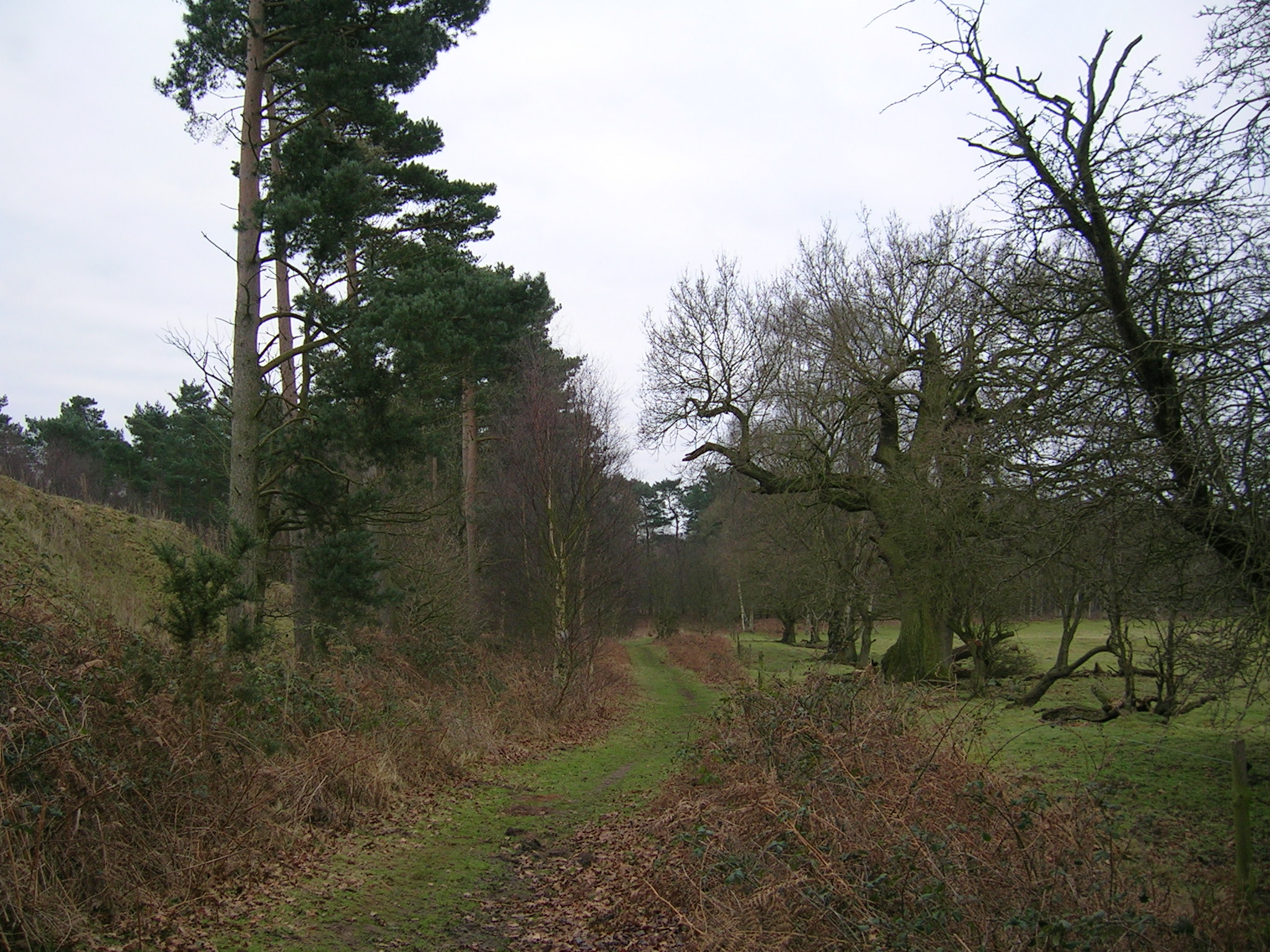
Peddars Way on the heath

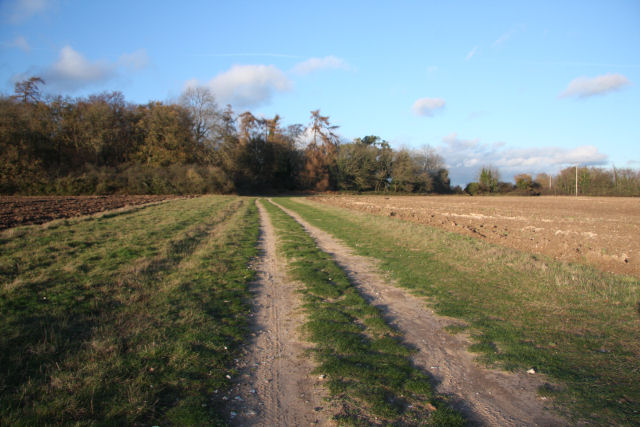
Icknield Way nearby

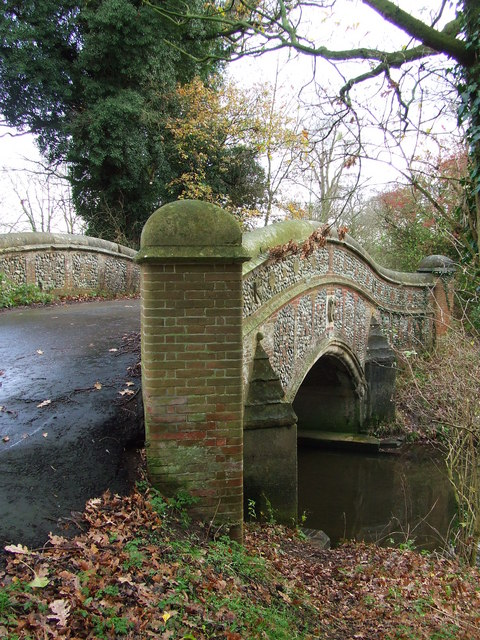
Bridge over River Little Ouse

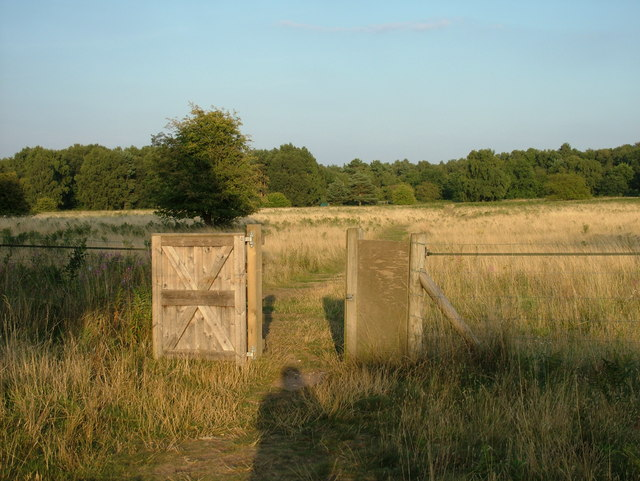
Footpath on the heath

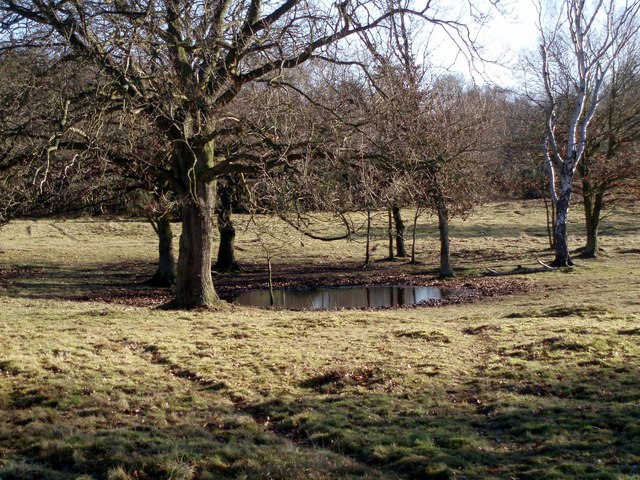
Dew Pond on Knettishall Heath

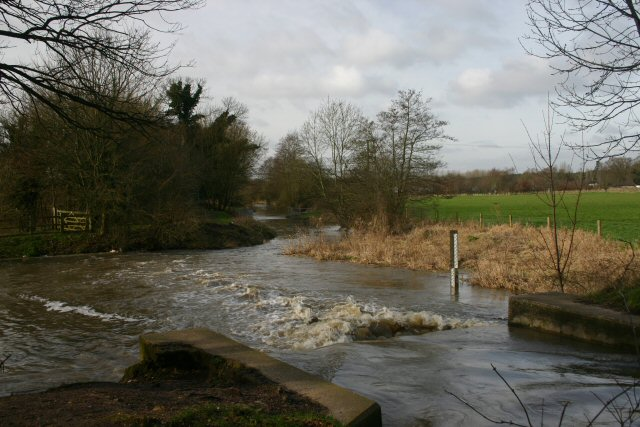
River Little Ouse

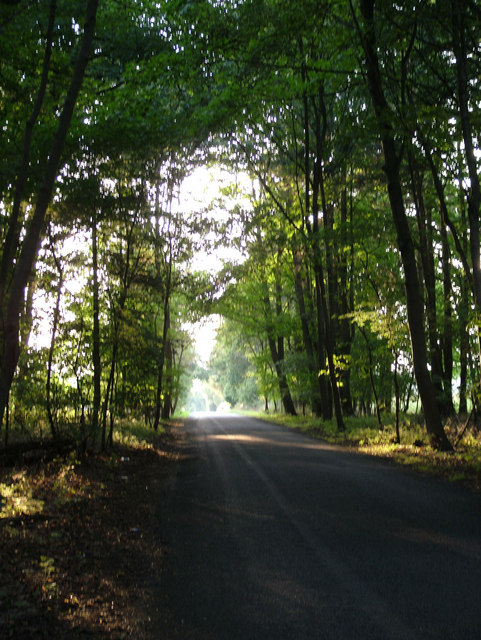
Meeting point of Icknield Way (left) and Peddars Way (right)
