= Nene Way =

110-mile footpath in eastern England

Coordinates: 52.4890°N 0.4619°W

The Nene Way
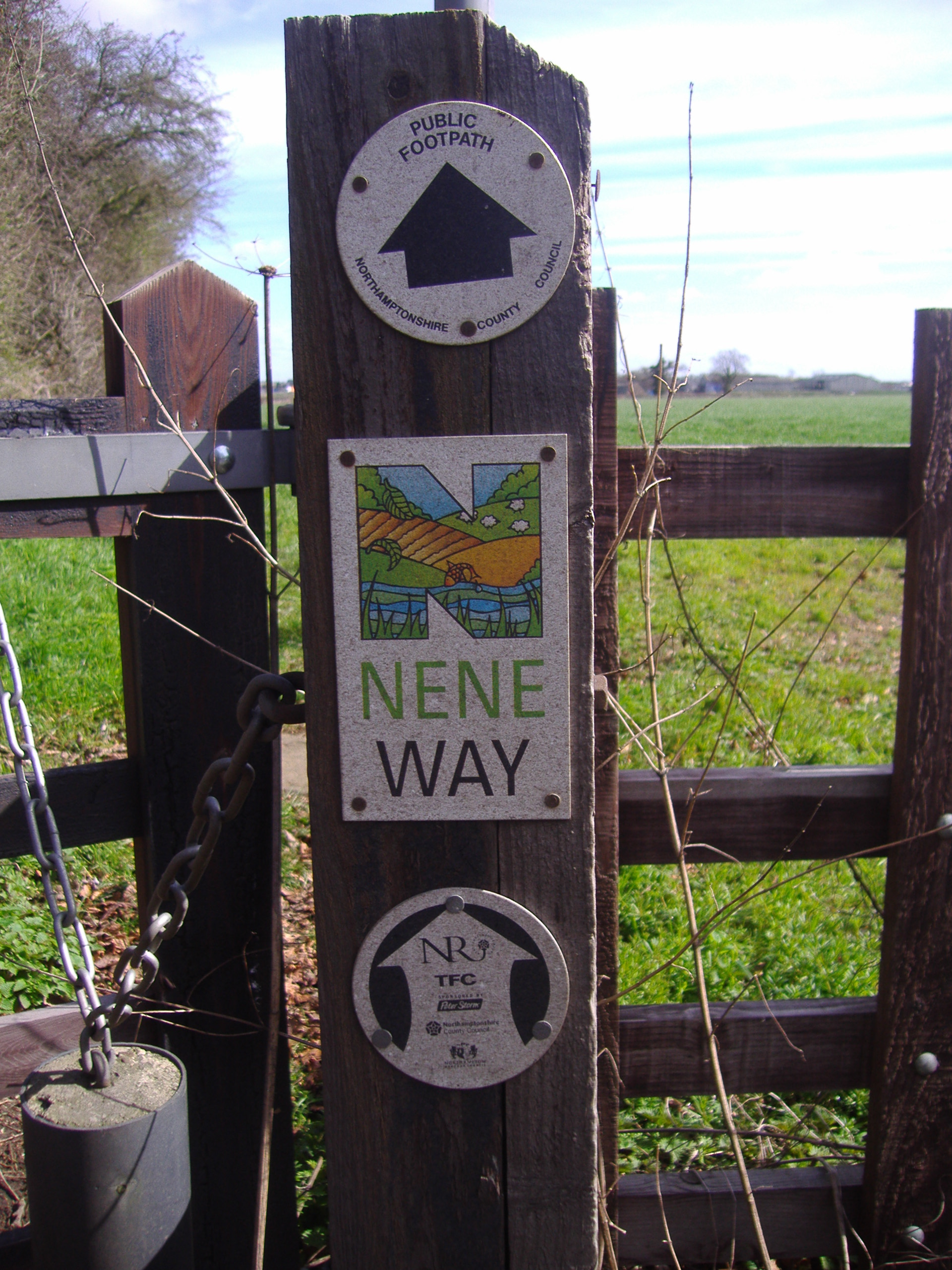
- The Nene Way route marker
- Length: 177 km (110 mi)
- Location: Northamptonshire, Cambridgeshire, and Lincolnshire
- Designation: Recreational walk
- Trailheads: Badby, Northamptonshire; Sutton Bridge, Lincolnshire
- Use: Walking
- Season: All year round
- Sights: Valley of the River Nene

The Nene Way is a waymarked long-distance footpath in England, running through the English counties of Northamptonshire, Cambridgeshire and Lincolnshire. It generally follows the course of the River Nene.

== Distance ==
The Nene Way runs for 177 kilometres (110 mi).

== The route ==
The Nene Way broadly follows the course of the River Nene and starts in Badby, Northamptonshire, ending in Sutton Bridge, Lincolnshire, passing en route through Northampton town and the city of Peterborough, the market towns of Thrapston, Oundle and Whittlesey, and villages such as Fotheringhay.

== Attractions ==
The route permits walkers to explore bluebell woods in season, wildlife havens and follow in the footsteps of Mary, Queen of Scots and the poet H.E. Bates.
