= Weavers' Way =

Footpath in Norfolk, England

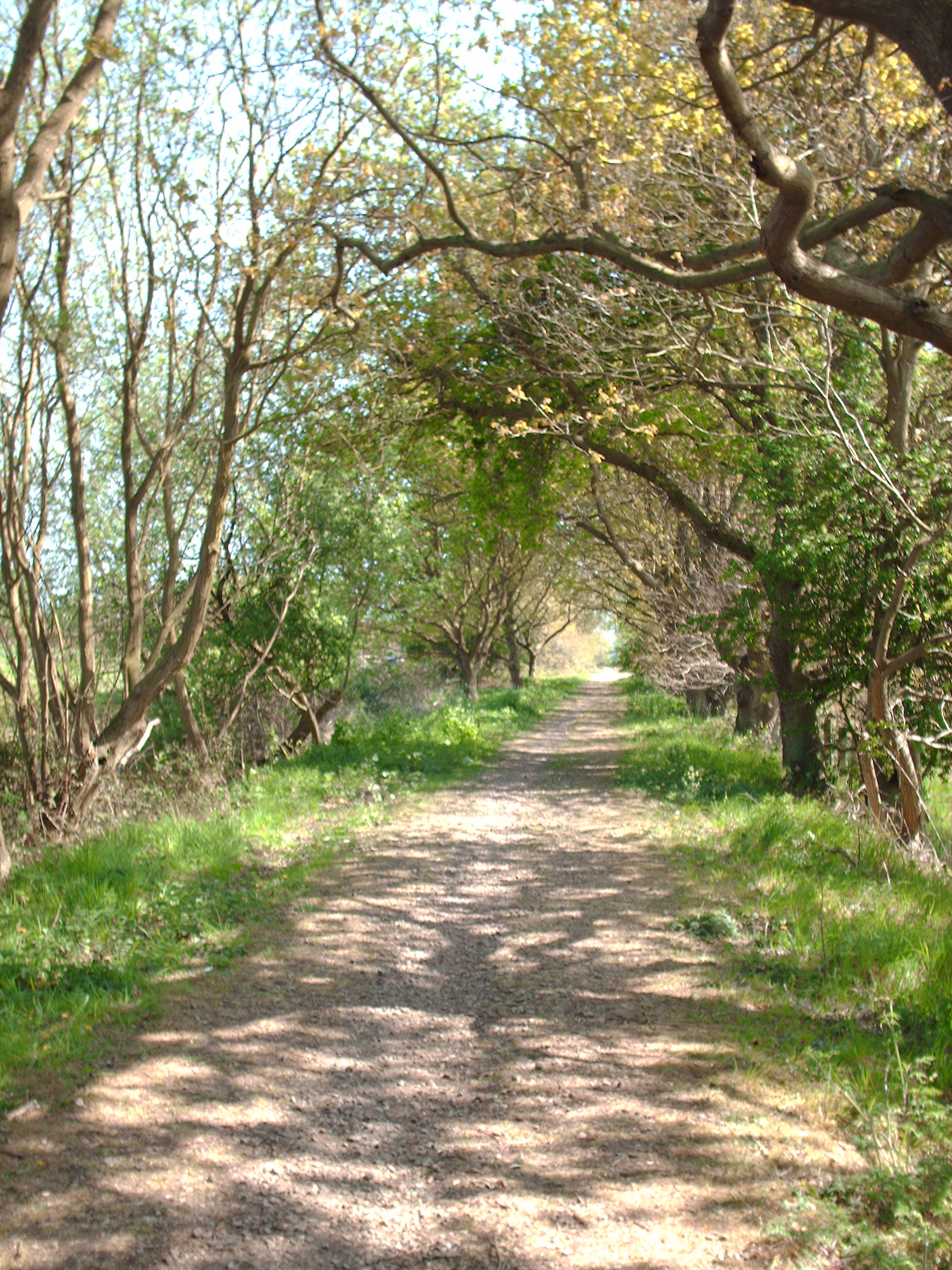
- Weavers' Way
- Length: 61 mi (98 km)
- Location: Norfolk
- Trailheads: Cromer; 52°55′58″N 1°18′03″E; Great Yarmouth; 52°36′23″N 1°44′12″E
- Use: Walking
- Highest point: 76 metres (249 ft)
- Season: All year round

The Weavers' Way is a 61-mile (98 km) long-distance footpath in Norfolk, England. Much of the Weavers' Way footpath follows the old trackbed of the Aylsham to Great Yarmouth railway line, which was operated by the Midland and Great Northern Joint Railway and was closed in 1959.

== Route ==
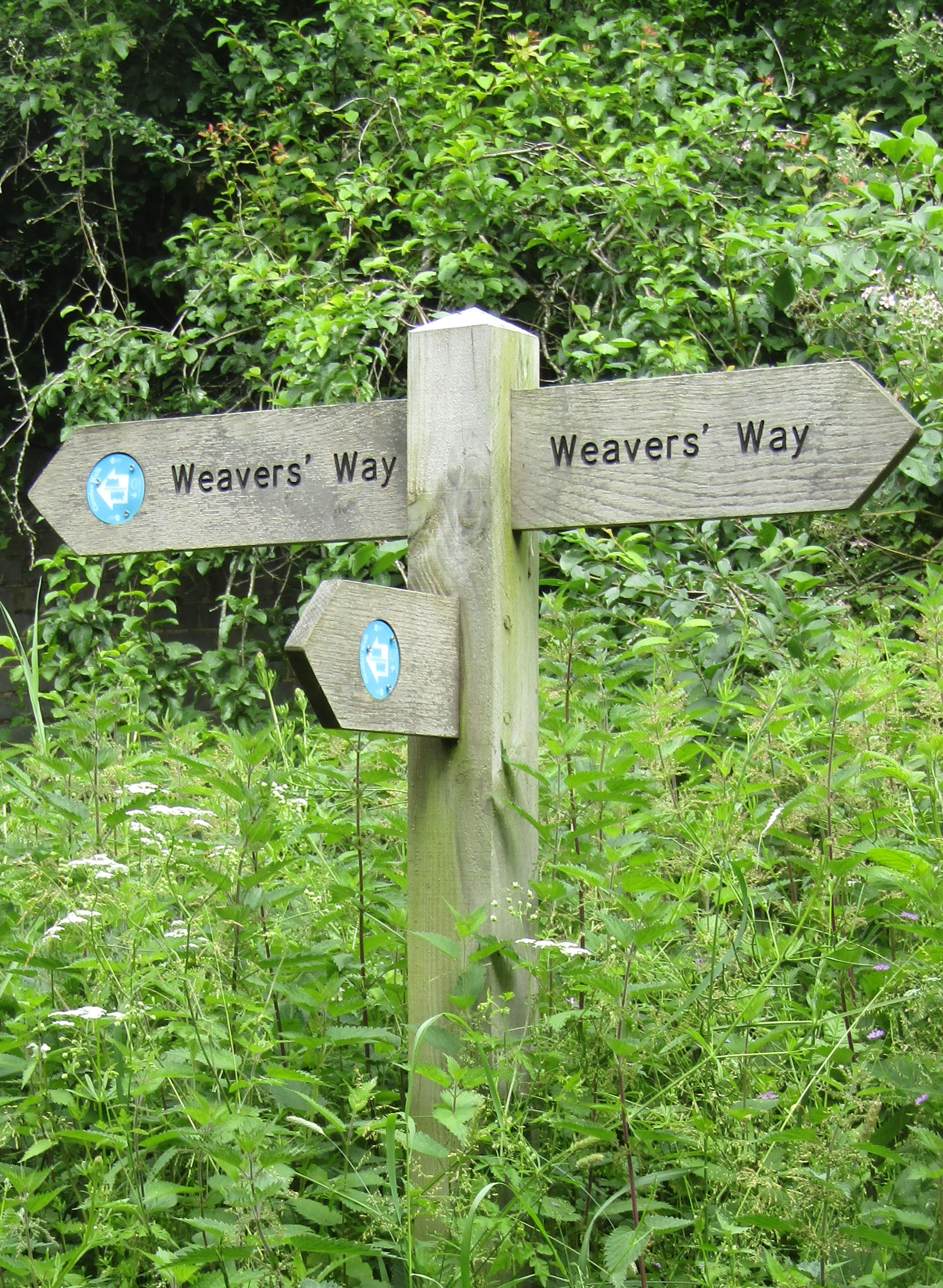
The way close to Blickling

The Weavers' Way runs from Cromer to Great Yarmouth. It passes through Hanworth, Aylsham, North Walsham, Worstead, Stalham, Potter Heigham, Thurne and Halvergate; it then crosses the marshes around Berney Arms and skirts the northern edge of Breydon Water where it shares the same route as the Wherryman's Way.

The name Weavers' Way comes from the cloth industry that was once a major industry in the area before the Industrial Revolution.

At Cromer, the Weavers' Way links with the North Norfolk Coastal Path; at Great Yarmouth, it joins the Angles Way. Together with the Peddars Way, the trails form a circuit around Norfolk.

== See also ==
- Recreational walks in Norfolk
