= Iceni Way =

Network of long-distance footpaths in Norfolk, England

Coordinates: 52.388°N 0.867°E

The Iceni Way is a collective name for several long-distance footpaths running from Knettishall Heath to Hunstanton via the Little Ouse and Great Ouse valleys in the English county of Norfolk. There are links with the Fen Rivers Way, Hereward Way, Icknield Way Path, Little Ouse Path and Nar Valley Way. The name comes from the Iceni tribe that once lived in the area.
