= Wensum Way =

Footpath in Norfolk, England

The Wensum Way
- Length: 12 mi (19 km)
- Location: Central Norfolk
- Designation: Norfolk Trails
- Trailheads: Gressenhall Farm and Workhouse museum, Lenwade
- Use: Walking
- Season: All year Round
- Website: norfolk.gov.uk

The Wensum Way is a 12-mile footpath route in Norfolk, UK, which opened in Spring 2013. It links the Nar Valley Way at Gressenhall Farm and Workhouse museum to the Marriott's Way at Lenwade.

The route takes its name from the River Wensum, in whose valley the route lies. The Norfolk County Council has hidden geocaches along the trail, which passes through 26 county wildlife areas and four Sites of Special Scientific Interest. The route forms part of the Norfolk Trails network.

== See also ==
- Official Norfolk Trails website
- Recreational walks in Norfolk
