= Holme Dunes =

Nature reserve near Holme-next-the-Sea in Norfolk, England

Coordinates: 52.974°N 0.551°E

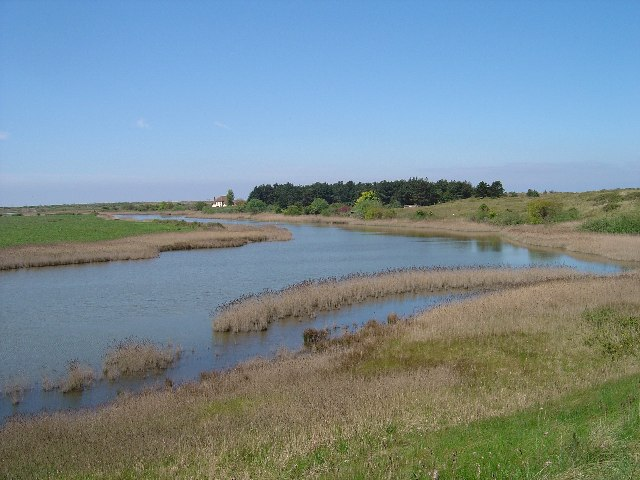
- Broadwater, a freshwater lake
- Interactive map of Holme Dunes
- Type: Nature reserve
- Location: Holme-next-the-Sea, Norfolk
- Area: 192 hectares (470 acres)
- Manager: Norfolk Wildlife Trust

Holme Dunes is a 192-hectare (470-acre) nature reserve near Holme-next-the-Sea in Norfolk. It is managed by the Norfolk Wildlife Trust, and is a National Nature Reserve. It is part of the North Norfolk Coast Site of Special Scientific Interest, Geological Conservation Review site, Nature Conservation Review site, Grade I, Ramsar site, Special Areas of Conservation and Special Protection Area. It is also in the Norfolk Coast Area of Outstanding Natural Beauty.

The reserve's sand dunes, salt marsh, pasture and pools are important for breeding birds like pied avocet, and wintering ducks, geese and waders. There are a range of coastal habitats including, freshwater pools, grazing marsh and saltmarsh. Much of the site consists of natural habitats maintained largely by coastal processes. In 2024 the rare species of fly Schroederella iners was identified at Holme Dunes, having last been recorded in the UK in 1910. In 2019 The Times named Holme Dunes as one of Top 20 'Wild' beaches in Britain.
