= Holme-next-the-Sea =

Village in Norfolk, England

Coordinates: 52.96°N 0.54°E

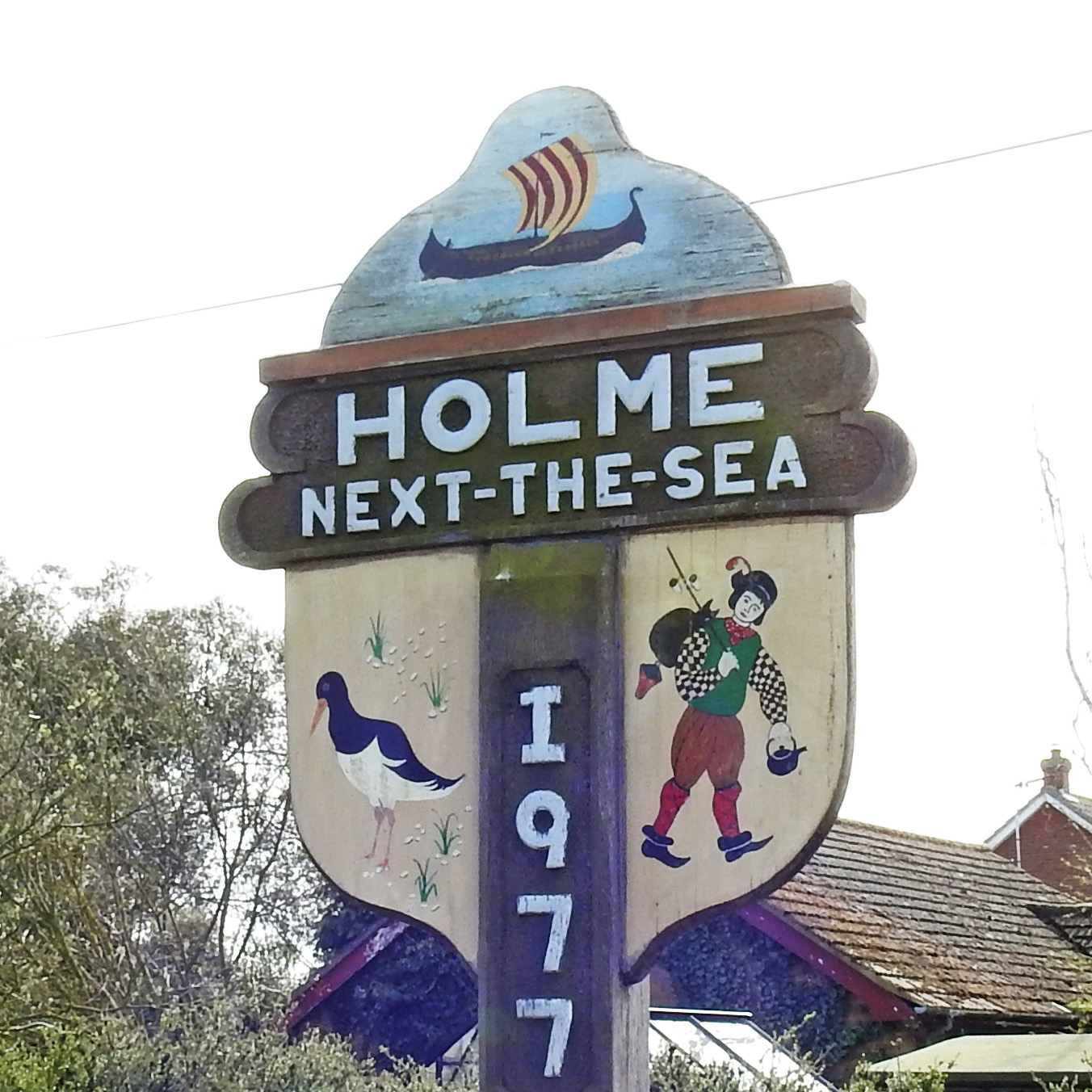
- Holme-next-the-Sea Village Sign

- Location within Norfolk
- Area: 2.90 sq mi (7.5 km^{2})
- Population: 203 (2021 census)
  - Density: 70/sq mi (27/km^{2})
- OS grid reference: TF7043
- District: King's Lynn and West Norfolk
- Shire county: Norfolk
- Region: East
- Country: England
- Sovereign state: United Kingdom
- Post town: HUNSTANTON
- Postcode district: PE36
- Dialling code: 01485
- UK Parliament: North West Norfolk

Holme-next-the-Sea is a village and civil parish in the English county of Norfolk.

Holme-next-the-Sea is located 2.5 miles (4.0 km) north-east of Hunstanton and 39 miles (63 km) north-west of Norwich.

== Correct pronunciation ==
"Holme - the 'l' is sounded"; "Holl’m"

== History ==
Holme-next-the-Sea's name is of Anglo-Saxon origin and derives from the Old English for the island next to the sea.

In the Domesday Book, Holme-next-the-Sea is recorded as a settlement of 8 households in the hundred of Smethdon. In 1086, the village was divided between the East Anglian estates of King William I and William d'Ecouis.

Seahenge, a prehistoric timber-circle, is located close to the village. The site was excavated in 1998 and the pieces were removed to the British Museum.

There are numerous post-medieval shipwrecks on the beaches near Holme, including the Vicuna which sank on 7 March 1883 whilst carrying a cargo of ice to King's Lynn Docks and the Carrington, a collier which sank in the Nineteenth Century.

During the Second World War, several defences were built in the parish to defend against a possible German invasion. These defences included anti-tank ditches, barbed wire and mine fields.

== Geography ==
According to the 2021 census, Holme-next-the-Sea has a population of 203 people which shows a decrease from the 239 people listed in the 2011 census.

Holme-next-the-Sea is a prime site for migratory birds in the autumn and is home for two adjoining nature reserves: one owned by the Norfolk Wildlife Trust and the other by the Norfolk Ornithological Association. Gore Point, the north-easterly point of The Wash, is located in the parish.

The meeting point of the Peddars Way and the Norfolk Coast Path is in the village.

== St. Mary's Church ==
Holme-next-the-Sea's parish church is dedicated to Saint Mary and dates from the Eighteenth Century. St. Mary's is located on Kirkgate and has been Grade I listed since 1953. The church holds Sunday service twice a month.

The church holds stained-glass windows and a set of royal arms from the Georgian era as well as a Nineteenth Century marble font. The church also holds a ring of five bells including one that was installed in 1677.

== Amenities ==
The eastern end of Hunstanton Golf Club reaches to Holme.

== Governance ==
Holme-next-the-Sea is part of the electoral ward of Brancaster for local elections and is part of the district of King's Lynn and West Norfolk.

The village's national constituency is North West Norfolk which has been represented by the Conservative's James Wild MP since 2019.

== War Memorial ==
Holme-next-the-Sea War Memorial is a small latin-cross monument in St. Mary's Churchyard. The memorial lists the following names for the First World War:

Rank	Name	Unit	Date of death	Burial/Commemoration
2Lt.	Frank D. Holm	Royal Engineers	14 May 1917	Doullens Cemetery
WO2	George Potter	190th Bty., Royal Garrison Artillery	29 Apr. 1918	Brandhoek New Cemetery
LSjt.	Albert Smith MM	10th Bn., Essex Regiment	22 Oct. 1917	Tyne Cot
LCpl.	Alec P. Robertson	8th (Winnipeg Rifles) Bn., CEF	28 Apr. 1915	Menin Gate
LCpl.	John L. Callaby	15th Bn., West Yorkshire Regiment	28 Jun. 1918	Cinq Rues Cemetery
Pte.	Arthur F. Robinson	1st Bn., Royal Berkshire Regiment	29 Sep. 1918	Vis-en-Artois Memorial
Pte.	Kenneth A. Robertson	8th Bn., Royal Fusiliers	5 May 1917	Arras Memorial
Pte.	Alfred Potter	2nd Bn., Middlesex Regiment	24 Oct. 1918	Niederzwehren Cemetery
Pte.	Alfred Thacker	1st Bn., Queen's Own Royal Regt.	22 Jul. 1916	Caterpillar Valley Cemetery
Pte.	Percy C. Rason	6th Bn., Queen's Royal Regiment	5 Apr. 1917	Faubourg Cemetery
Spr.	Frederick N. Knight	1st Tunnelling Coy., AIF	4 Nov. 1918	Prémont British Cemetery
Spr.	George B. Callaby	97th Coy., Royal Engineers	1 Apr. 1918	Le Cateau Cemetery

The following names were added after the Second World War:

Rank	Name	Unit	Date of death	Burial/Commemoration
FSgt.	Michael J. T. Finn	No. 620 Squadron RAF (Stirlings)	6 Sep. 1943	Altdorf Cemetery
Sgt.	John A. Rix	No. 49 Squadron RAF (Lancasters)	2 Nov. 1944	Rheinberg War Cemetery
Pte.	William E. Hayter	Royal Army Ordnance Corps	26 Apr. 1941	Athens War Memorial
Pte.	Harold J. Arnold	7th Bn., Royal Norfolk Regiment	12 Jun. 1940	Dunkirk Memorial
