= Angles Way =

Long-distance footpath in England

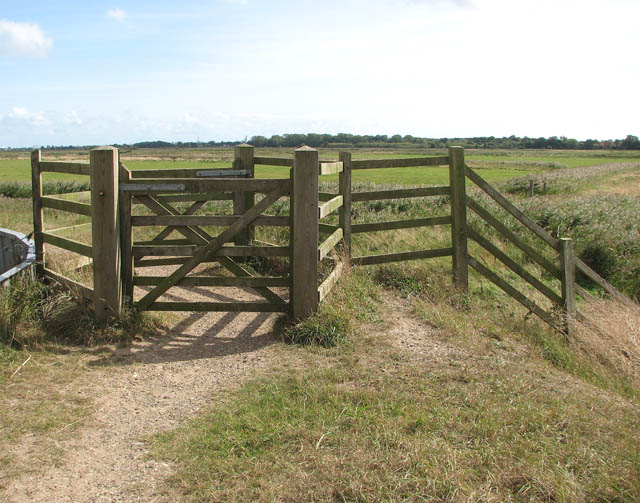
- Length: 148 km (92 mi)
- Location: England
- Designation: Norfolk Trail
- Trailheads: Great Yarmouth; 52.6123°N 1.7211°E; Barnhamcross Common, Thetford; 52.405764°N 0.748474°E
- Use: Hiking

The Angles Way is a long-distance footpath in England, close to the River Waveney and River Little Ouse and thus close to the Norfolk/Suffolk border between Great Yarmouth and Thetford.

Originally the Angles Way went only as far as Knettishall Heath, but a section of some 15 miles (24 km) onwards to Thetford, once described as the Angles Way Link, is now regarded as part of the Angles Way itself. It is and signed as such at Thetford a swell as described this way on the website of Norfolk County Council who maintains the route .

The route may be conveniently divided into eight stages:

1. Great Yarmouth to Fritton Lake, via Breydon Water and Burgh Castle.
2. Fritton Lake to Oulton Broad.
3. Oulton Broad to Beccles.
4. Beccles to Bungay.
5. Bungay to Harleston.
6. Harleston to Diss, passing near Hoxne.
7. Diss to Knettishall Heath, via Redgrave and Lopham Fen and Blo' Norton and Thelnetham Fen
8. Knettishall Heath to Thetford.

Each end of the footpath may be accessed from railway stations, with several more railway stations between Great Yarmouth and Beccles, and a regular bus service runs along the A143 road, enabling walkers of the path to make use of public transport.

The Angles Way connects with the Peddars Way and Icknield Way Path at Knettishall Heath, and the St Edmund's Way near Thetford, allowing longer walks to be undertaken.

Angles Way was voted the best waterside walk in Britain by waterscape.com in 2003. However, though the route broadly follows the River Waveney and River Little Ouse, only the section from Great Yarmouth to Beccles is a waterside walk. Almost all of the rest of the route merely lies in the vicinity of the rivers.
