= Norfolk Coast Path =

Long-distance footpath in Norfolk, England

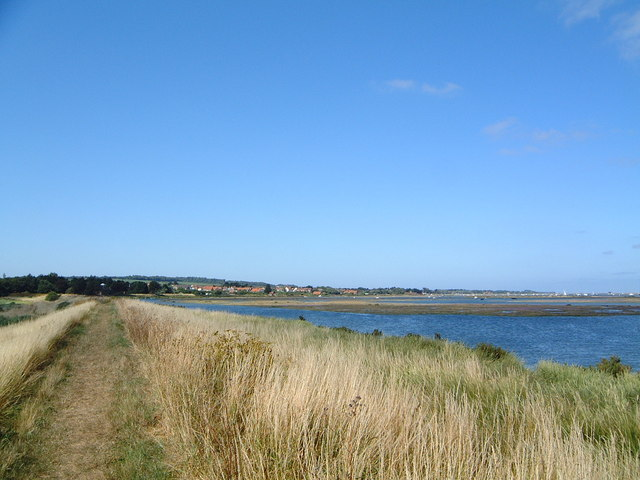
- At Burnham Deepdale
- Length: 133.5 km (83.0 mi)
- Location: North Norfolk, England
- Designation: UK National Trail
- Trailheads: Hunstanton; 52.9396°N 0.4873°E; Hopton-on-Sea; 52.5362°N 1.7378°E
- Use: Walking
- Highest point: Beeston Bump, 63 m (207 ft)
- Lowest point: Holme-next-the-Sea
- Season: All year round
- Hazards: Cliff erosion

The Norfolk Coast Path is a long-distance footpath in Norfolk, with a length of 112 miles (180 km) from Sutton Bridge to Hopton-on-Sea. It was opened in 1986 and runs through the Norfolk Coast National Landscape. It is now part of the King Charles III England Coast Path.

It links with the Peddars Way at Holme-next-the-Sea, and the two in combination form the Peddars Way & Norfolk Coast Path National Trail, one of 15 National Trails in England and Wales. It links to the Angles Way and the Wherryman's Way at Great Yarmouth, and to both ends of the Weavers' Way, at Cromer and Great Yarmouth. In December 2014, the trail was extended to Sea Palling and forms part of the England Coast Path. In October 2016, the trail was further extended to Hopton-on-Sea. In 2024 it was extended further to reach Sutton Bridge in the west.

The Norfolk Coast Path passes through or near:

- Sutton Bridge
- Snettisham
- Hunstanton
- Holme-next-the-Sea
- Thornham
- Titchwell
- Brancaster
- Burnham Deepdale
- Burnham Overy Staithe
- Wells-next-the-Sea
- Morston
- Blakeney
- Cley next the Sea
- Salthouse
- Kelling
- Weybourne
- Sheringham
- Beeston Regis
- East Runton
- Cromer
- Overstrand
- Sidestrand
- Trimingham
- Mundesley
- Bacton
- Walcott
- Happisburgh
- Eccles-on-Sea
- Sea Palling
- Winterton-on-Sea
- Hemsby
- Scratby
- Caister-on-Sea
- Great Yarmouth
- Gorleston-on-Sea
- Hopton-on-Sea

== See also ==
- Recreational walks in Norfolk
