= National Trails =

Long-distance trails in England and Wales

National Trails are long distance footpaths and bridleways in England and Wales. They are administered by Natural England, an agency of the UK government, and Natural Resources Wales, a Welsh government-sponsored body. National Trails are marked with an acorn symbol along the route and are marked on Ordnance Survey maps. In Scotland, the equivalent trails are called Scotland's Great Trails and are administered by NatureScot.

The majority of long-distance footpaths in the United Kingdom are not designated as National Trails, but are instead described and way-marked by other public bodies, by local authorities, or by private association or individuals. Some of these are also marked on Ordnance Survey maps.

== List of National Trails ==
- Cleveland Way in England
- Coast to Coast Path in England
- Cotswold Way in England
- Glyndŵr's Way in Wales
- Hadrian's Wall Path in England
- King Charles III England Coast Path around England (80% complete when officially opened in March 2026)
- North Downs Way in England
- Offa's Dyke Path in Wales and England
- Peddar's Way and Norfolk Coast Path in England (treated as a single National Trail)
- Pembrokeshire Coast Path in Wales
- Pennine Bridleway in England (bridleway)
- Pennine Way mainly in England with a short distance in Scotland
- The Ridgeway in England (mostly bridleway/restricted byway/byway)
- South Downs Way in England (bridleway)
- South West Coast Path (South West Way) in England—the UK's longest
- Thames Path in England
- Yorkshire Wolds Way in England

== See also ==
- List of long-distance footpaths in the United Kingdom
