= Peddars Way =

Long-distance footpath in England

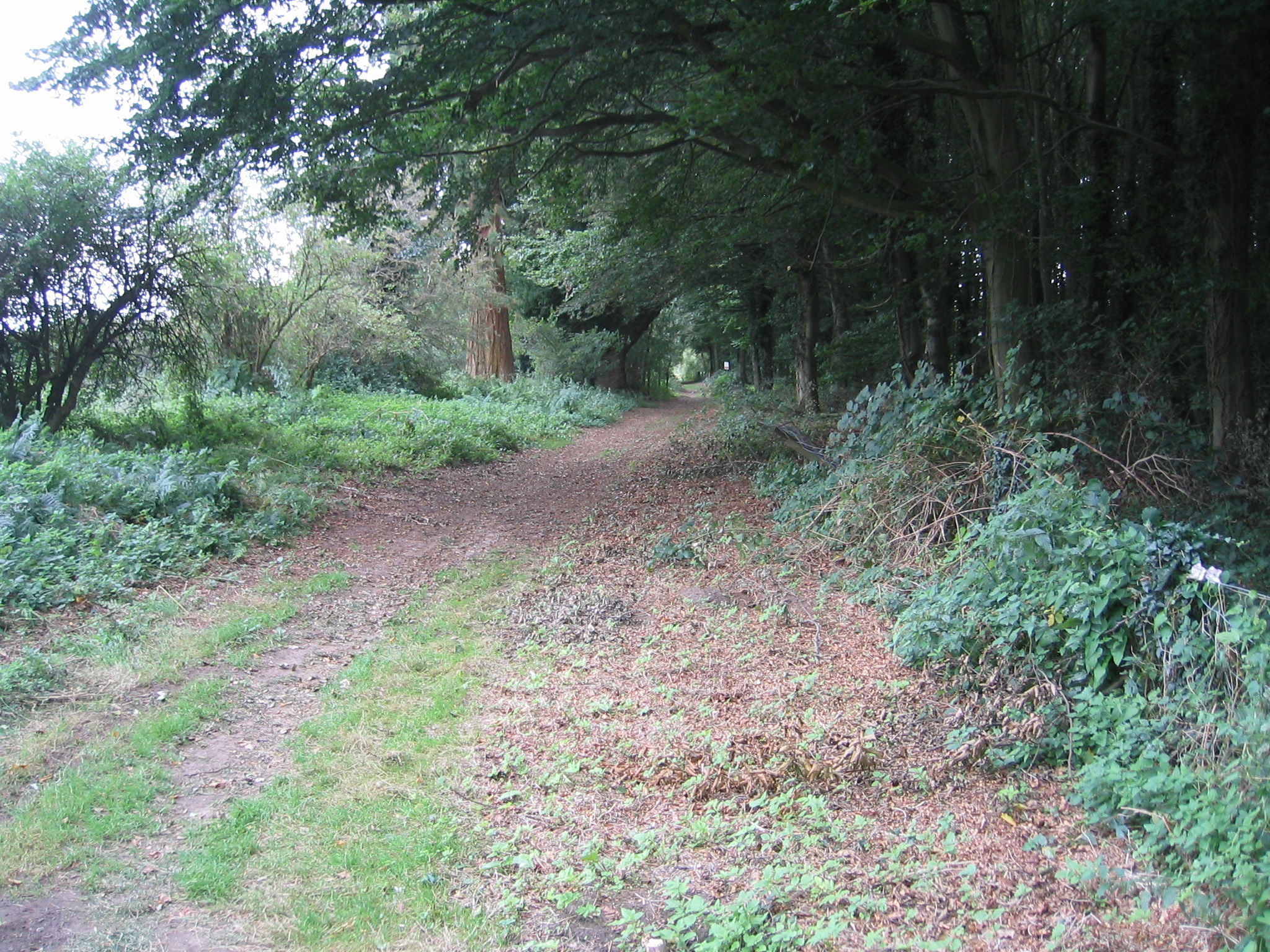
- Peddars Way near Thompson
- Length: 74 km (46 mi)
- Location: Suffolk and Norfolk
- Designation: UK National Trail
- Trailheads: Knettishall (near Thetford); 52.3906°N 0.8549°E; Holme-next-the-Sea; 52.9629°N 0.5281°E
- Use: Walking
- Lowest point: Holme-next-the-Sea
- Difficulty: Easy
- Season: All year round

The Peddars Way is a long distance footpath that passes through Suffolk and Norfolk, England.

== Route ==
The Peddars Way is 46 miles (74 km) long and follows the route of a Roman road. It has been suggested by more than one writer that it was not created by the Romans but was an ancient trackway, a branch or extension of the Icknield Way, used and remodelled by the Romans. The name-type, which recurs in medieval records from other parts of East Anglia, derives from Middle English pedder, meaning an itinerant trader. It is first mentioned on a map of 1587 AD. It starts at Knettishall Heath in Suffolk (near the Norfolk-Suffolk border, about 7 km or 4 mi east of Thetford), and it links with the Norfolk Coast Path at Holme-next-the-Sea.

Combined with the Norfolk Coast Path, it forms the Peddars Way & Norfolk Coast Path National Trail, one of 15 National Trails in England and Wales, and the two paths together run for 133 miles (214 km).

It is one of four long distance footpaths which, when combined, run from Lyme Regis to Hunstanton and are referred to as the Greater Ridgeway. At Knettishall Heath the Peddars Way links with the Icknield Way Path for 110 miles south west to Ivinghoe Beacon in Buckinghamshire.

== Guide and waymarks ==
A detailed 144-page guide, including 1:25,000 maps from the Ordnance Survey, and described south to north, is published in the series of National Trail Guides. The trail is very well marked with two general types of waymarker along the length of the route. At junctions there are signs marked 'Peddars Way' on plain wood fingerposts. Elsewhere white, yellow and green discs are used bearing the acorn sign used on such long-distance routes.

== Public transport ==
The Peddars Way may be accessed by public transport. There is a path linking the southern end, at Knettishall Heath, to the nearby Harling Road railway station. Holme, at the northern end, has a regular bus service to King's Lynn and Hunstanton. Holme also has a regular bus service to Sheringham. Both King's Lynn and Sheringham allow onward connections using their regular rail services.

== Folklore ==
The Peddars Way was traditionally supposed to be a haunt of the ghostly East Anglian hound Black Shuck.

== Gallery ==
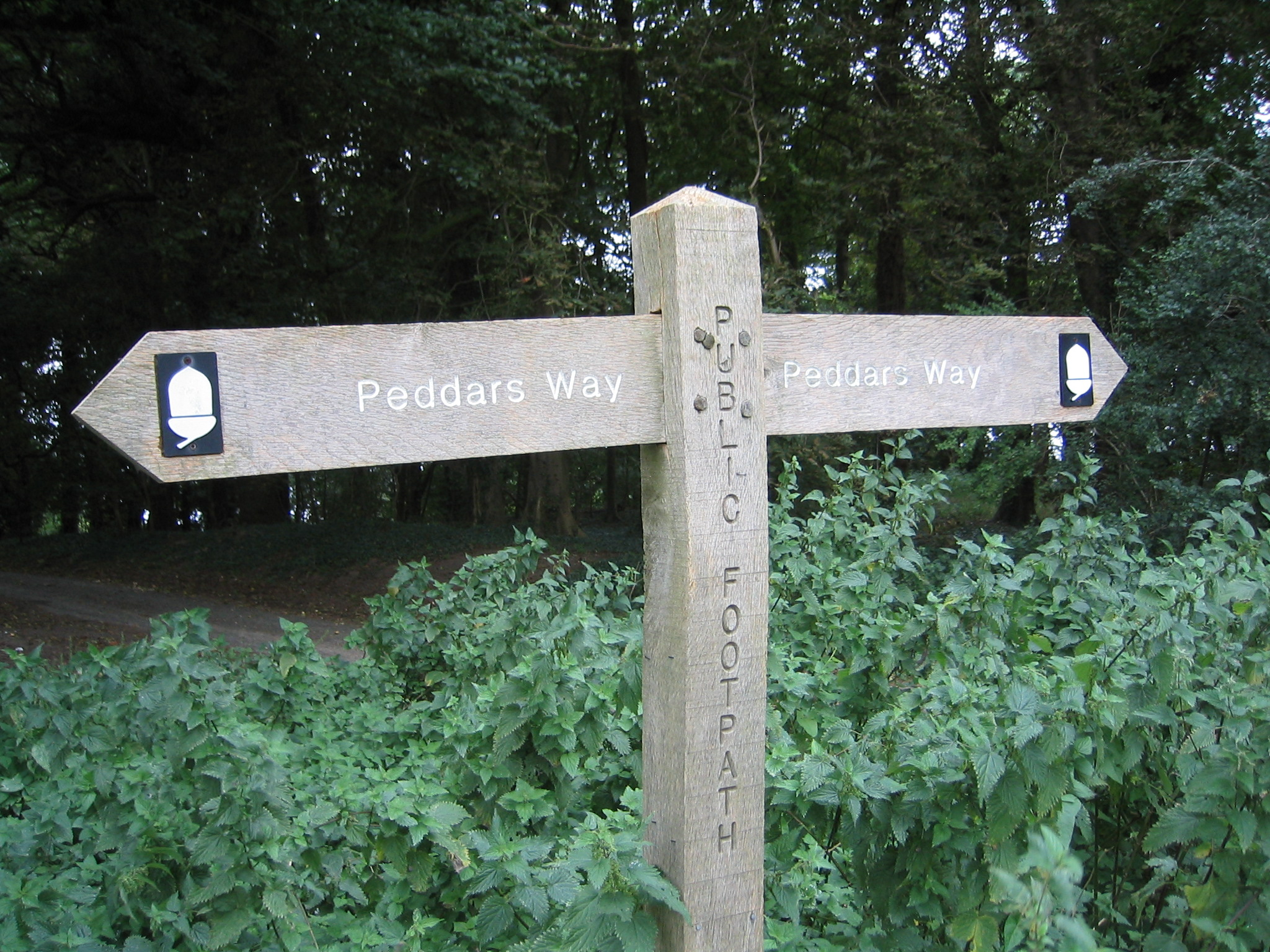
Peddars Way signpost

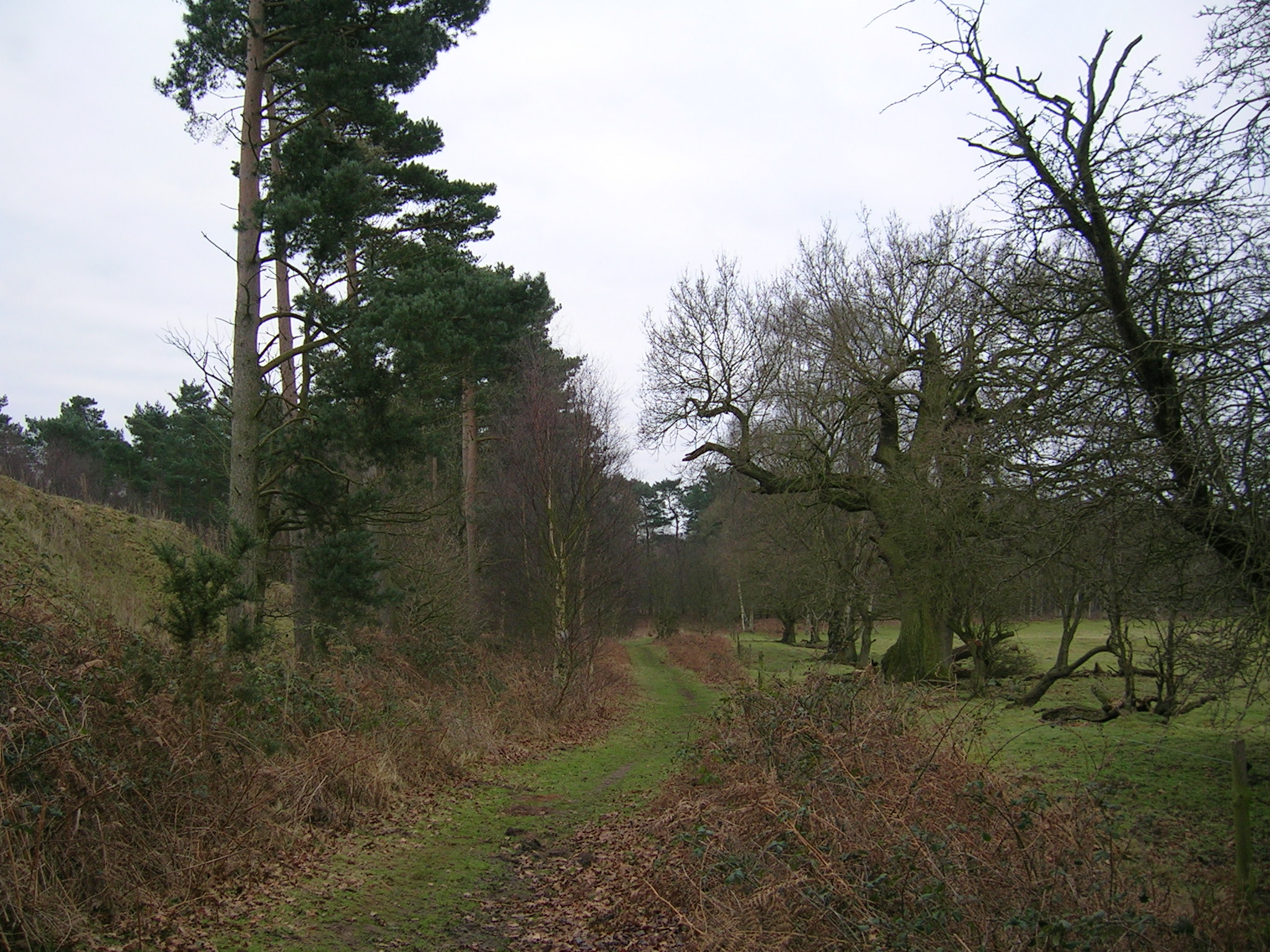
Knettishall Heath

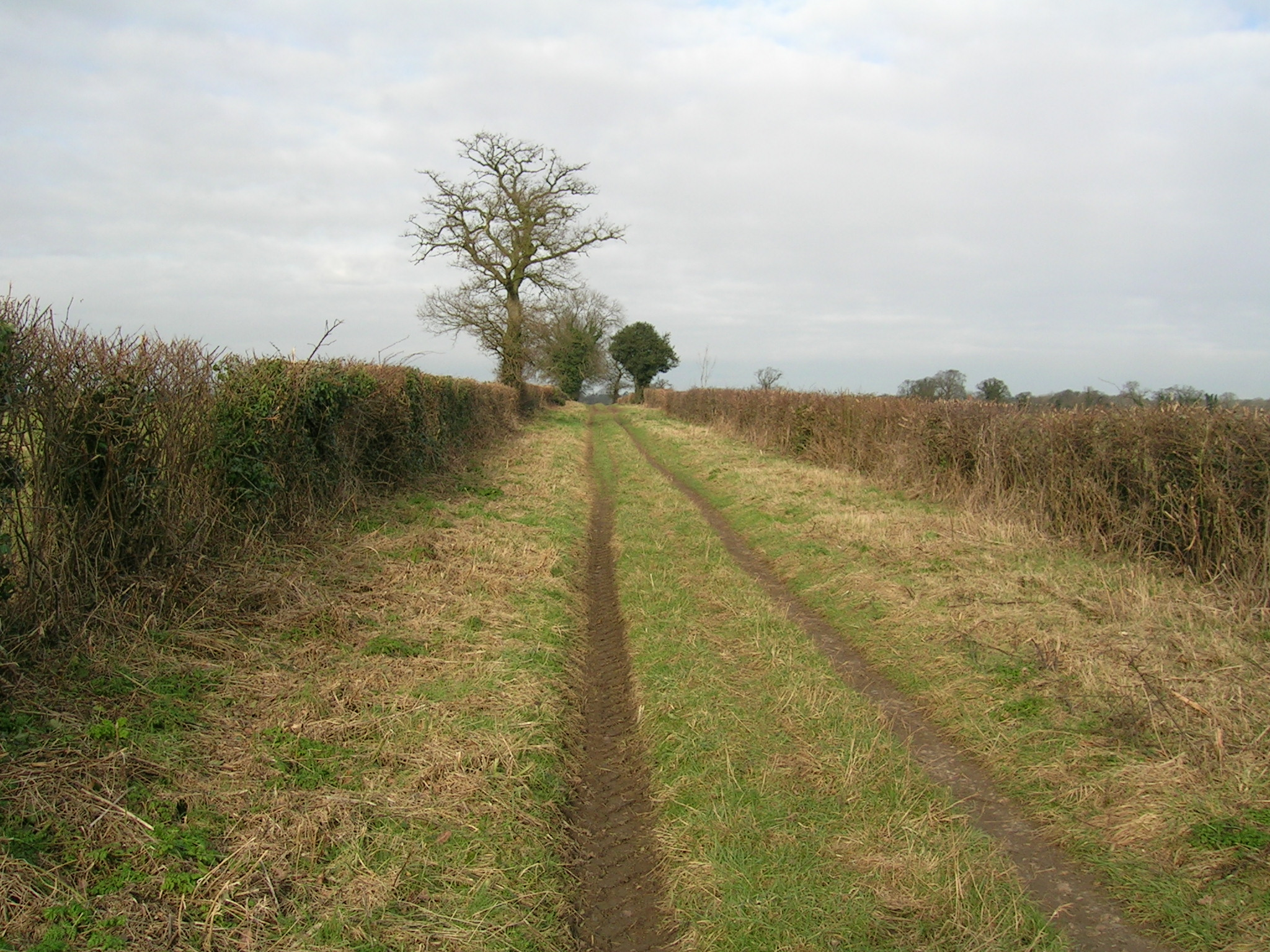
near Little Cressingham

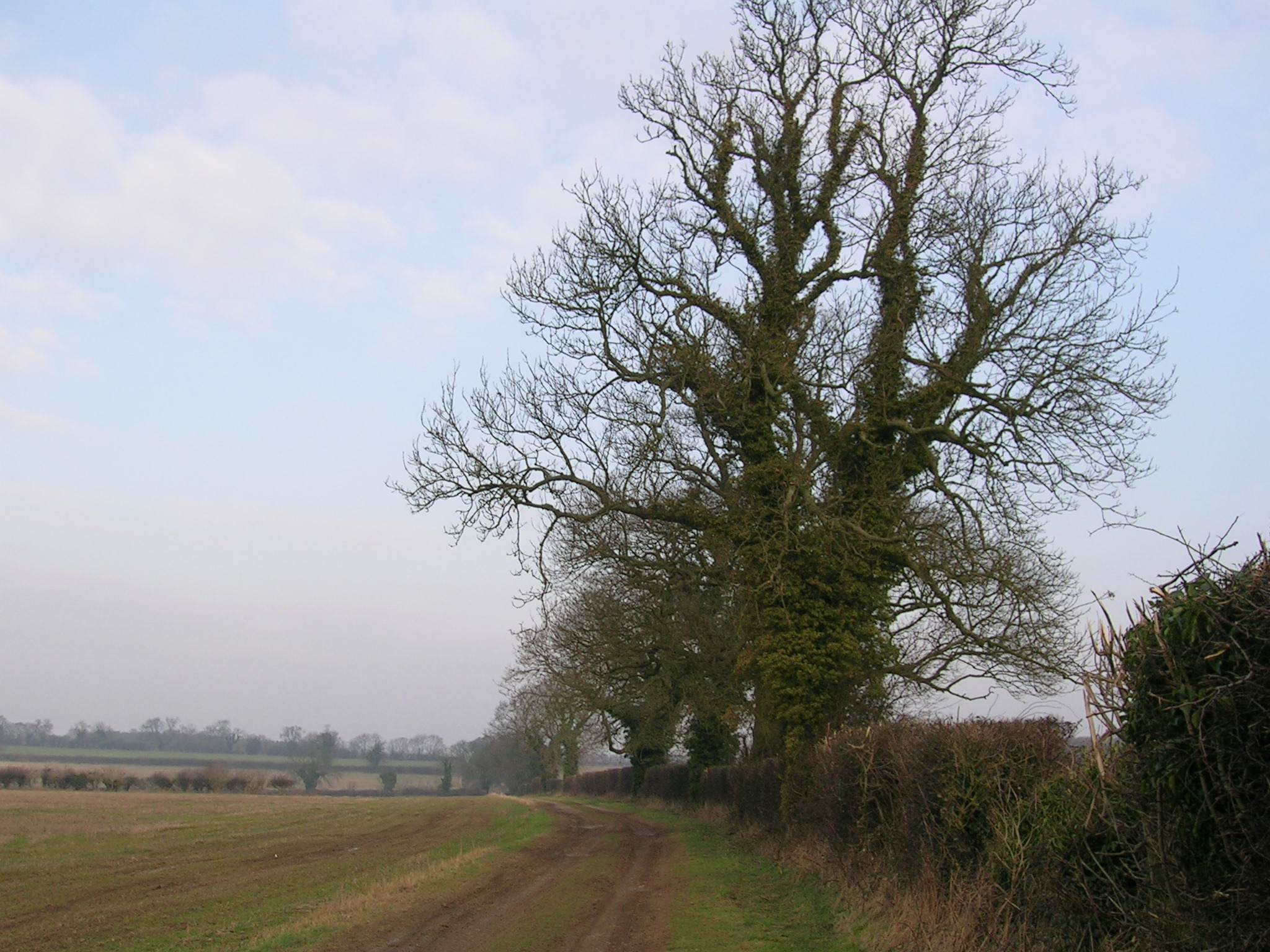
Massingham Heath

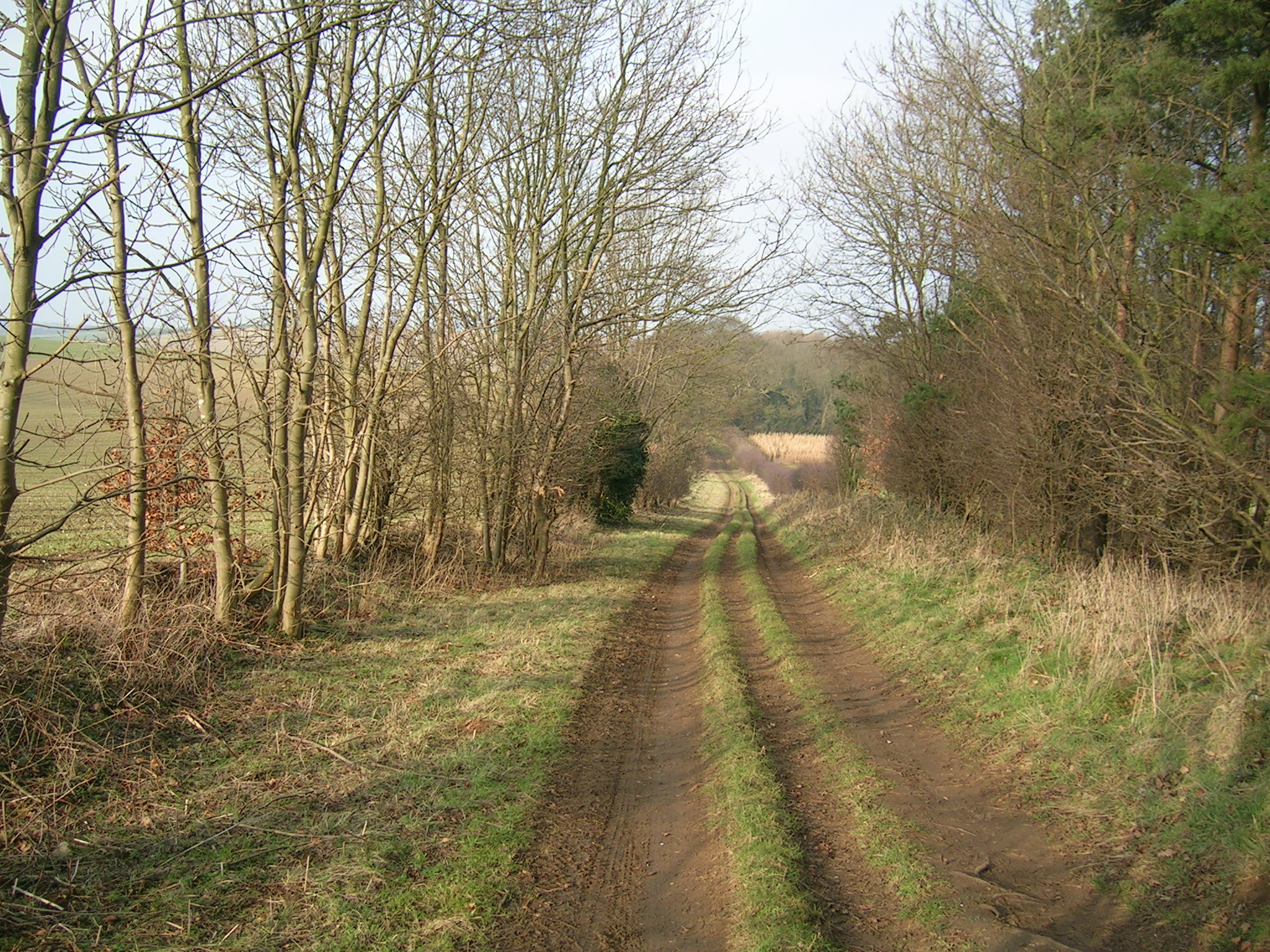
near Fring

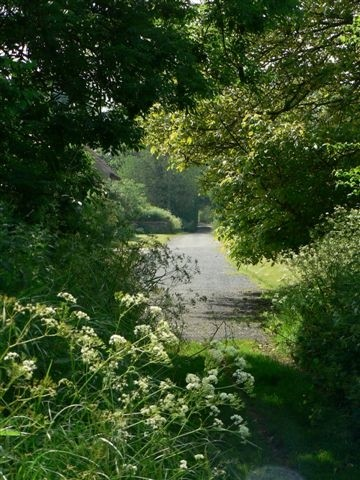
by Magazine Wood, Sedgeford

== See also ==
- Long-distance footpaths in the UK
- Recreational walks in Norfolk
- Castle Acre
- Sheringham
- Beeston Regis
- River Heacham
- North Pickenham
- Slíghe Chualann
