= Paul Edward Paget =

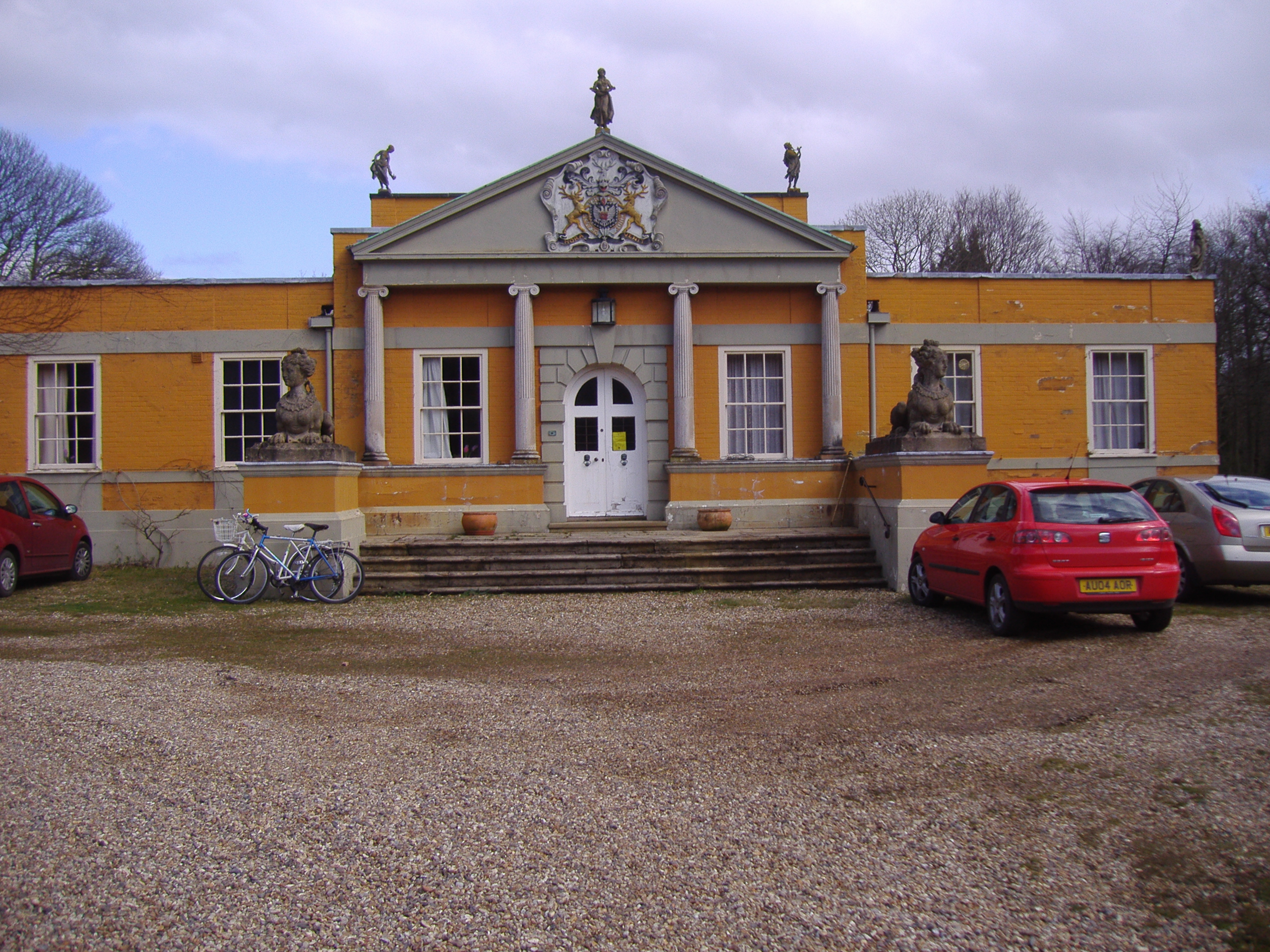
Templewood, in Frogshall, Norfolk

Paul Edward Paget CVO (24 January 1901 – 13 August 1985) was the son of Henry Luke Paget, Bishop of Chester and Elmer Katie Hoare (sister of Sir Samuel Hoare).

He became business partner of John Seely (later Lord Mottistone), whom he met at Cambridge, and in 1922 they formed the firm of Seely & Paget, in which Paget concentrated more on clients than on design work. The partners became successful designers of opulent houses in the 1920s and restored many damaged church buildings after World War II.

Paget was invested as a Fellow of the Royal Institute of British Architects (FRIBA) and a Fellow of the Society of Antiquaries (FSA). He was also a Commander, Royal Victorian Order (CVO).

After Seely's death Paget succeeded him as Surveyor of the Fabric of St Paul's Cathedral in 1963 but completed little further architectural work. He was master of the Art Workers Guild in 1971.

In August 1971, aged 70, Paget married Verily Anderson in London, England, and retired with her and her children to Templewood in Frogshall, Northrepps, Norfolk, a building he had designed for his uncle Samuel Hoare, Viscount Templewood.
