= Gimingham =

Village in Norfolk, England

Coordinates: 52.87962°N 1.39561°E

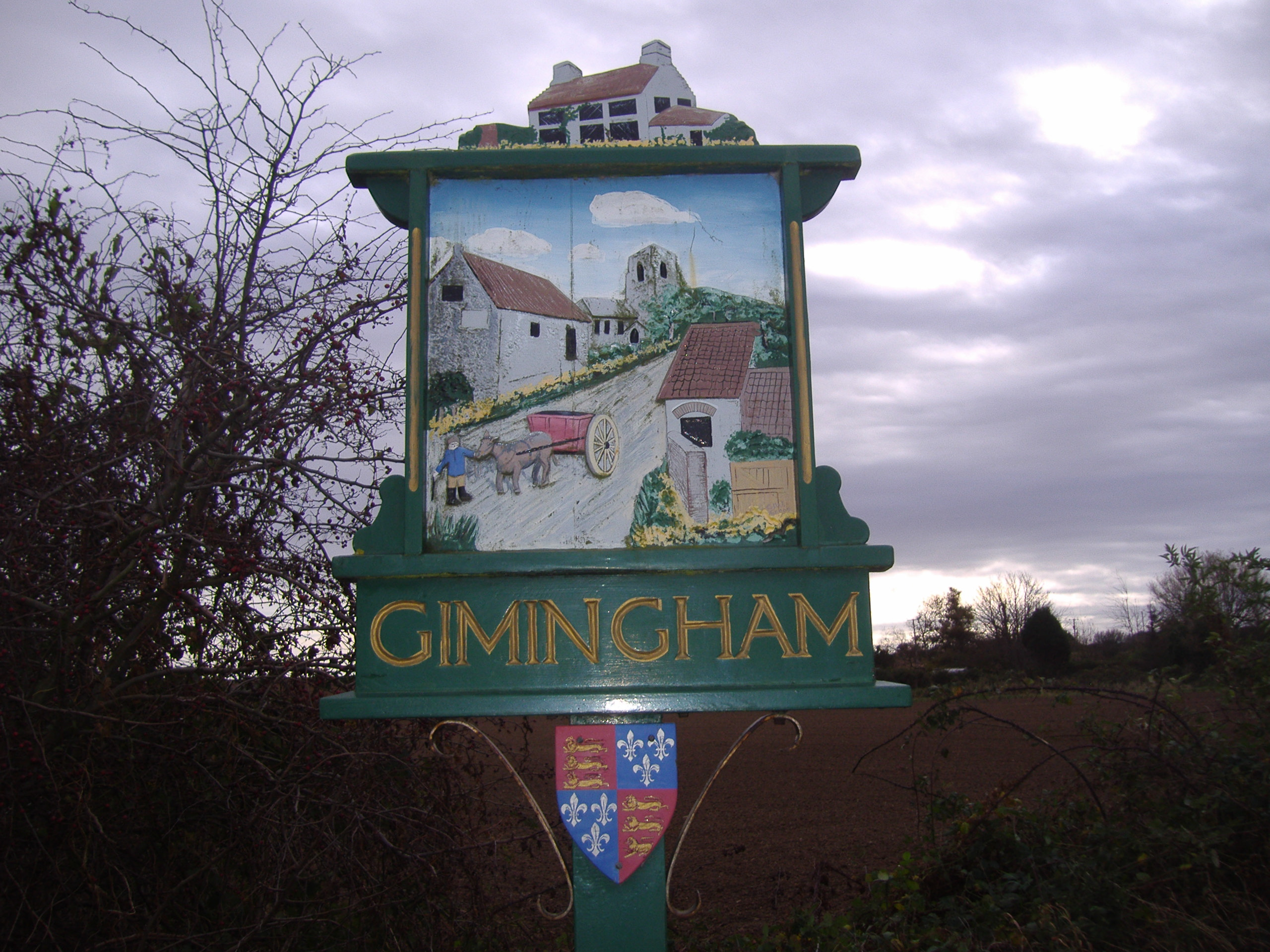
- The village sign.

- Location within Norfolk
- Area: 2.31 sq mi (6.0 km^{2})
- Population: 460 (2021 census)
  - Density: 199/sq mi (77/km^{2})
- OS grid reference: TG2937
- Civil parish: Gimingham
- District: North Norfolk
- Shire county: Norfolk
- Region: East
- Country: England
- Sovereign state: United Kingdom
- Post town: NORWICH
- Postcode district: NR11
- Dialling code: 01263
- Police: Norfolk
- Fire: Norfolk
- Ambulance: East of England
- UK Parliament: North Norfolk

Gimingham is a village and civil parish in the English county of Norfolk.

Gimingham is located 4.1 miles (6.6 km) north of North Walsham and 21.6 miles (34.8 km) north of the city of Norwich.

== History ==
Gimingham's name is of Anglo-Saxon origin and derives from the Old English for the homestead of Gymi or Gymma's people.

In the Domesday Book, Gimingham is listed as a settlement of 76 households in the hundred of North Erpingham. In 1086, the village was part of the East Anglian estates of William de Warenne.

In the medieval period, a hall was built and owned by the Duchy of Lancaster and was at one point the residence of John of Gaunt. The hall burned down in 1700 and is now a set of private dwellings.

In 1805, a workhouse was built in Gimingham but was later closed in 1851.

In 1898, one of the largest tuberculosis sanatorium in Britain was built in Gimingham. The sanatorium later evolved into a hospital and was finally closed in 1992.

During the Second World War, numerous pillboxes and mortar pits were built in Gimingham to defend against a possible German invasion.

Gimingham was the home of the former Diana Princess of Wales Treatment Centre, an independent addiction treatment centre that closed in 2009.

== Geography ==
According to the 2021 census, Gimingham has a population of 460 people which shows a decrease from the 513 people recorded in the 2011 census.

== All Saints' Church ==
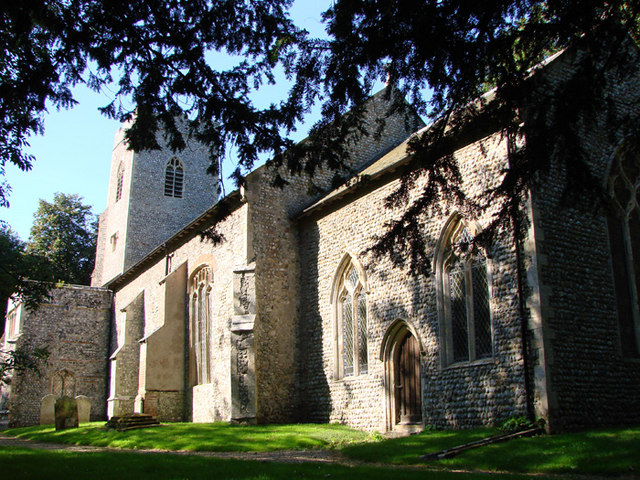
The Church

Gimingham Parish Church is dedicated to All Saints. The church has been part of the Trunch group of parishes since 1965 and is in the service of a team of clergy of these parishes. There was an earlier church on the site of the present one. Signs of early Anglo-Saxon quoins can be seen in the east wall of the chancel. The chancel dates from the early 14th century. The church is almost entirely built from un-knapped flint although there are some squared flints in the entrance porch. Some buttresses and arches are of brick construction. The porch has two storeys and was incorporated into a much older original porch. The room on the first floor is known as a parvise. This room was used in the past by priests who had travelled some distance to get to the church. It also may have been used in the past as part of the wedding service, with guests waiting there while the groom and bride exchanged their vows in the porch. The nave dates from the 15th century and was re-roofed around 1950. The battlemented tower is also 15th century. The belfry holds a ring of five bells. The original three bells were rehung and retuned in 1990. In 1992 the three bells were augmented to five by the addition of two lighter bells, cast in 1889 by Mears & Stainbank, which were relocated from Gosport. The tenor weighs 8cwt 1qtr 25lbs and is tuned to 'Ab. The work was undertaken by the Whitechapel Bell Foundry Ltd. The bells are rung regularly by visiting ringers. Set ringing dates include; Advent, Easter, Epiphany, All Saints' Day (1 November) and The King's Birthday (14 November).

== Mill Pond and Water Mill ==
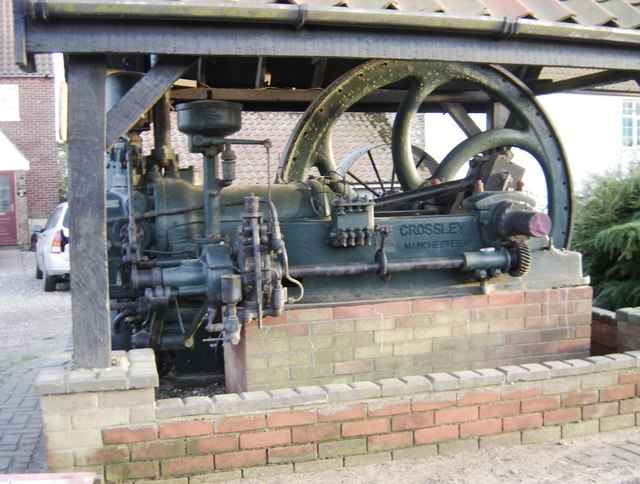
The preserved Crossley diesel engine

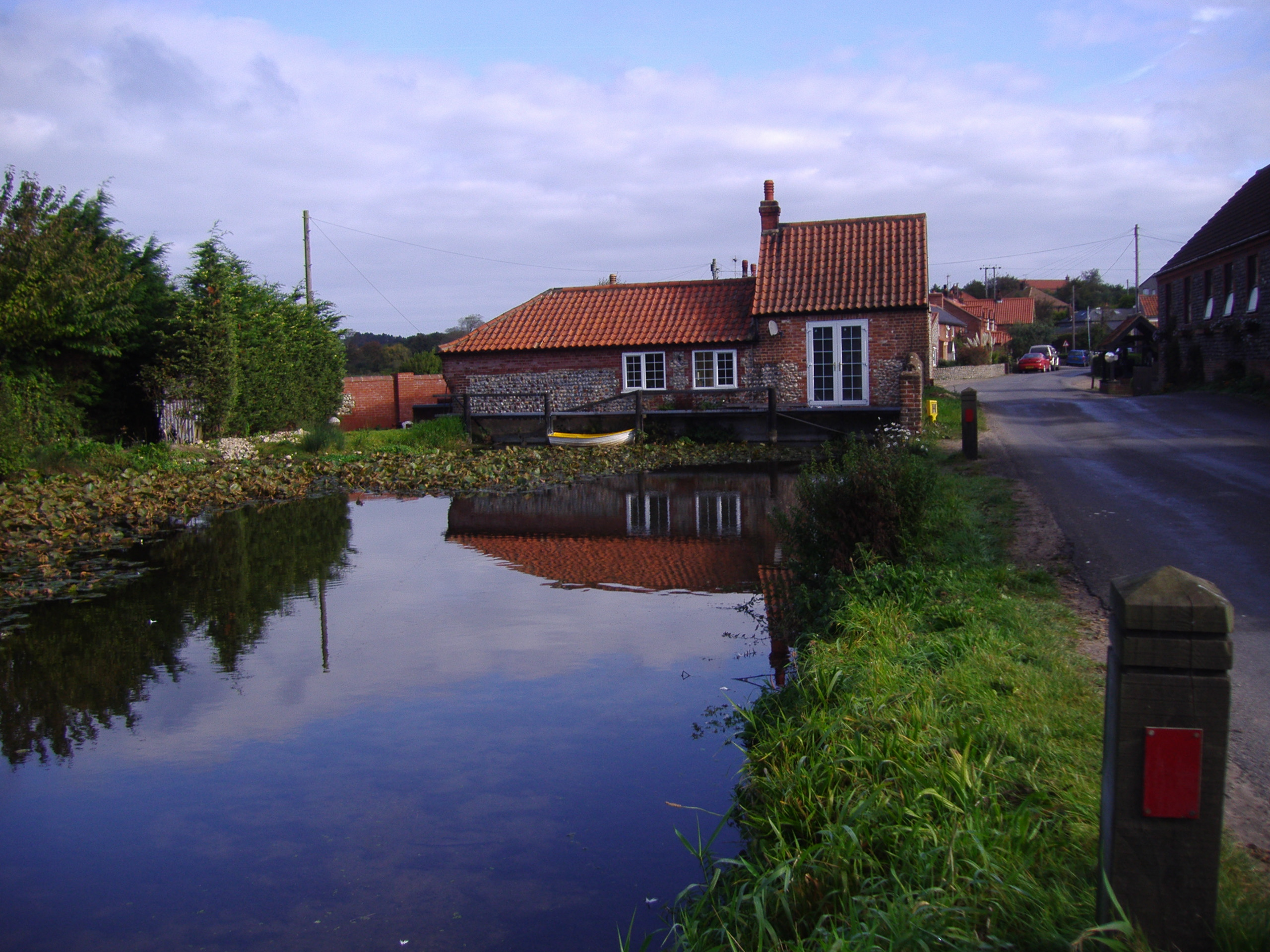
The River Mun pond

A feature of the village is the mill pond which stretches along the western edge of the main street. The pond is home to many species of water fowl and is very popular with local fisherman. The mill pond is filled by the River Mun. The area beyond the river is said to have been part of the stew pond, the fish-breeding place of a small monastery. Close to the mill pond is the rebuilt corn mill. The original watermill burnt down during the night of 15 February 1979. A mill mentioned in the Domesday Book stood on this location. The one previous to the present building was built in the 18th century of flint, brick and pantiles. The pit for the original water wheel still remains, as does the old diesel engine, which provided power to the mill for many years.

== Governance ==
Gimingham is part of the electoral ward of Mundesley for local elections and is part of the district of North Norfolk.

The village's national constituency is North Norfolk, which has been represented by the Liberal Democrat Steff Aquarone MP since 2024.

== War Memorial ==
Gimingham's war memorial is a set of two marble plaques inside All Saints' Church. The memorial lists the following names for the First World War:

Rank	Name	Unit	Date of death	Burial/Commemoration
Sgt.	Percy Clarke	1/5th Bn., Norfolk Regiment	19 Apr. 1917	Jerusalem Memorial
Dvr.	Bertie Dix	18th Vet.. Hospital, Army Service Cps.	20 Oct. 1916	Pietà Military Cemetery
Dvr.	Thomas F. Davies	240th Bde., Royal Field Artillery	12 Sep. 1917	Vlamertinge Cemetery
Pte.	William Bullimore	8th Bn., Bedfordshire Regiment	18 Sep. 1916	Guillemont Road Cemetery
Pte.	Sidney C. Harvey	1st Bn., Norfolk Regiment	4 Sep. 1916	Thiepval Memorial
Pte.	Francis S. Fuller	1st Bn., Norfolk Regt.	23 Apr. 1917	La Chaudière Cemetery
Pte.	William G. Pentney	1st Bn., Queen's Royal Regiment	23 Sep. 1918	Thilloy Road Cemetery
Pte.	Harry Bullimore	13th Bn., York and Lancaster Regt.	12 Apr. 1918	Ebblinghem Cemetery
Pte.	James W. Kirk	4th Bn., Yorkshire Regiment	21 Apr. 1917	Hibers Trench Cemetery

The following names were added after the Second World War:

Rank	Name	Unit	Date of death	Burial/Commemoration
Maj.	George G. Skelton MC	3rd County of London Yeomanry	28 Feb. 1945	Groesbeek War Cemetery
St.1C	Walter G. Seago	HMS Byrsa	18 Apr. 1945	Florence War Cemetery
Dvr.	Frederick G. Sexton	Royal Army Service Corps	20 Jun. 1941	St. Margaret's Churchyard
Dvr.	Frederick J. Kirk	221 Coy., Royal Engineers	5 Sep. 1944	Coriano Ridge Cemetery
Pte.	Collin R. D. Clarke	1st Bn., Hampshire Regiment	21 Jul. 1944	Tilly-sur-Seulles Cemetery
St.2C	William H. Hurn	HMS Newcastle	22 May 1944	Robertson Cemetery
