= River Mun =

River in north Norfolk, England

Mun Mundesley Beck
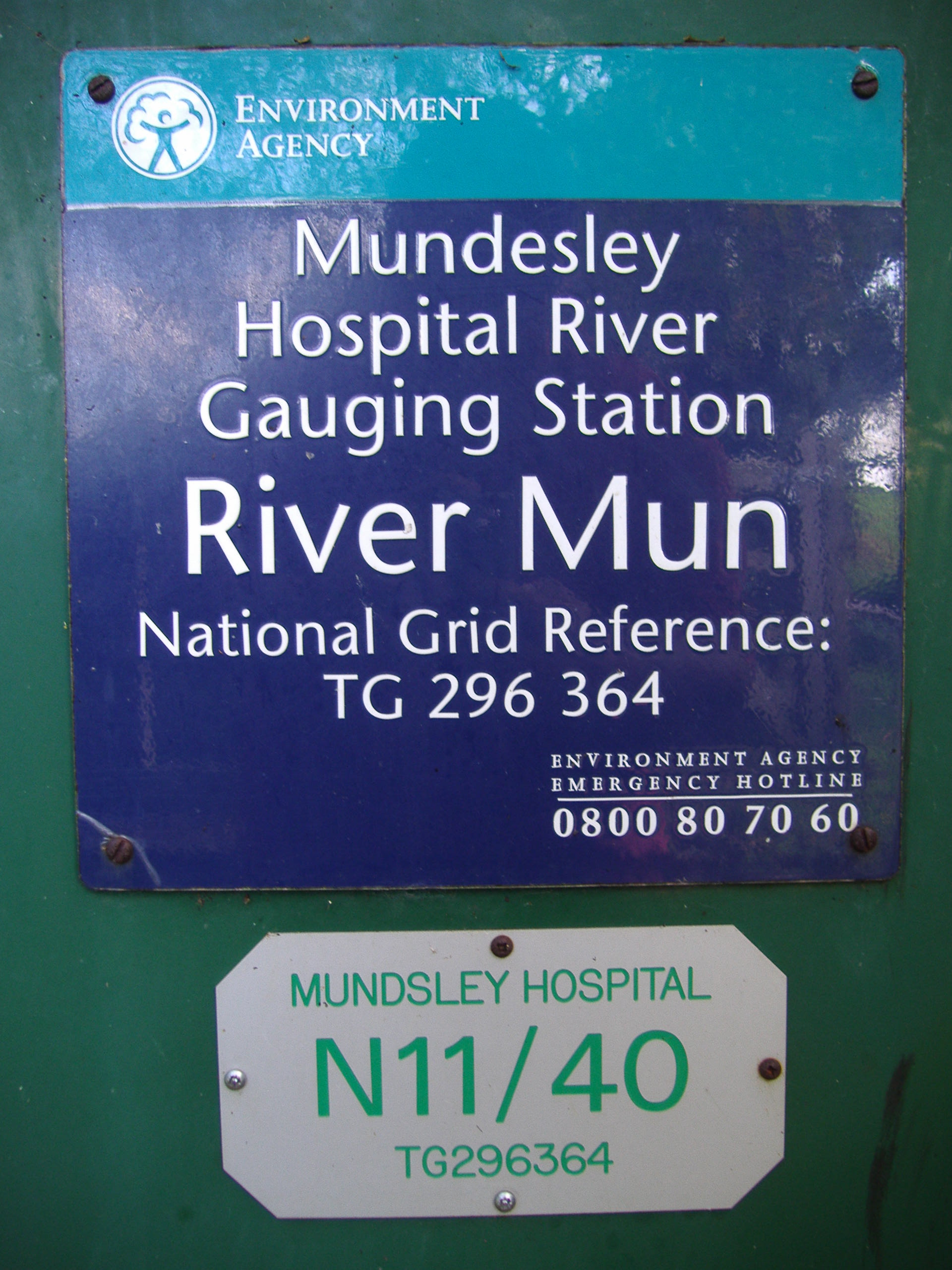
- River Mun Gauging Station

- Location of the river mouth within Norfolk

Location
- Country: England
- Region: Norfolk

Physical characteristics
- Source
  - location: Northrepps
  - coordinates: 52.9000°N 1.3404°E
  - elevation: 45 m (148 ft)
- Mouth: North Sea
  - location: Mundesley
  - coordinates: 52.8767°N 1.4410°E
  - elevation: 0 m (0 ft)
- Length: 8.9 km (5.5 mi)

The River Mun or Mundesley Beck is a river in the north of the county of Norfolk, England. Its source is in the parish of Northrepps. The river finally runs into the North Sea in the village of Mundesley.

== Course ==
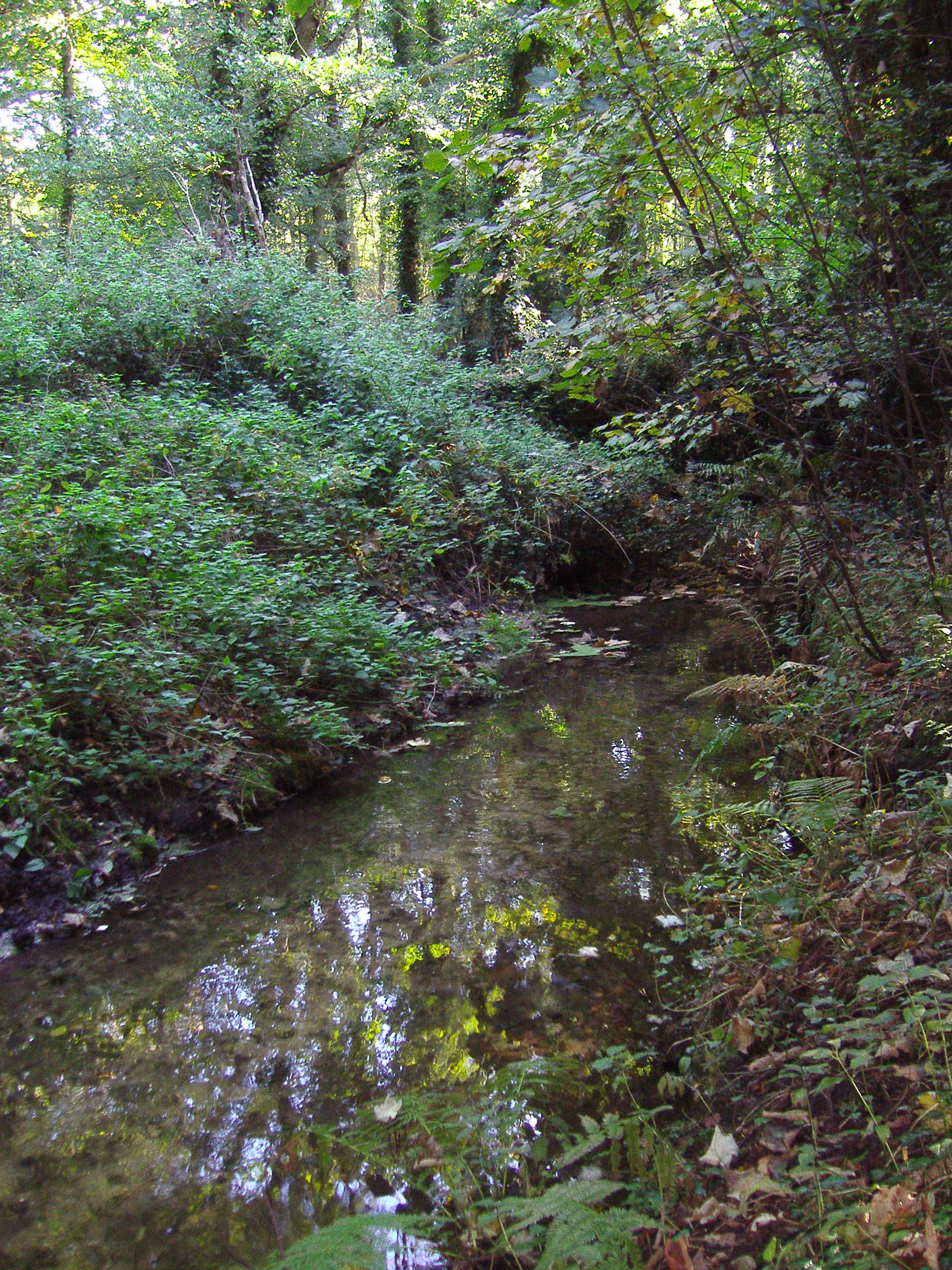
River Mun Passing through Osier Carr

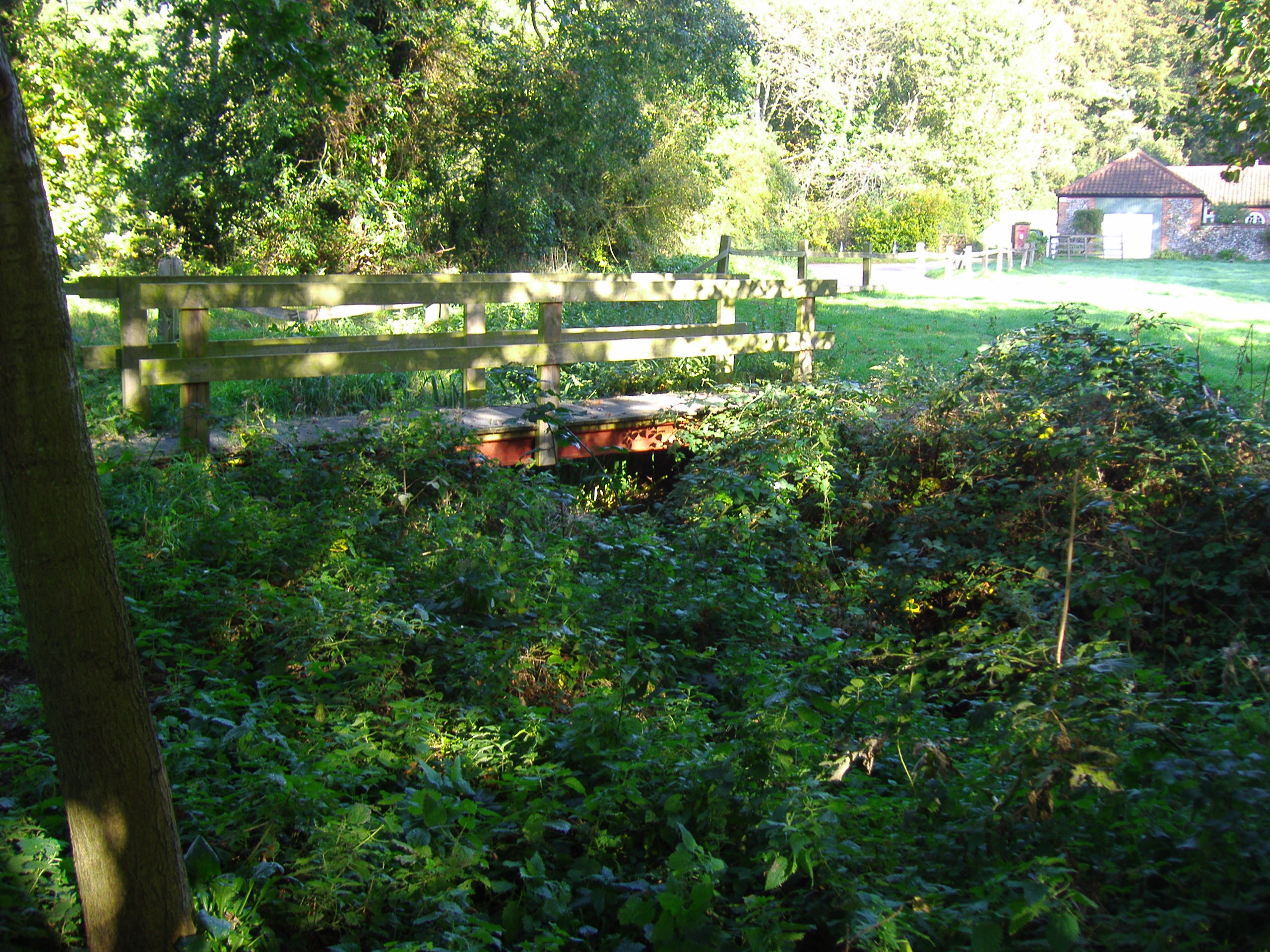
A footbridge over the River Mun at Frogshall

The river's source is next to Craft Lane, close to Furyhill plantation between Northrepps and the hamlet of Frogshall. It runs in a southeasterly direction through a wooded valley and passes under Craft Lane close to Frogshall Farm House. From here it runs through woodland for a short distance and into a large pool called Little Broad. From Little Broad, still in woodland, the river falls over a weir and into marshy woodland known as Osier Carr, where freshwater mussels can be found.

The river then passes under another lane from Sidestrand. From here the river feeds ponds and sluices in an area known as the Grove. Many drains feed into the river here. The river then turns almost south and passes under Cromer Road, then crosses countryside towards Ash Tree Farm and Ash Plantation. It widens slightly and begins to cross open countryside, slowly turning southeast again. Along this section, the Mun runs adjacent to several small reservoirs, ponds and drains.

== Gimingham watermill ==
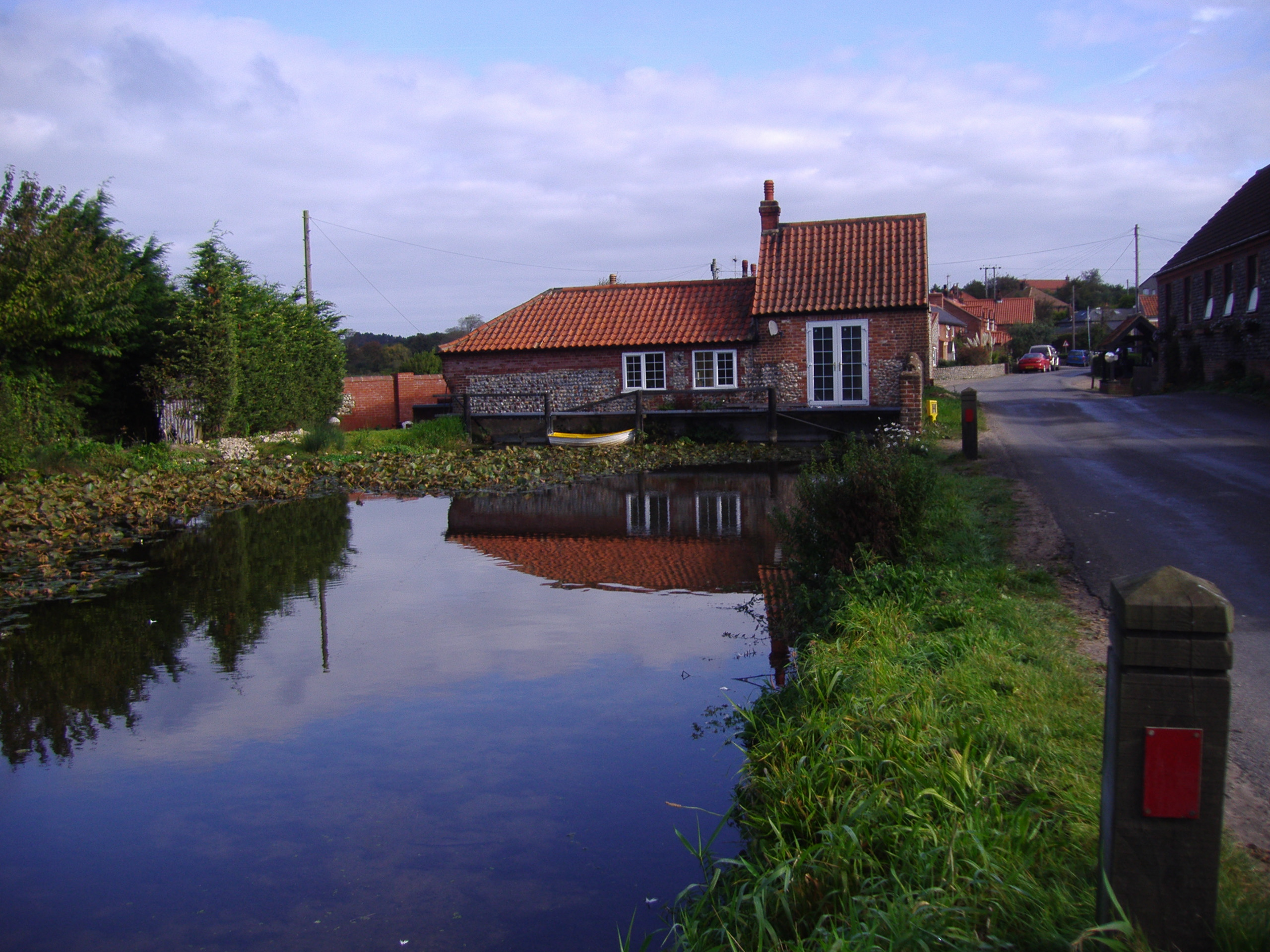
Gimingham mill pond

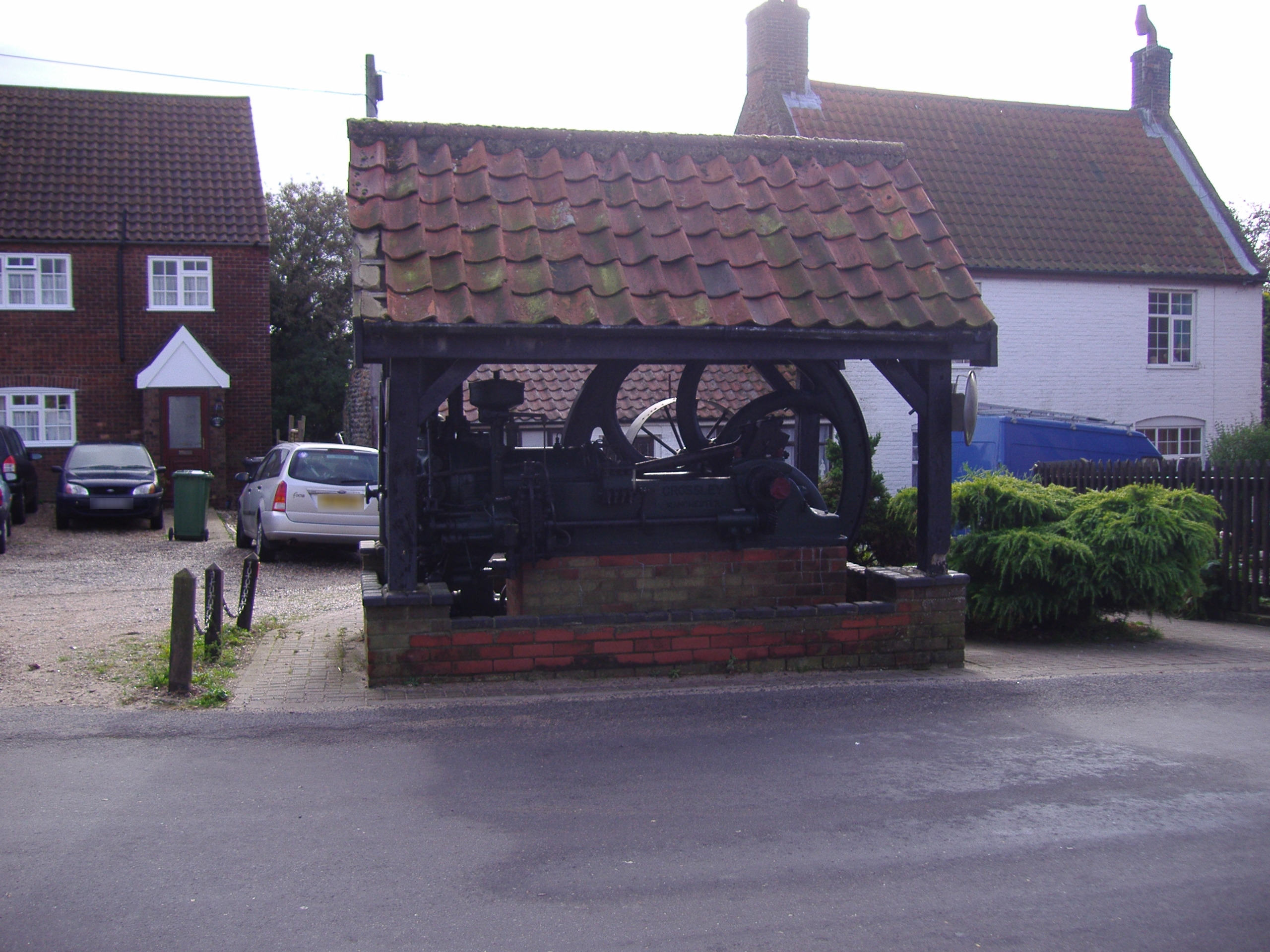
The Diesel mill Engine at Gimingham

At Gimingham the river flows into a series of mill ponds. The ponds once fed a watermill, whose dam held back a 20-acre (81,000 m^{2}) broad fed by the River.

There has been a mill at the location since the time of the Domesday Book. The watermill was worked in conjunction with the nearby Gimingham postmill until 1877. The original waterwheel was later supplemented by steam, then replaced by a turbine in 1912 and later by diesel engines, although water was still used for cooling them. It milled animal feedstuffs until 30 November 1976. The diesel engine has been preserved and stands on Mill Street.

Gimingham Mill Lake is a popular fishing location. Bream, carp, tench and roach can be caught.In the lake, pit and river, From Gimingham the river cross more open farm land now heading east, passing on its left Mundesley Hospital which was refurbished in 1997 and is now the Diana, Princess of Wales Treatment Centre for Drug and Alcohol Problems. Where the road leading up to the hospital crosses the River Mun, the Environment Agency has a Water Resource Management gauging station. From here the river begins to skirt the southern side of the coastal village of Mundesley.

== Mun valley and Mundesley golf course ==
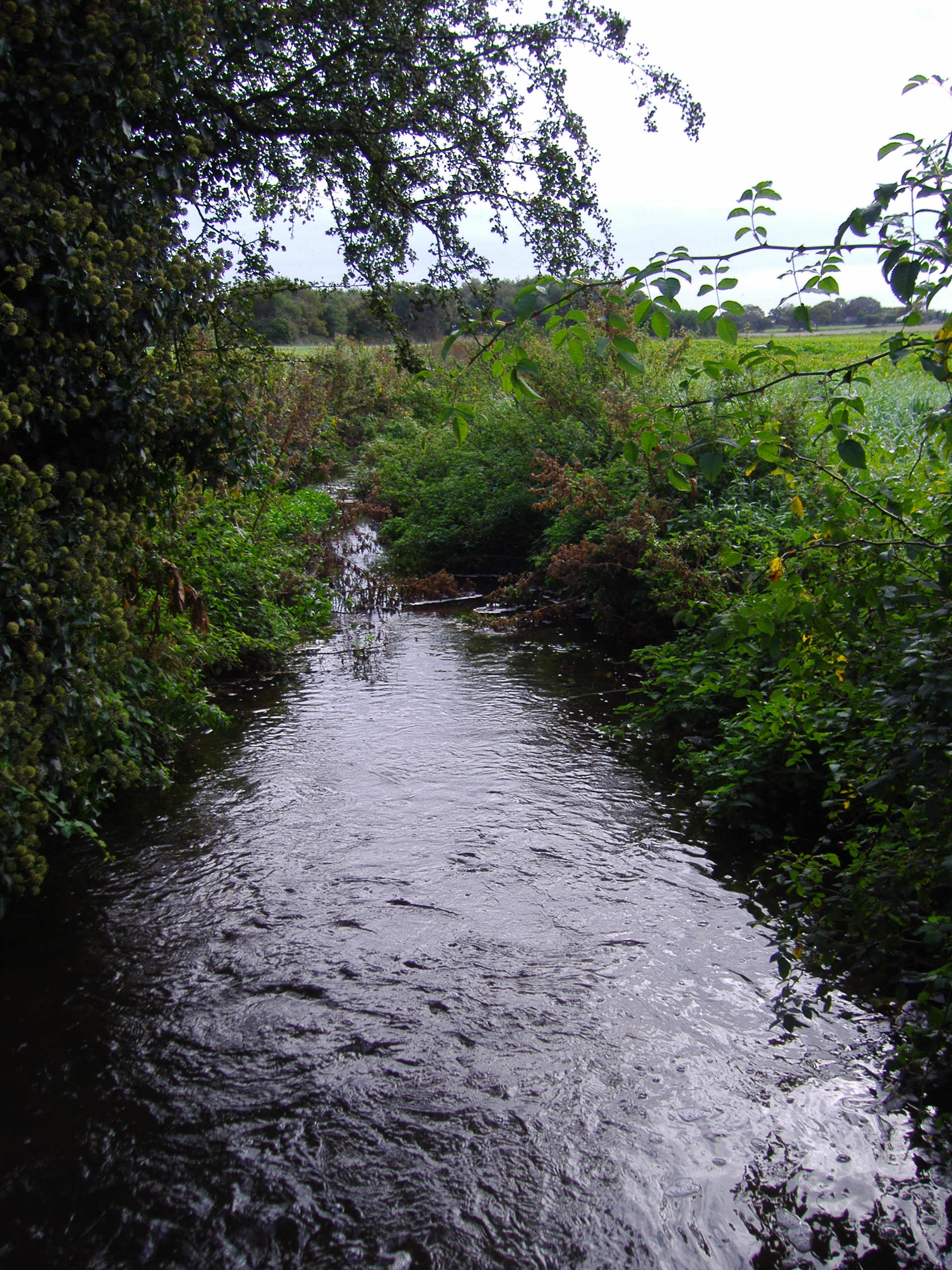
River Mun or Mundesley Beck

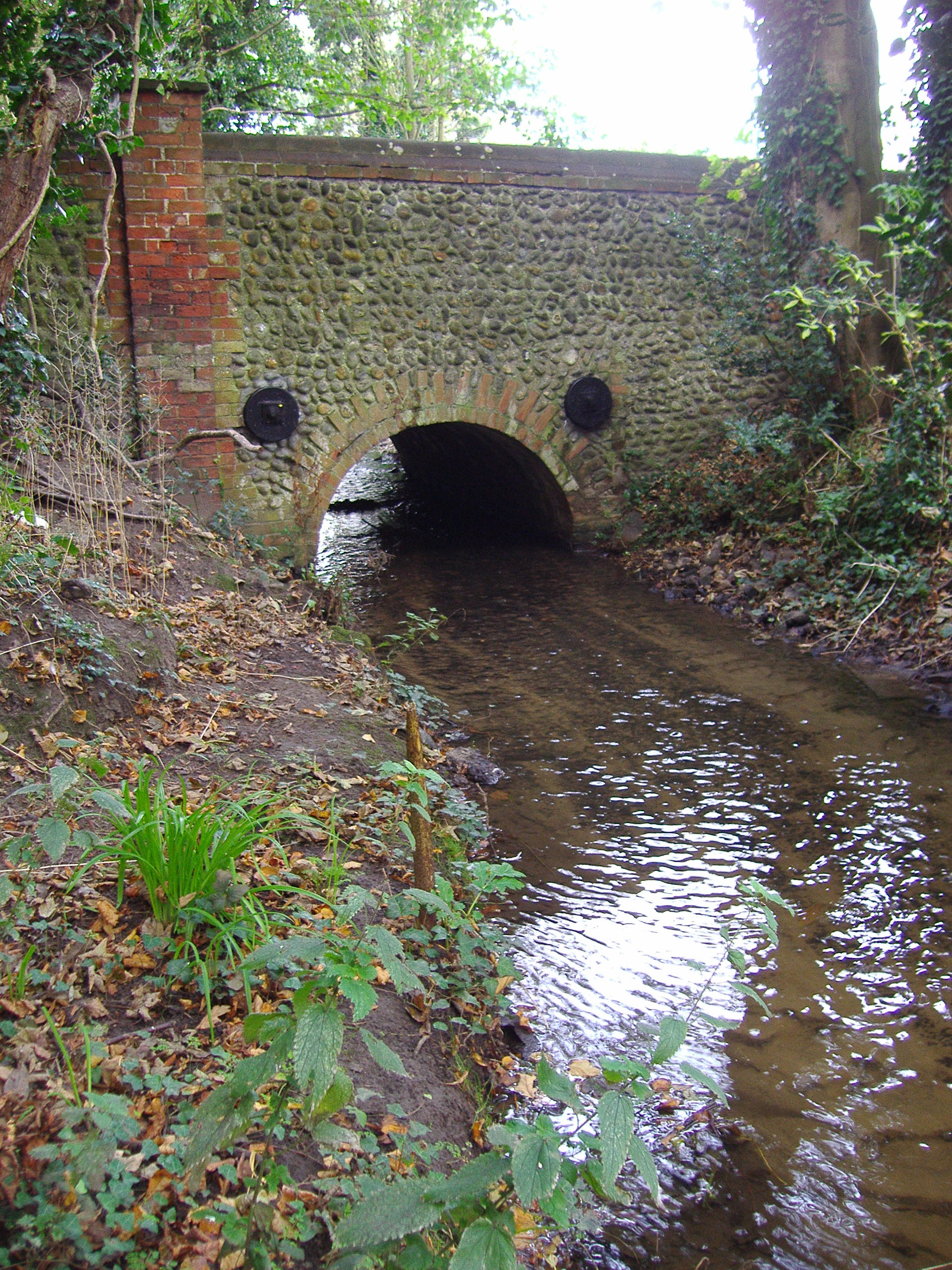
Road Bridge over the River in Mundesley Village

The valley here is part of Mundesley Golf Club. The golf club was established in 1901, and was designed with the help of one of the sport's legends, 6-times Open winner Harry Vardon (1870–1937), built on the rolling hillside of the River Mun valley. Today its nine holes, with 18 tees, offer a satisfying challenge to players of all abilities. Harry Vardon's association with Mundesley Golf Club spanned many years, from consultation, in 1900 to his misfortune to contract tuberculosis in 1903, and it was to Mundesley's sanatorium that he went for treatment. While recuperating in 1904, still at the sanatorium, he ventured along the lane which bisects the course to enjoy a round of golf. Here he experienced his only career hole-in-one, on what is now the sixth, a feat which no doubt contributed to the success of his convalescence.

From the golf course the river travels a short distance due east and enters the village under Trunch Road close to its junction with High Street and Heath Road. Just past Trunch Road the river falls over another weir before turning north into the eastern side of the village.

== Mundesley Watermill ==
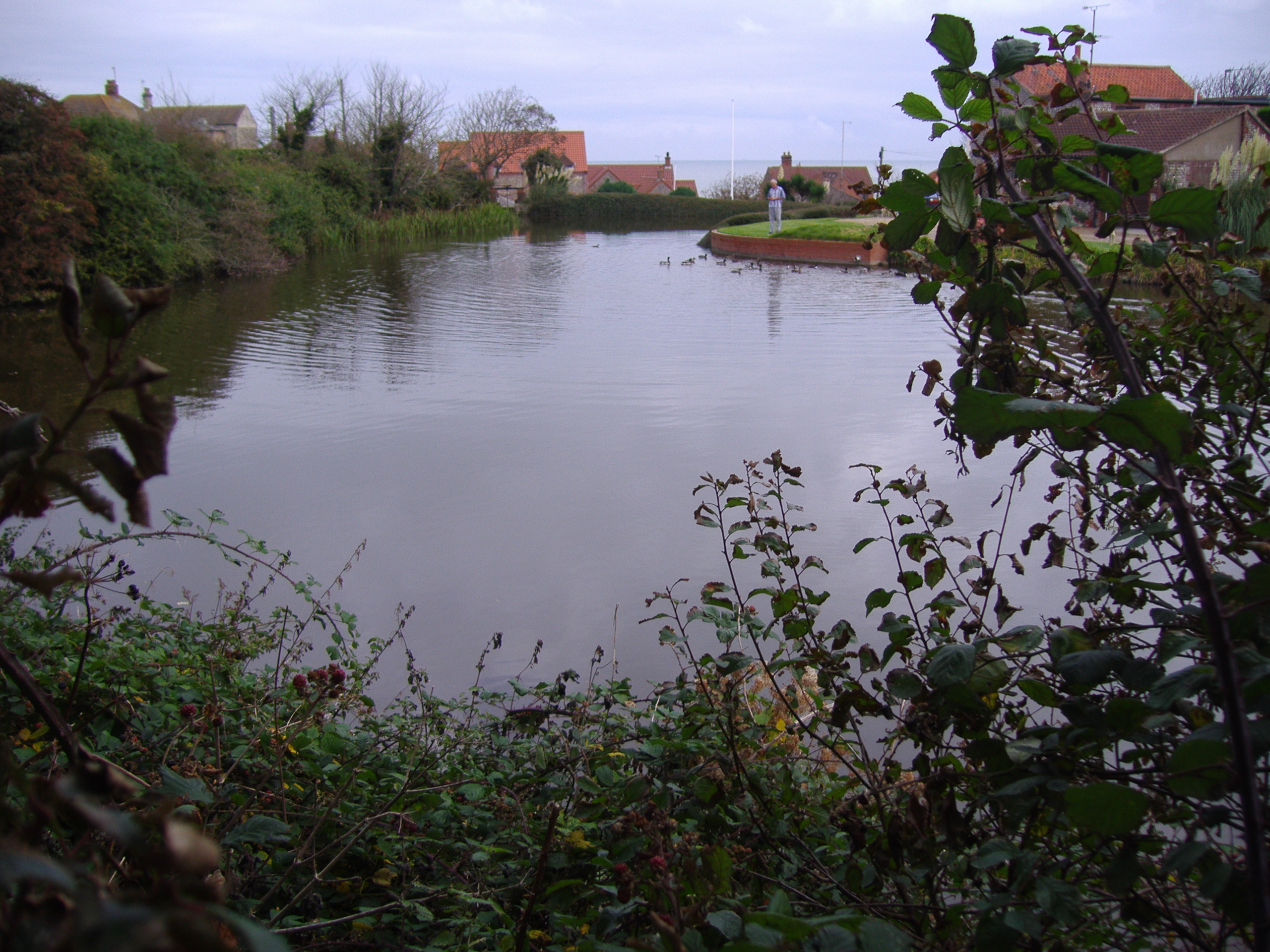
Mundesley mill pond

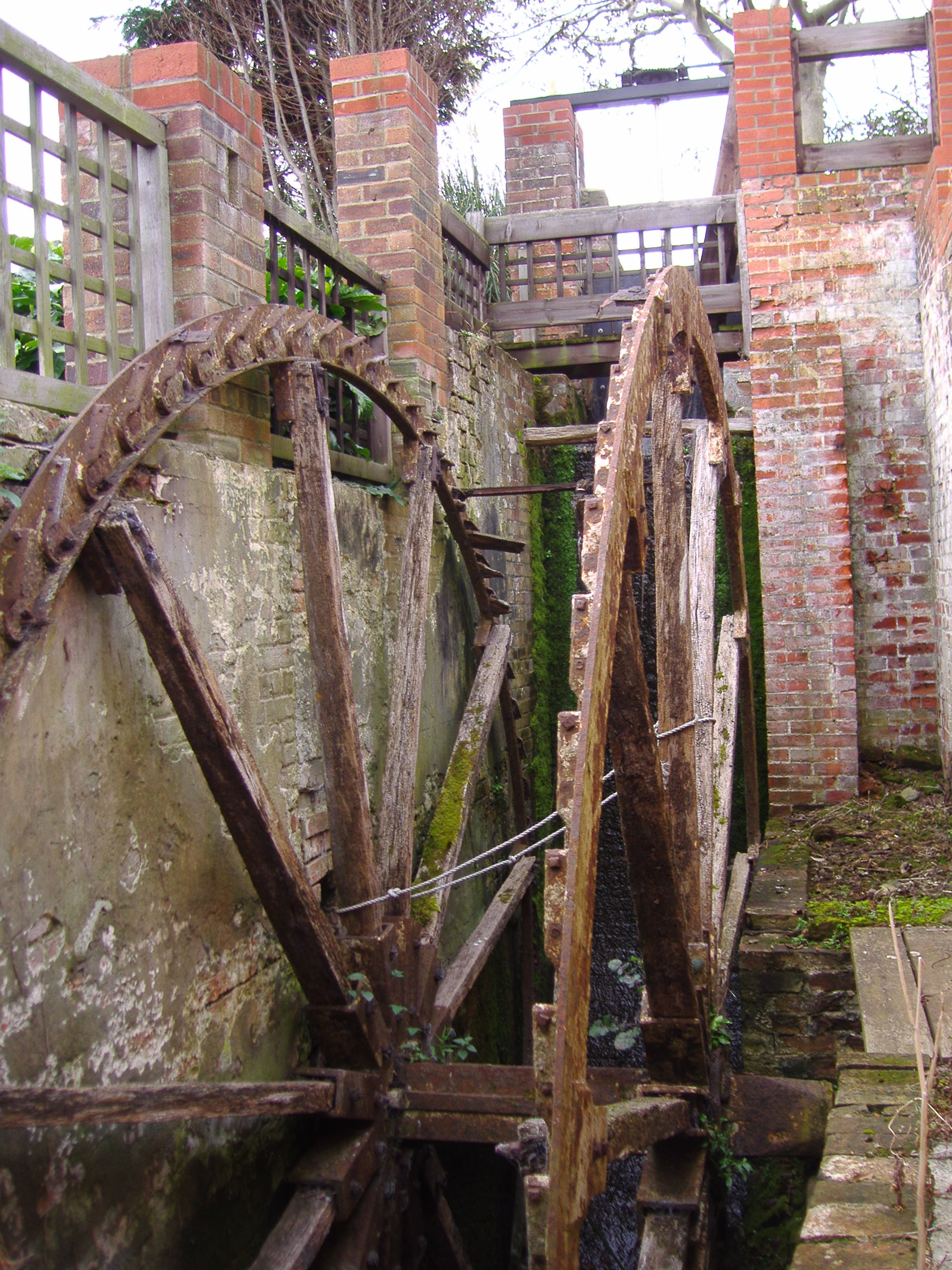
The Waterwheel at Mundesley

The river now fills another mill pond where once the second mill on the river worked. Mundesley watermill was built c.1723 and consisted of two brick floors supporting a weather boarded upper floor and roof space under a Norfolk pantiled roof. Seen from the roadside, Mundesley Mill has five floors but if you took the public pathway round to the back, only two would have been visible. This is because the mill pool lying behind was level with the third floor. The builders set the mill deep into a high bank, over which the water would have fallen freely in the old days before findings its way to the beach, although it is quite possible the water was diverted to this point for the purpose of driving the mill. Unusually the mill had an overshot waterwheel. The only way to provide a sufficient head of water was to dam the river to form the mill pond we see today which is some considerable height above the road. When the mill was working, 8 million gallons of water flowed through per day. When the mill was worked by the Larter family in the 1920s, the deeds stated that anyone interfering with the river had to pay dues to the millers. The Larter family also used the mill to generate electricity, which also supplied power to some of the surrounding properties including a Bell's grocery shop, Larter & Rudran's bicycle garage and a property at The Dell. The mill burnt down in November 1956. Some of the cog wheels were still visible in their mountings within the shell of the building in 1959. The remains of the building were finally pulled down in the summer of 1965. The waterwheel was large with a diameter of 26 feet (7.9 m) and the owner of the Mill House decided to enclose the wheel behind a grill and to leave it as a showpiece. The wooden spokes and the rim can still be seen, and some of the metal scoops and some wooden cogs have been replaced. For many years it still turned whenever enough water was available. The river's water flowed over the wheel and then under the road and into the North sea through a pipe.

== Gallery ==
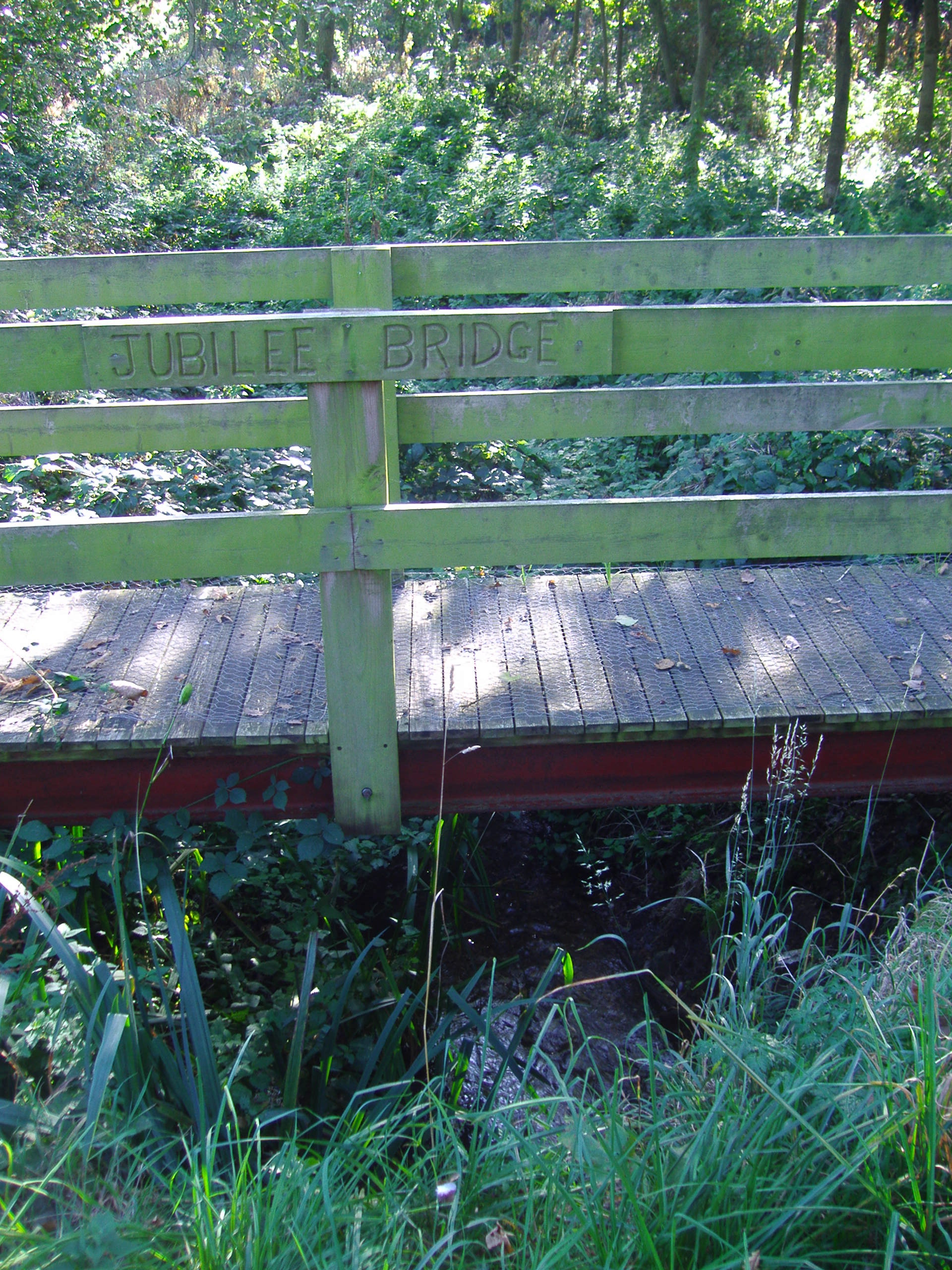
Jubilee footbridge at Frogshall.

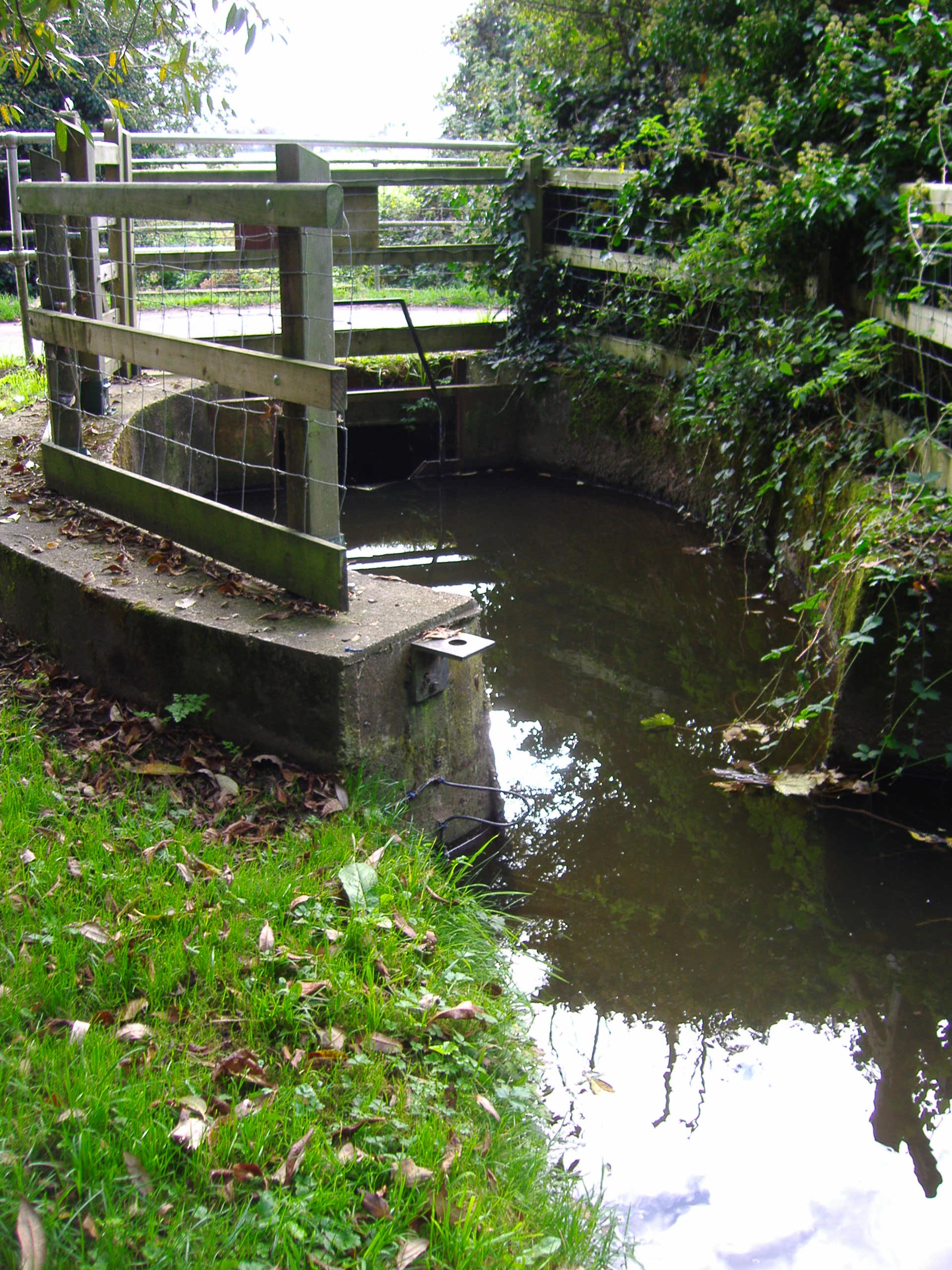
Gauging station on the River Mun at Mundesley Hospital.

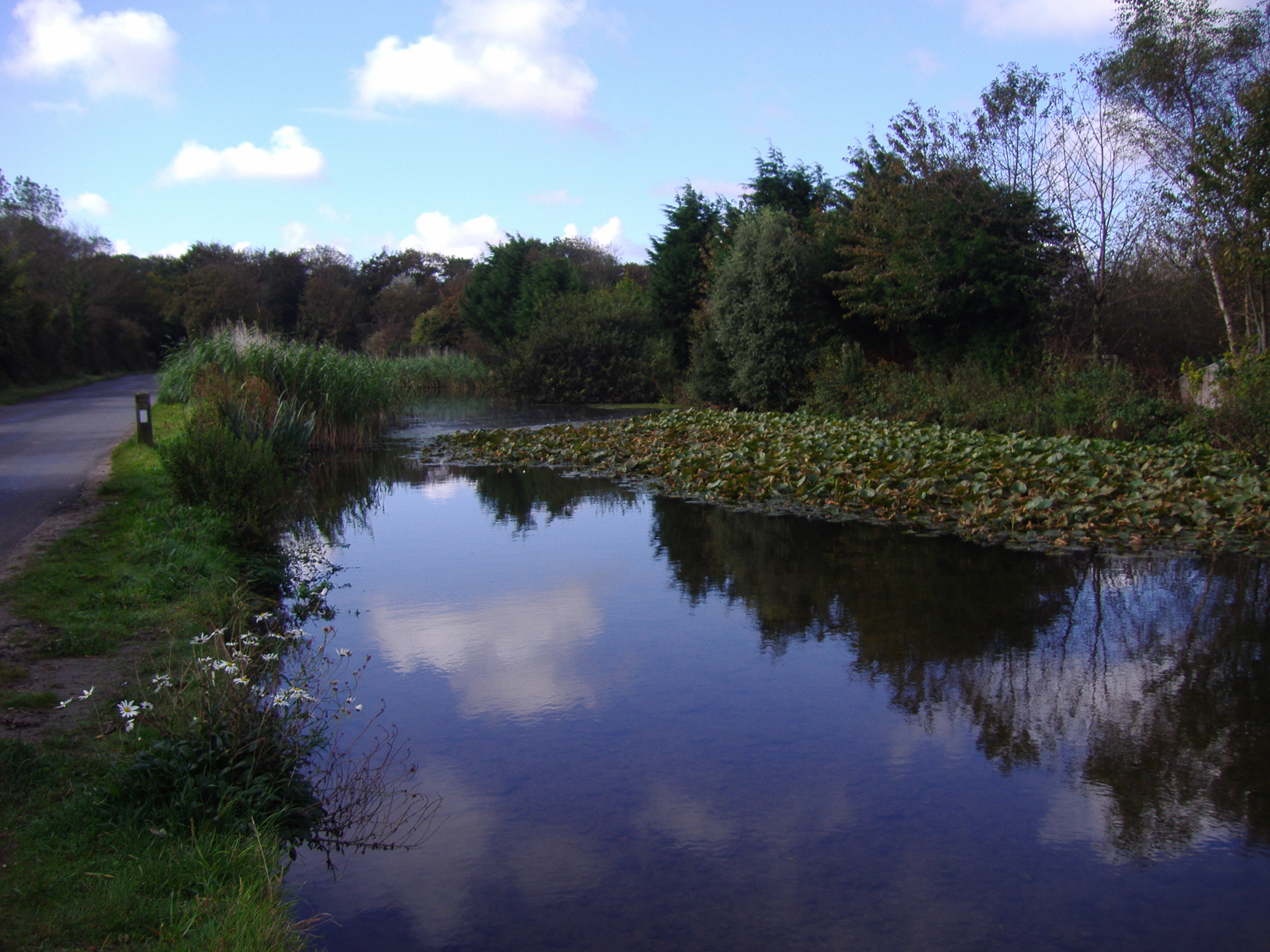
Gimingham mill pond.

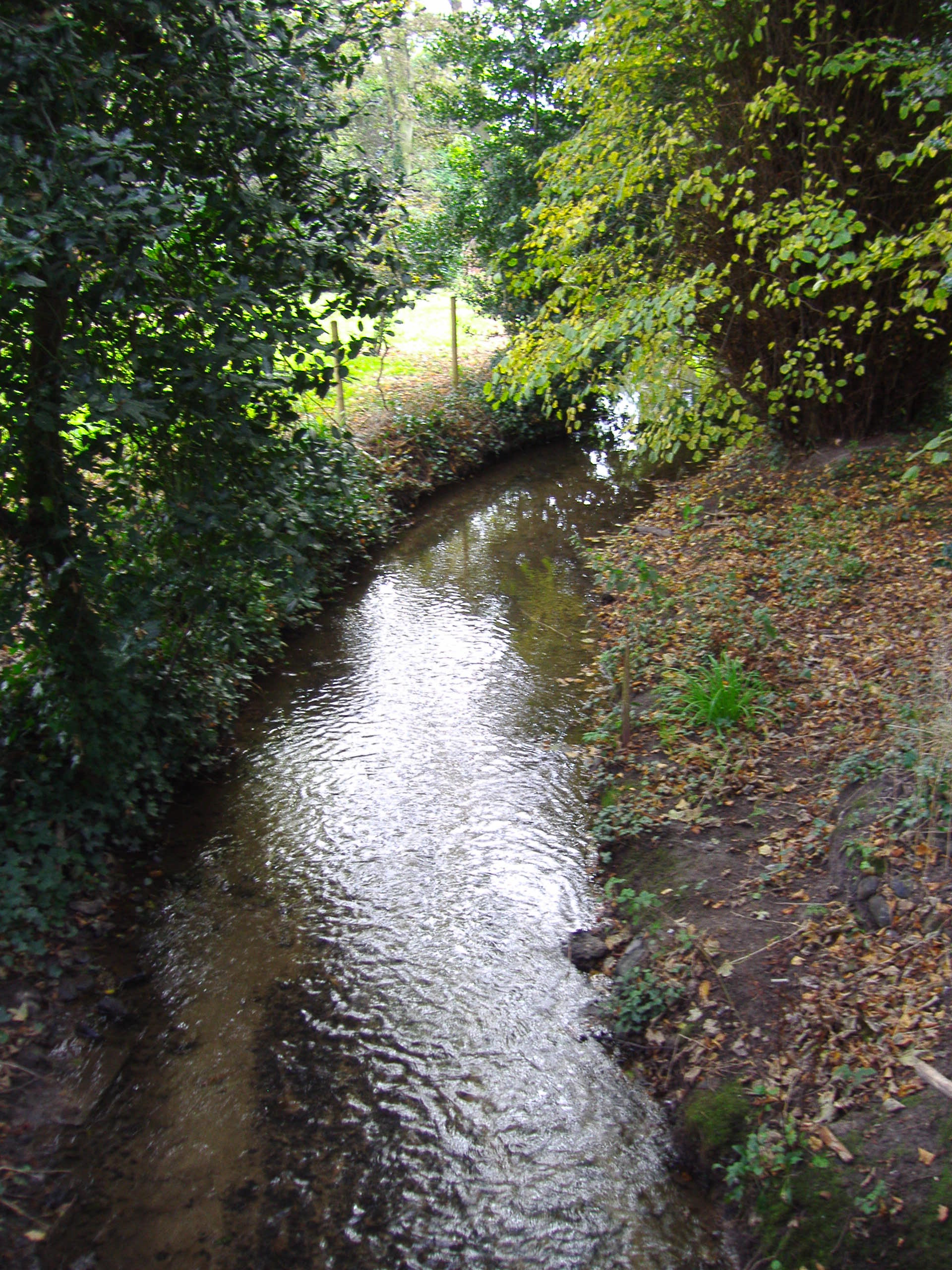
The River Mun at Mundesley

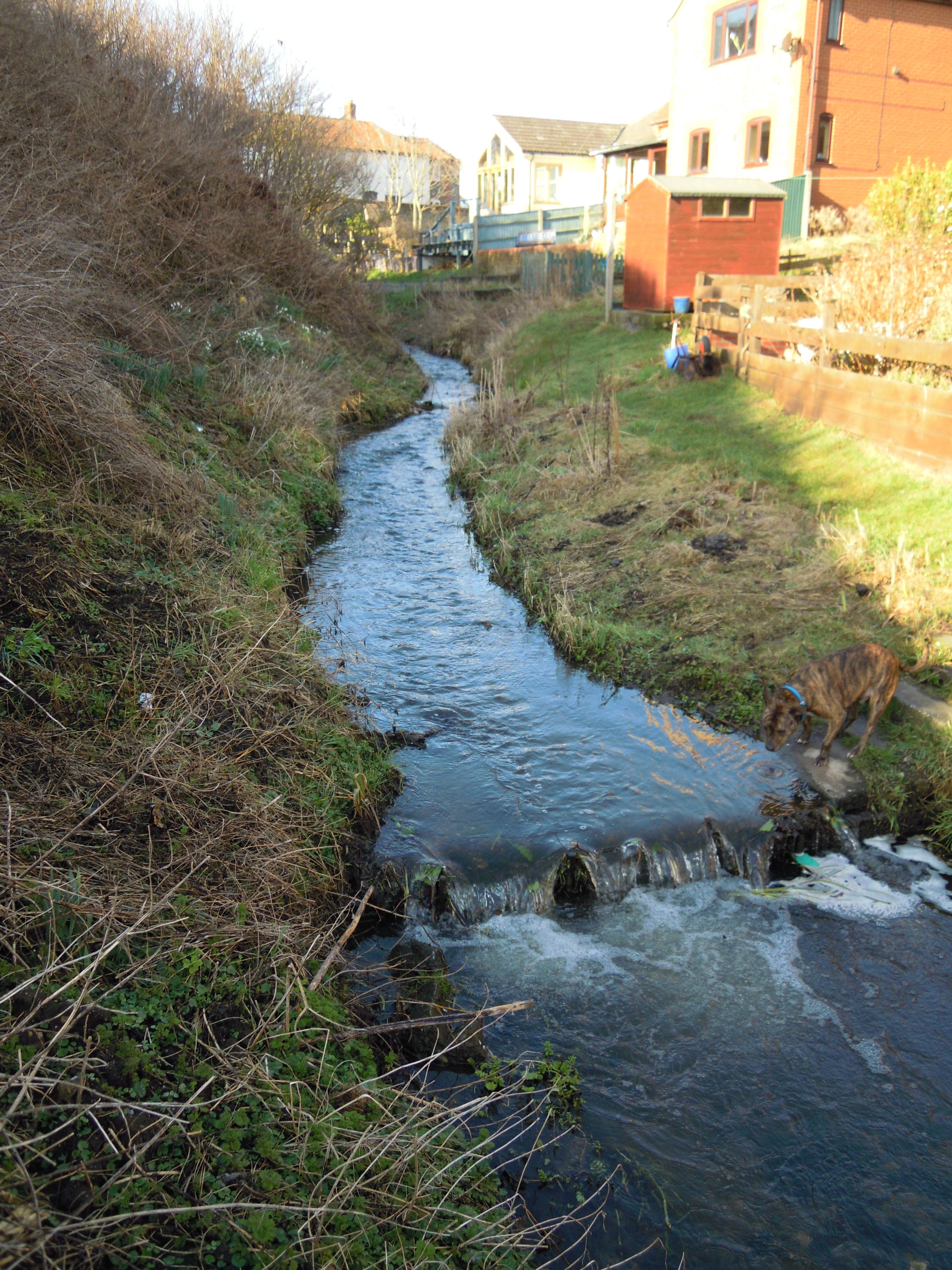
The River at its outfall into the North Sea, looking back upstream

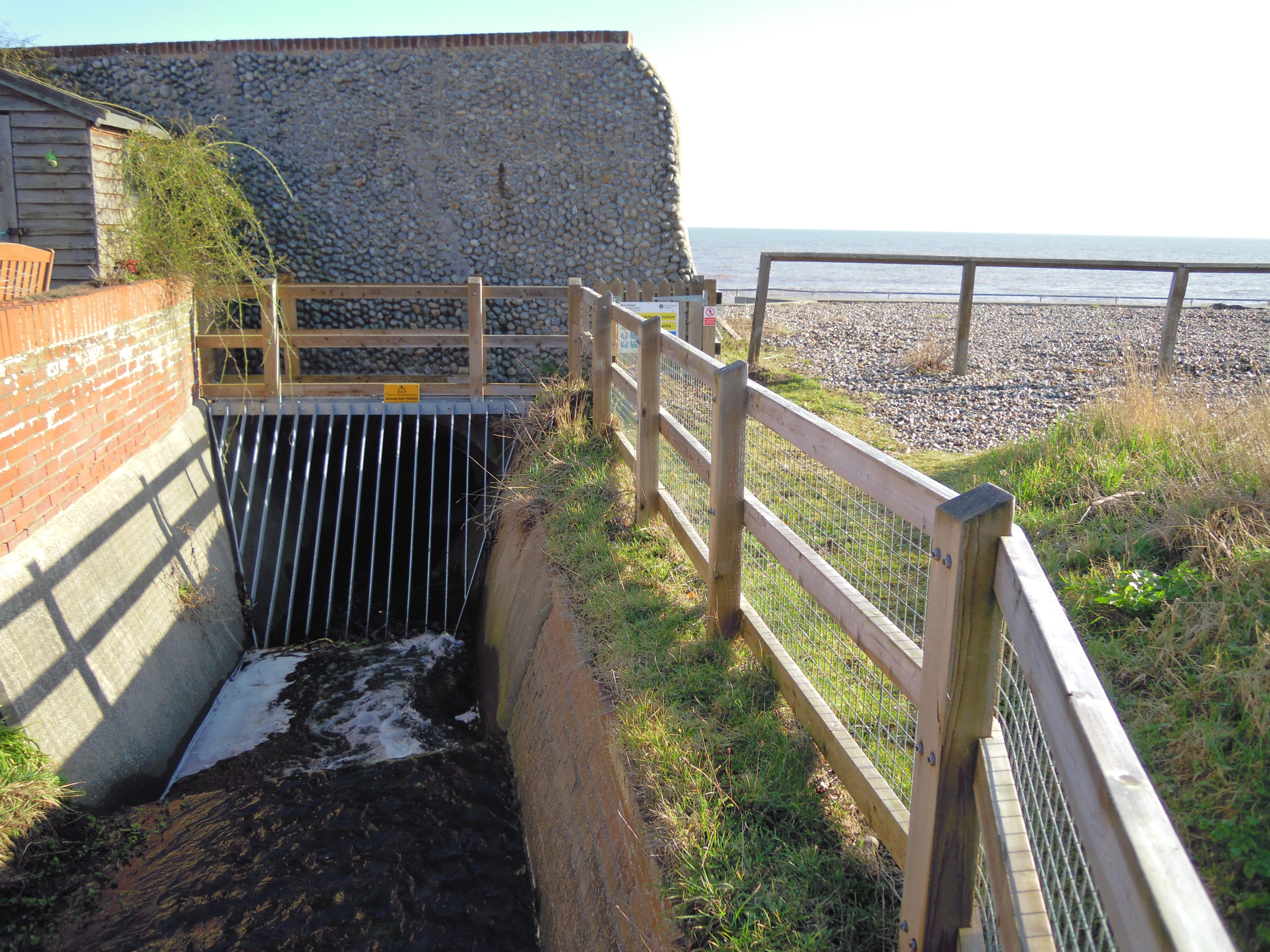
The River at its outfall into the North Sea
