= Northrepps Aerodrome =

Private airfield in Norfolk, England

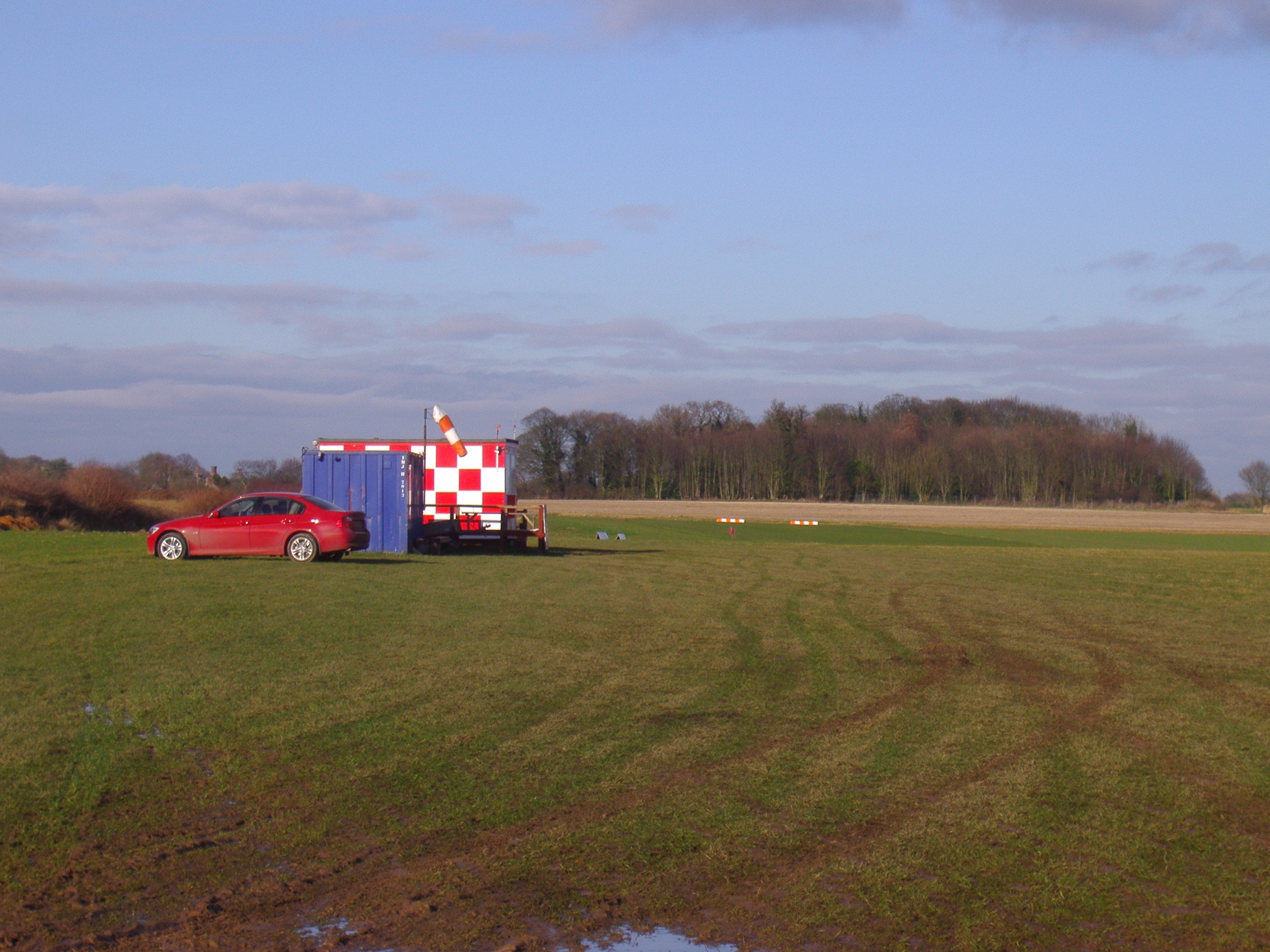
- Northrepps Aerodrome January 2008
- IATA: none; ICAO: none

Summary
- Airport type: Private
- Operator: C.Gurney Esq.
- Location: Cromer, Norfolk, England
- Elevation AMSL: 190 ft / 58 m
- Coordinates: 52°53′34″N 001°19′10″E
- Website: www.northreppsaerodrome.co.uk

Map
- Location in Norfolk

Runways
Direction	Length		Surface
Direction	m	ft	Surface
15/33	385	1,263	Grass
04/22	665	2,181	Grass

Northrepps Aerodrome is a privately owned airfield south west of the village of Northrepps, North Norfolk, England approximately 3 miles (5 km) south-south-east of Cromer. It is located next to the A149 road close to its junction with the A 140.

== History ==
Northrepps Aerodrome opened in October 2007 following the closure of Northrepps International Airport, which was located just 1 km (0.62 mi) north-east of the current aerodrome. Northrepps International Airport had just one runway (18/36) with a pronounced downslope on the southerly runway, which meant that aircraft generally took off on runway 18 and landed on runway 36 regardless of wind direction. That unusual arrangement had been the cause of some accidents, with aircraft occasionally overshooting the runway.

== Airfield operations ==
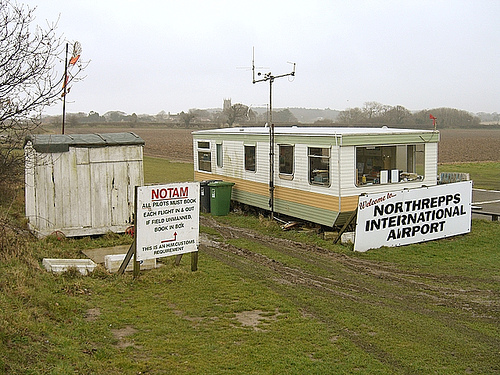
Terminal building at the old Northrepps International Airport

The aerodrome is an unlicensed airfield, but microlights, light aircraft and helicopters are permitted to land with prior permission, and at the pilot's own risk. Northrepps has two runways available: 04/22 and 15/33.

There are several helicopter main routes running close to Northrepps, (1,500 ft (460 m) – FL60) runs north-west to south-east to the north of the airfield and HMR 7 (Helicopter Main Route) crossing the northern boundary of the airfield. There is also military and civil low-level flying in the vicinity seven days a week.

Circuits are at 700 ft (210 m) above aerodrome level.

== Other activities ==
There is microlight and paramotoring activity at the airfield seven days a week, and crop spraying is carried out occasionally from Northrepps. There are banner-towing flights at some times of the year, and on some weekdays radio-controlled aircraft are flown.
