= Frogshall =

Hamlet in Norfolk, England

Coordinates: 52.89441°N 1.34909°E

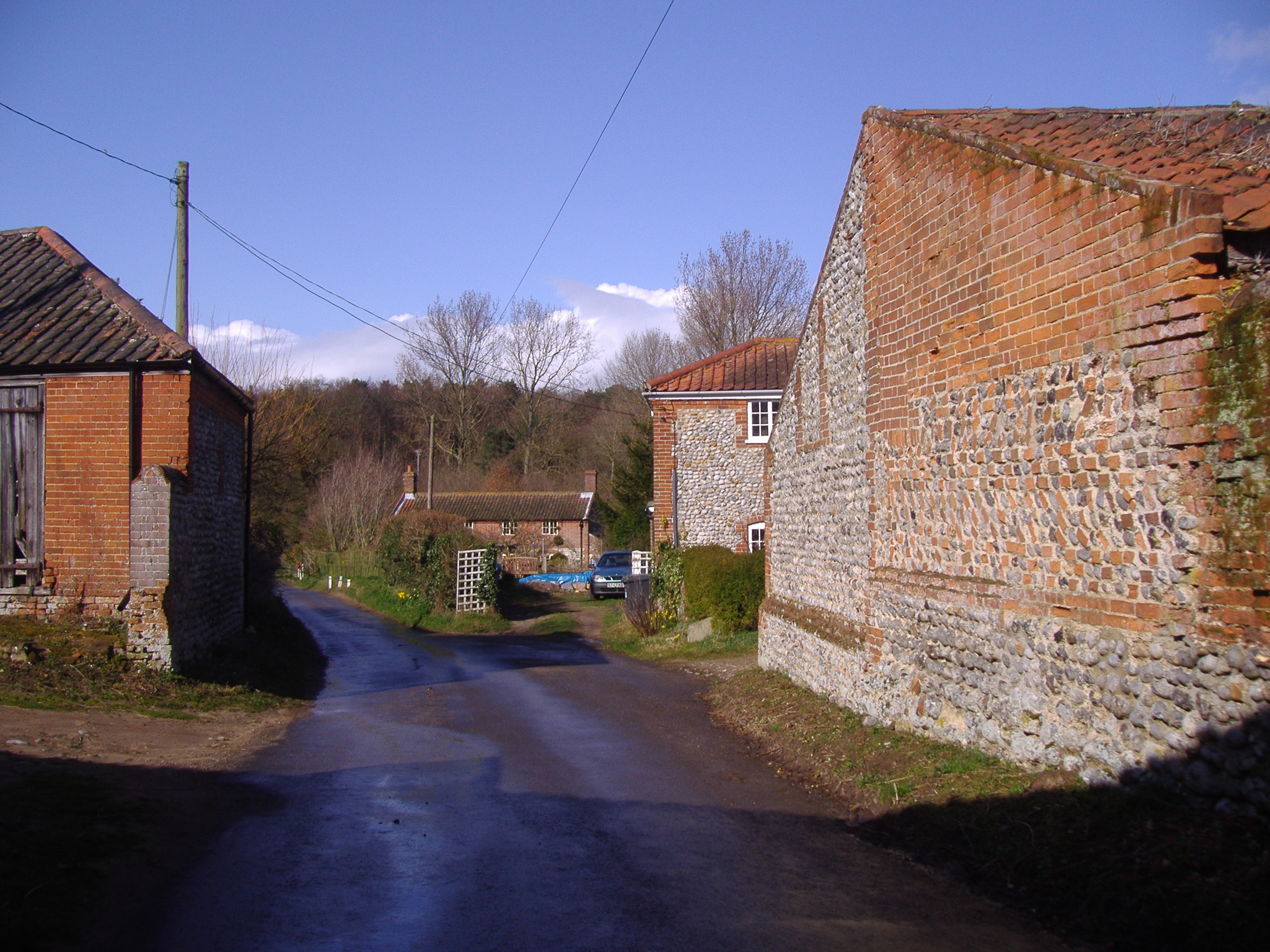
- The hamlet of Frogshall

- Location within Norfolk
- OS grid reference: TG2538
  - London: 136 miles
- Civil parish: Northrepps
- District: North Norfolk
- Shire county: Norfolk
- Region: East
- Country: England
- Sovereign state: United Kingdom
- Post town: CROMER
- Postcode district: NR27
- Dialling code: 01263
- Police: Norfolk
- Fire: Norfolk
- Ambulance: East of England
- UK Parliament: North Norfolk

Frogshall is a small hamlet within the civil parish of Northrepps in the English county of Norfolk. The hamlet is 5.2 miles (8.4 km) southeast of Cromer, 21.9 miles (35.2 km) north of Norwich and 136 miles (219 km) north of London. Craft Lane runs through the hamlet between Northrepps and Southrepps. The nearest railway station is at Gunton on the Bittern Line which runs between Sheringham, Cromer and Norwich. The nearest airport is Norwich International Airport. The hamlet as part of the greater parish of Northrepps had in the 2011 census, a population of 886. For the purposes of local government, the hamlet falls within the district of North Norfolk.

== Description ==
The hamlet is a small scattered settlement in the wooded valley of the River Mun in the south-east of the parish of Northrepps. Within the hamlet is the house called Templewood. Most of the houses were originally workers' cottages for the estate workers. Craft Lane gives road access to the hamlet from Southrepps and Northrepps. The lane is also a designated Quiet Lane.

== Templewood ==
Templewood house was built 1938 as shooting box and base for other country activities for Samuel Hoare, Lord Templewood by Paul Edward Paget of the architectural firm Seely & Paget. Hoare was Paget's uncle. The house incorporates fragments from the old Bank of England by John Soane, and from Nuthall Temple which stood in Nottinghamshire and was one of only four houses built in the United Kingdom generally said to have been inspired by Palladio's Villa Capra in Vicenza. The two sphinxes which flank the terrace in front of the portico were salvaged from Nuthall Temple in Nottinghamshire, which was demolished in 1929. The four columns which support the portico were salvaged from Soane's Old Bank of England in London. Paget retired in 1970 to Templewood together with his wife and her children. He had inherited Templewood from his uncle when the latter died in 1959.

The listed building is in excellent condition, and is set in parkland and approached down a long chestnut tree-lined avenue.

== Gallery ==
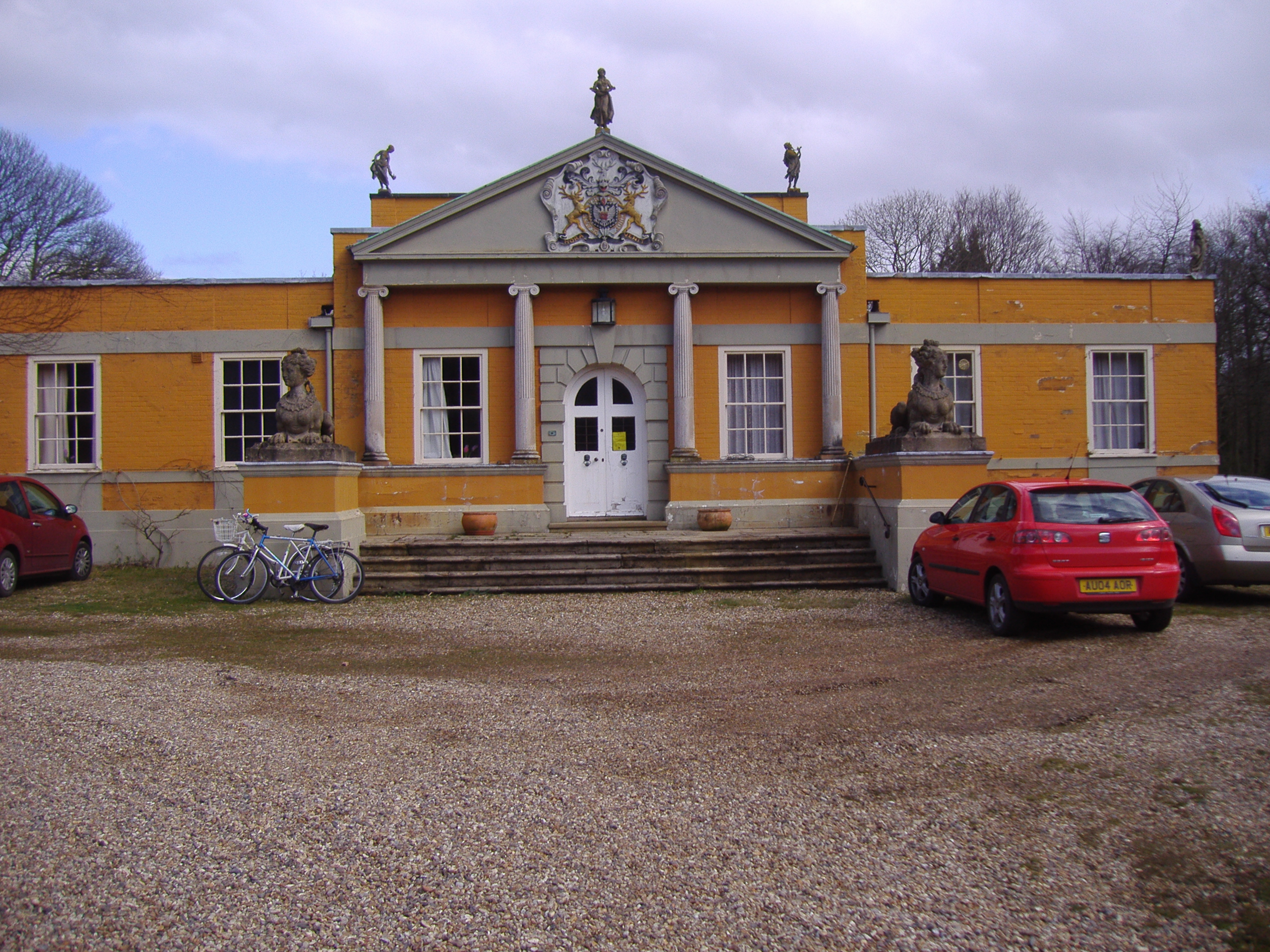
Templewood House

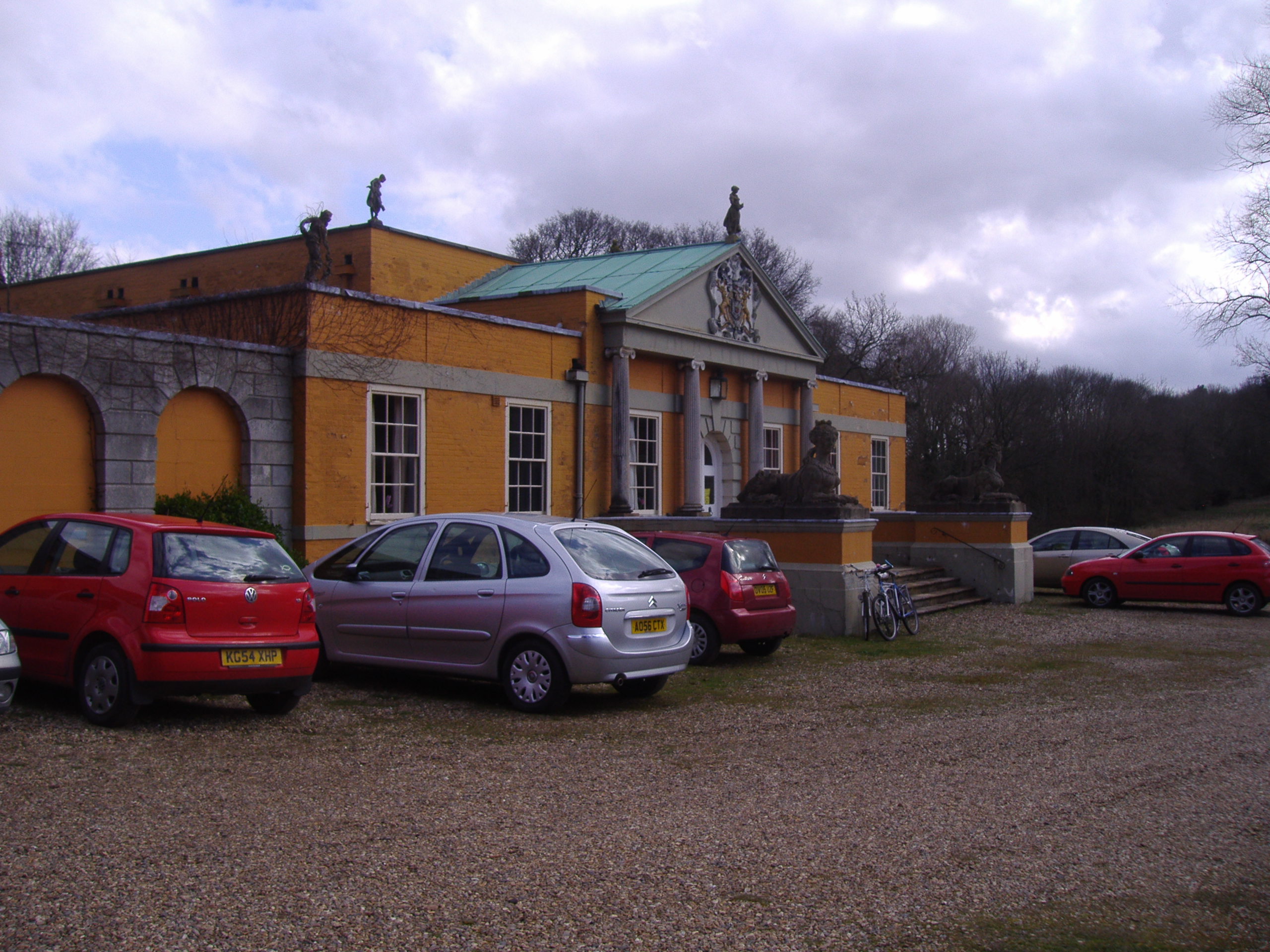
Templewood House

== Wildlife ==
Wildlife that can be seen in the locality include:

Birds

- Barn owl, buzzard, wood pigeon, kingfisher, tawny owl, heron

Animals

- Rabbit, hare, hedgehog, mole, Chinese water deer, red deer, muntjac deer, fallow deer, badger, pipistrelle bat, grey squirrel

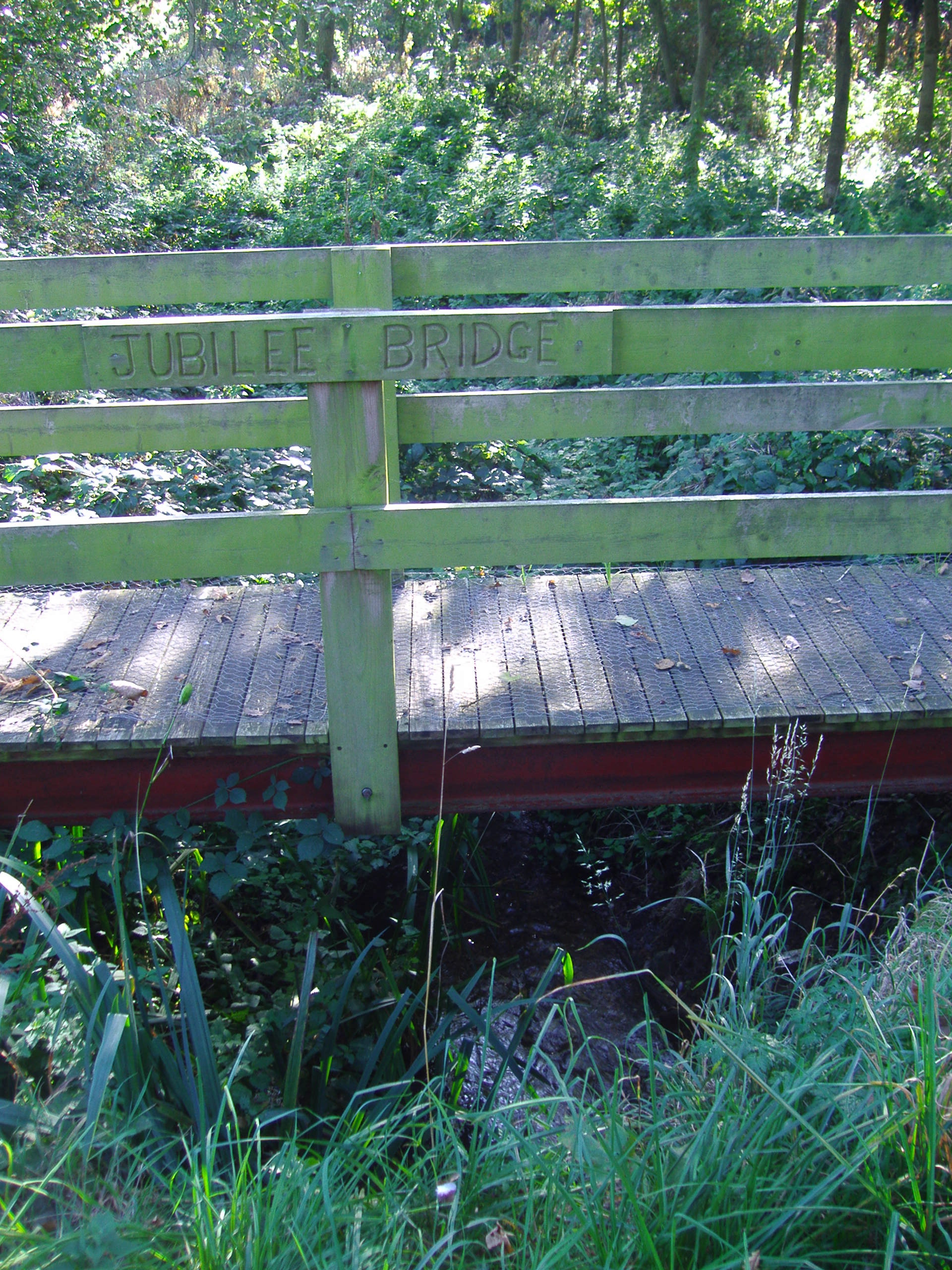
Jubilee Bridge

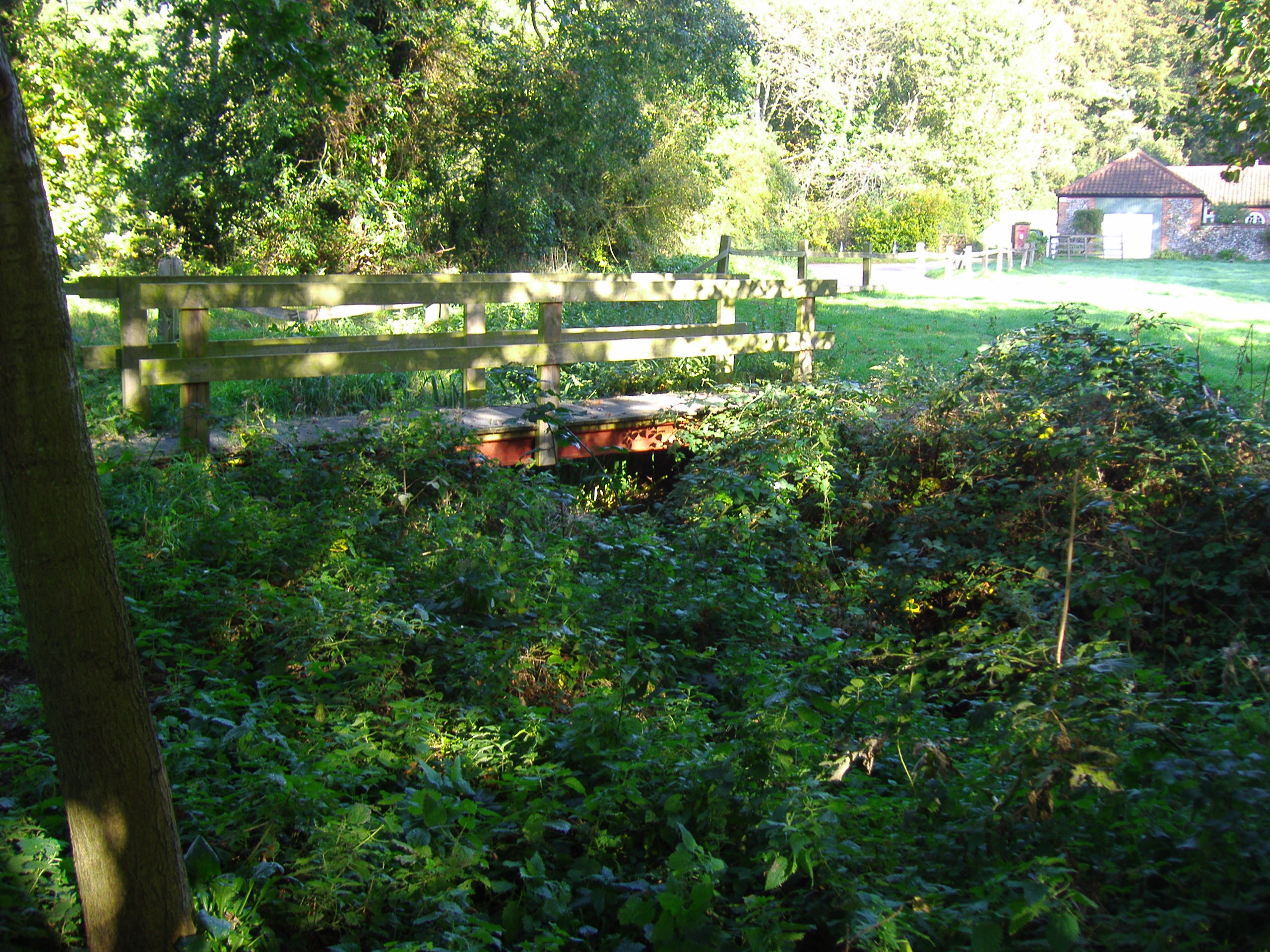
River Mun close to its source

== Public transport ==
Bus

Services are provided by the following Sanders Coaches run between Cromer and North Walsham.

- Sanders coaches

== Notable residents ==
- Verily Anderson
- Paul Edward Paget
- Samuel Hoare, Lord Templewood
