= Northrepps =

Village in Norfolk, England

Coordinates: 52.902°N 1.338°E

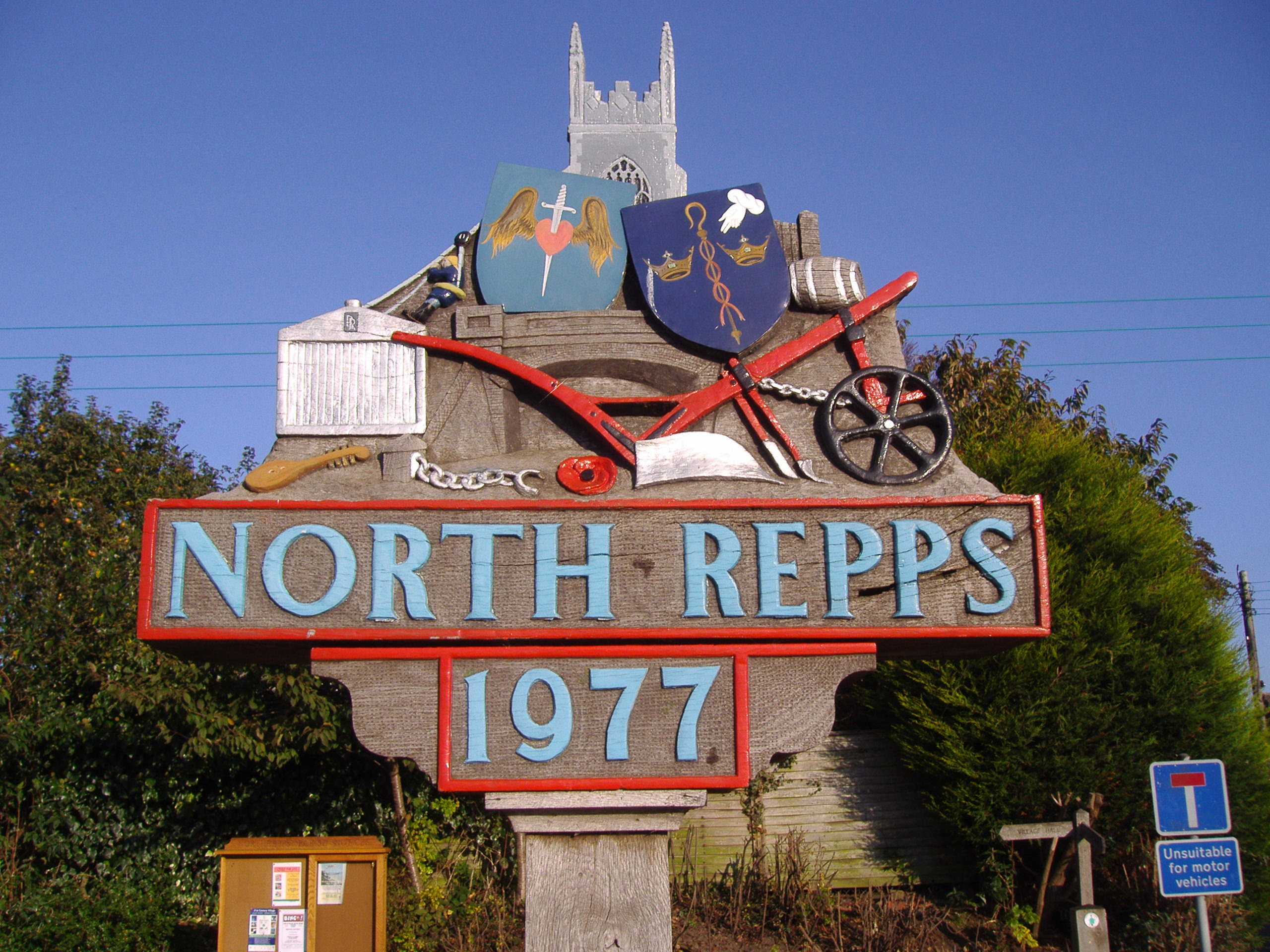
- The village sign

- Location within Norfolk
- Area: 10.65 km^{2} (4.11 sq mi)
- Population: 886 (parish, 2011 census)
  - Density: 83/km^{2} (210/sq mi)
- OS grid reference: TG245395
  - London: 136 miles
- Civil parish: Northrepps
- District: North Norfolk
- Shire county: Norfolk
- Region: East
- Country: England
- Sovereign state: United Kingdom
- Post town: CROMER
- Postcode district: NR27
- Dialling code: 01263
- Police: Norfolk
- Fire: Norfolk
- Ambulance: East of England
- UK Parliament: North Norfolk

Northrepps is a village and a civil parish in the English county of Norfolk. It is 3.4 miles (5.5 km) southeast of Cromer, 22.2 miles (35.7 km) north of Norwich and 137 miles (220 km) north of London. The village lies west of the A149 which runs between Kings Lynn and Great Yarmouth. The nearest railway station is at Cromer for the Bittern Line which runs between Sheringham, Cromer and Norwich. The nearest airport is Norwich International Airport. The village and parish of Northrepps had in the 2001 census a population of 839, increasing to 886 at the 2011 Census. For the purposes of local government, the village falls within the district of North Norfolk.

== Description ==
The parish of Northrepps was reduced in size in 1906, losing land to the parish of Overstrand which lies to the north. The parish boundary to the north-west is with Cromer, to the north-east with Sidestrand. To the west are the boundaries with Felbrigg and Roughton whilst to the south is the parish of Southrepps. At its nearest point the parish is just 500 metres from the coast on the north-eastern boundary, which partly follows the course of the disused Norfolk and Suffolk Joint Railway between Cromer and North Walsham, which closed in 1953. Also in the north of the parish is Cottage Wood, which is largely given over to the Forest Park Caravan Site.

In the south east of the parish there is more woodland known as Fox Hills, bounded around its south-west edge by the Paston Way footpath. The Bittern Line railway cuts through the western section of the parish. The landscape of the parish is largely arable farmland made up of low hills and valleys; the soil is light and very sandy and the subsoil gravel. The parish contains the village of Northrepps as well as Frogshall, which is in Fox Hills, and Crossdale Street, which straddles the A149 in the west of the parish. The A140 begins at a junction with the A149 within the parish. The name Northrepps is derived from the Old English word repel, meaning strips of land in a fen that can be tilled.

== History ==
Evidence suggested that the occupants of Northrepps have always been agriculturally based. This is confirmed by entries in the Domesday Book of 1086, which has the village's name listed as Norhrepes and Norrepes. The main tenant was William de Warenne. The survey shows that the value of the parish was reasonably low. The survey also state that there was 1 free man of Ketel's, at 30 acres (12 ha) of land. Always 2 villagers, 5 smallholders, pannage for 5 swine, always 1 plough, 2 acres (0.81 ha) of meadow 2 mills and 1 church, at 18 acres (7.3 ha). Value always 10s. The listing of the mills confirms the central role of farming in the community. In the Domesday Book the size of woodland was normally given as the number of swine a wood could support, in this case pannage for 5 swine.

=== 19th century ===
By 1881 records show that the parish was owned by three landlords. John Henry Gurney Sr was the principal owner, Lord Suffield was lord of the manor and Sir Samuel Hoare was the third. The manor of Northrepps therefore seems to have been governed by the Suffield family from 18th-century Gunton Hall in the parish of Hanworth, 5 kilometres (3.1 mi) south of Northrepps village. Gurney, who was the principal landowner, was at that time resident at Northrepps Hall, not actually a hall or manor house but a converted farmhouse with a largely 19th-century exterior. The Hall is now a Grade II listed building.

=== The Foundry ===
The village once had a foundry, best remembered for developing the Gallus plough in 1830. This design of plough was widely used well into the 1920s. There is an example of a Gallus plough manufactured at the foundry on display in the parish church.

=== Smuggling ===
The village once had a gang of smugglers, whose leader allegedly was a member of the large Summers family, hence his nickname Old Summers. Local folklore tells of the time that his gang tied up the chief 'prevention' officer to a post while they disposed of their contraband. A local woman called Sally Bean, who lived in a cottage on Shucks Hill, was an ally of the smuggling ring. Her cottage had a 20-mile (32 km) view of the countryside on the south side of the village, which enabled her to give warnings to the smugglers of the 'prevention' men.

== Village amenities ==
=== The Primary School ===
Northrepps primary school is a feeder for Cromer Academy, currently has approximately 35 pupils and is maintained by the local authority. The school is twinned with a small school in the small village of St Laurent d'Olt in the Aveyron region of France. The school building was erected in 1879 and is a traditional flint-and-brick Victorian school. There is a first-floor extension housing the staff room and resources room. There is also a mobile classroom, used by the onsite Pre-School. In 2004 new offices, reception and entrance were added to the buildings.

The school has a playground with a small grass playing area with climbing equipment, built with funds raised by the children and parents. This area was surrounded by security fencing in 2004. The school also has the use of a large playing field across the road. There is also an ongoing adult education programme in the village, including a computer club at the school.

=== The Village Hall ===
The village hall was built in 1996 and hosts a variety of clubs and organisations.

=== The Foundry Arms ===
The village pub is located in Church Street, and is called the Foundry Arms. It is named after a once-famous foundry in the village.

== The parish church of Saint Mary ==
The parish church of Saint Mary the Virgin is on the south side of the village. The building is mainly 15th century but the chancel has two lancet windows that date from the 13th century. The rood screen was given to the church in 1460 by John Playford and his wife, Custance, their names being carved on its rail. The rood screen was at some time removed from the church and was found by the then rector of the church, John Cresswell, in a local barn. He had it restored to the church in 1912. The chancel has 14th-century arcades of four bays supported on octagonal piers and double-chamfered arches. The compact west tower has a western doorway. Above the doorway is a frieze of the royal arms with the lion and the unicorn. The label indicates that they are the arms of George III but they are actually the early Stuart arms of a century and a half earlier of Charles I. In the south aisle the early-20th-century east window depicts the archangels Gabriel, Michael and Raphael with a host of angels above them. The chancel also has some surviving Norman windows and zig-zag. On top of the church the weather vane depicts the Gallus plough produced at the old foundry, which was given by a local man, John Golden, who had connections with the foundry.

== Gallery ==
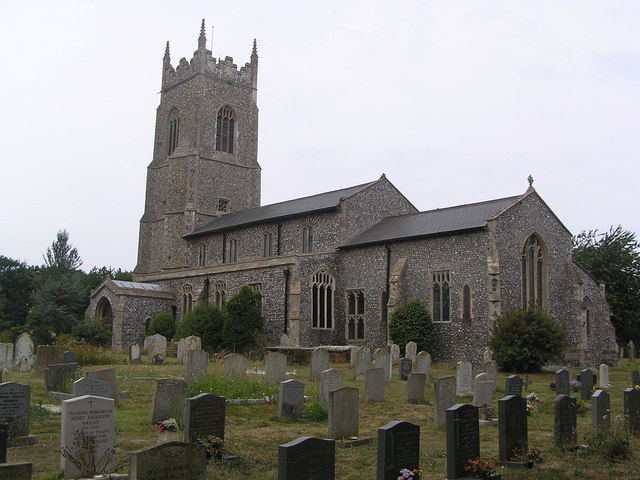
Northrepps Parish Church (St Mary’s)

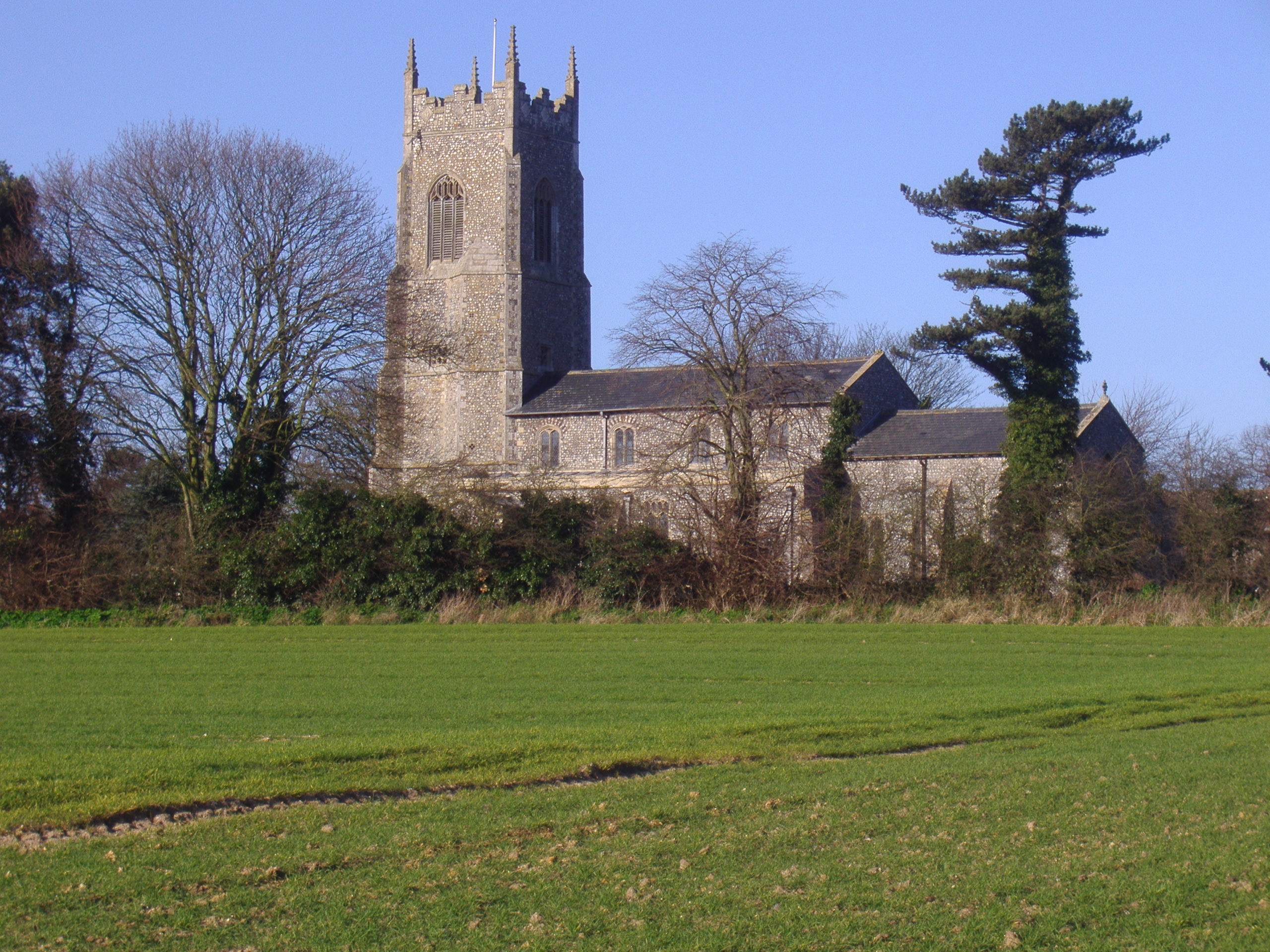
Northrepps Parish Church

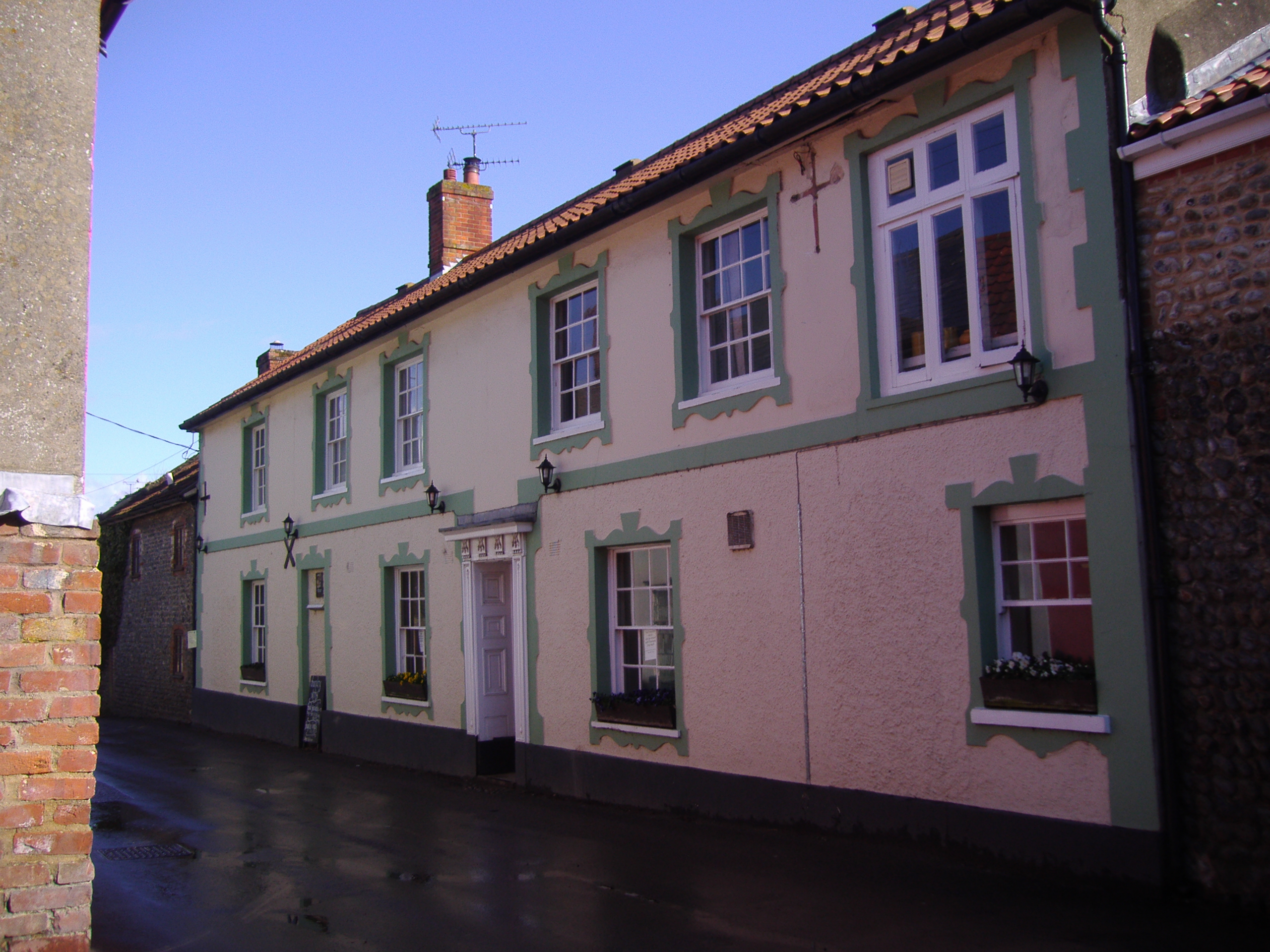
The Foundry Arms

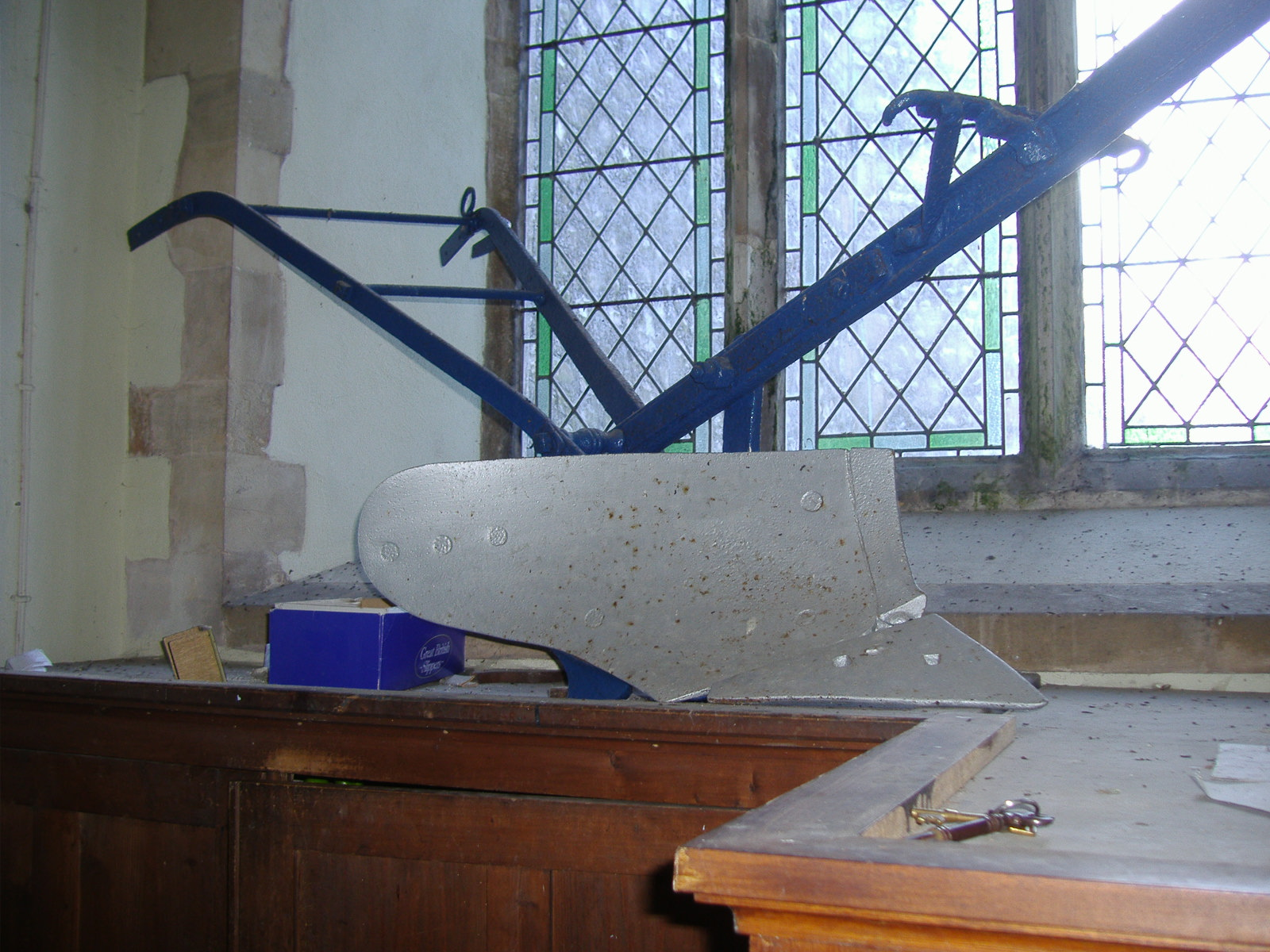
A Gallus plough, on display in the parish church

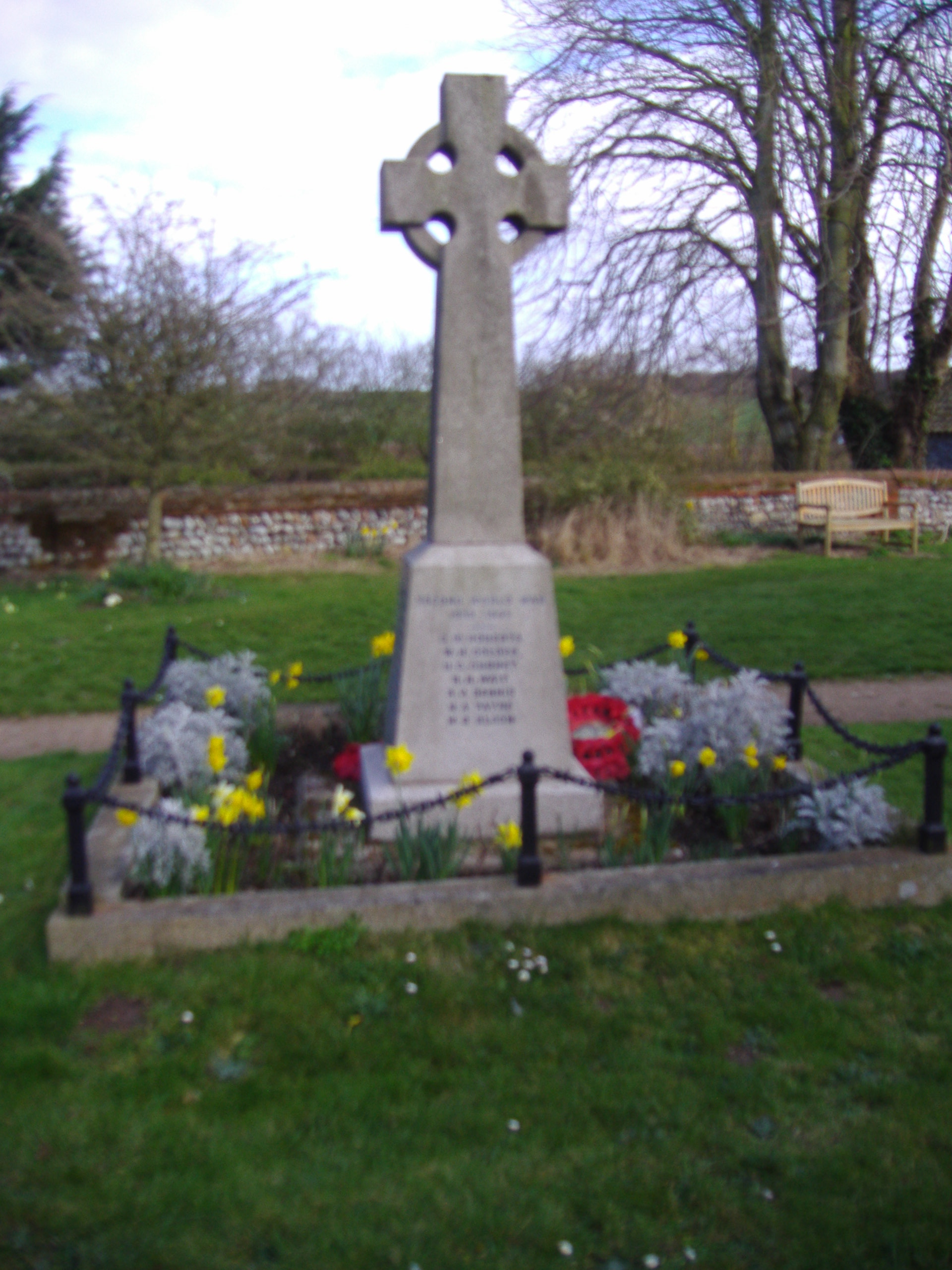
Northrepps War Memorial

== See also ==
- Northrepps Aerodrome
- River Mun
- Frogshall, a hamlet within the parish
- Verily Anderson, author of the Northrepps Grandchildren
