= Brian Thomas (church artist) =

British painter (1912–1989)

Brian Thomas (1912–1989) OBE was a British artist best known for his decorative work in church buildings, particularly murals and stained glass.

== Biography ==
Brian Thomas was born in Barnstaple, Devon, on 19 September 1912 to Frank and Margaret (née Lauder). He was educated at Bradfield College and awarded a science scholarship to study at Oxford University. He chose instead to attend the Byam Shaw School of Art in London. There he won a scholarship to the British School at Rome to study mural painting and travelled widely in Italy and Spain. During the war, he worked in the camouflage section of Home Security. From 1946 to 1954, he was principal of the Byam Shaw School of Art. He was a Master of the Art Workers Guild (1957) and a Master of the Worshipful Company of Glaziers and Painters of Glass. In 1961 he was awarded the Order of the British Empire (OBE). He died on 13 December 1989, and a memorial service was held at St Giles in the Fields in London.

A ‘Brian Thomas Memorial Prize’ (worth £2000 in 2018) is awarded by the Worshipful Company of Glaziers and Painters of Glass as part of its annual Stevens Competition for Architectural Glass.

== Iconography ==
A photograph of Thomas at work in his studio in St John's Wood, London, taken about 1955 by Chris Ware (Keystone Features) can be found in the Getty Images online database. It shows him painting glass panels for newly commissioned altar rails at St George's Chapel, Windsor Castle. The chapel's altar-rails project is described, with images of the panels themselves, in the December 1956 Report of the Society of the Friends of St George's and Descendants of the Knights of the Garter

== List of works ==
- All Hallows by the Tower, London. Murai: The Last Supper.
- All Saints, Compton, Hampshire. Stained glass: Madonna and Child and Deposition.
- Bangor Cathedral, Wales. Murals:'The Risen Christ and Two Disciples Reach Emmaus on Easter Evening', with two others at the west end.(1934).
- Brown's Cake Shop, Banbury, Oxfordshire. Mural depicting the history of Banbury. (1947); subsequently displayed in Banbury's Castle Quay Shopping Centre.
- 43 Cloth Fair, London. Mural 'The Sailor's Home Coming'.
- Fulham Palace, London. Murals: in the Chapel (1953).
- Innholders Hall, London. Stained glass: The Three Masters Window, a collaborative work designed and made by 3 past masters of the Worshipful Company of Glaziers and Painters of Glass, specifically: Brian Thomas, Michael Farrar-Bell and Lawrence Lee.
- St Andrew, Holborn, London. Mural and stained glass, each depicting doves.
- St Andrew and St George, Stevenage. Stained glass: The Christian Year.
- St Edward, New Addington, London. Stained glass: St. Edward and Symbols of Kingship, incorporating images of Melchizedek, Hezekiah, David and Solomon.
- St George's Chapel, Windsor Castle. Six stained glass panels in the altar rails, 1955.
  - A collaboration with architects Seely & Paget.
- St John the Baptist Church, Peterborough. Stained glass (1968) depicting notable people connected to Peterborough: Symon Gunton, vicar of the parish during the plague, between 1665 and 1667 (d.1676), Nurse Edith Cavell (d. 1915), Captain Thomas Mellows (d. 1944, fighting in the French Resistance), and William Law (d. 1761).
- St John, Clerkenwell, London. Priory chapel stained glass: Arms of Lord Webb-Johnson.
  - A collaboration with architects Seely & Paget.
- St John the Divine, Kennington, London. Murals, showing The Virgin Mary and Jesus in a Floral Garden, Lilies and Roses, Pièta. (1966).
- St John the Divine, Selsdon, London. Stained glass.
- St Laurence, Tidmarsh, Berkshire. Stained glass depicting 22 scenes from the life of a deceased benefactor.
- St Margaret, Ifield, Kent. Stained glass.
- St Mark's, Regent's Park. Stained glass: St Peter and St Mark (1957).
- St Mary Islington, London. Murals: Judgement and Eight Attributes of Christ, (c.1956).
  - A collaboration with architects Seely & Paget.
- St Mary, Long Ditton, Surrey. Stained glass: Annunciation.
- St Mary, Maidenhead. Stained glass: Serpent of Paradise, Serpent of Healing, Sword of Spirit, Local scenes & connections, Suffer little children, Prodigal Son.
- St Mary the Virgin, Twickenham. Stained glass depicting symbols of the Virgin Mary.
- St Michael and St George, White City, London. Mural above the high altar (1954).
  - A collaboration with architects Seely & Paget.
- St Michael, Sutton Court, Chiswick, London. Stained glass: Samuel.
- St Nicholas & All Hallows, Poplar, London. Ceiling paintings, first seen at the 1948 Lambeth Conference.
  - A collaboration with architects Seely & Paget.
- St Paul's Cathedral, London. Stained glass for the American and OBE chapels.
- St Paul's Cathedral, Wellington. Stained glass: St Paul at the Areopagus (various windows, depicting scenes of the saint's life).
- St Paul's Church, Bedford. Stained glass in celebration of the 400th anniversary of the Harpur Trust. (1976).
- St Sepulchre without Newgate, London. Stained glass: Musicians window (Dame Nellie Melba, John Ireland, Sir Henry Wood and Walter Carroll.
- St Stephen, Canonbury Road, Canonbury, London. Reredos depicting the martyrdom of St Stephen.
- St Vedast, Foster Lane, London. Stained glass: Scenes from the life of St Vedast. (1961).
- Templewood House, Frogshall, Northrepps, Norfolk. Ceiling painting (1964) depicting scenes from the life of Paul Paget.
  - A collaboration with architects Seely & Paget.
- Westminster Abbey, London, Stained glass: Six Acts of Mercy in lancet windows below the north transept rose window.

== Gallery ==
Works by Brian Thomas.
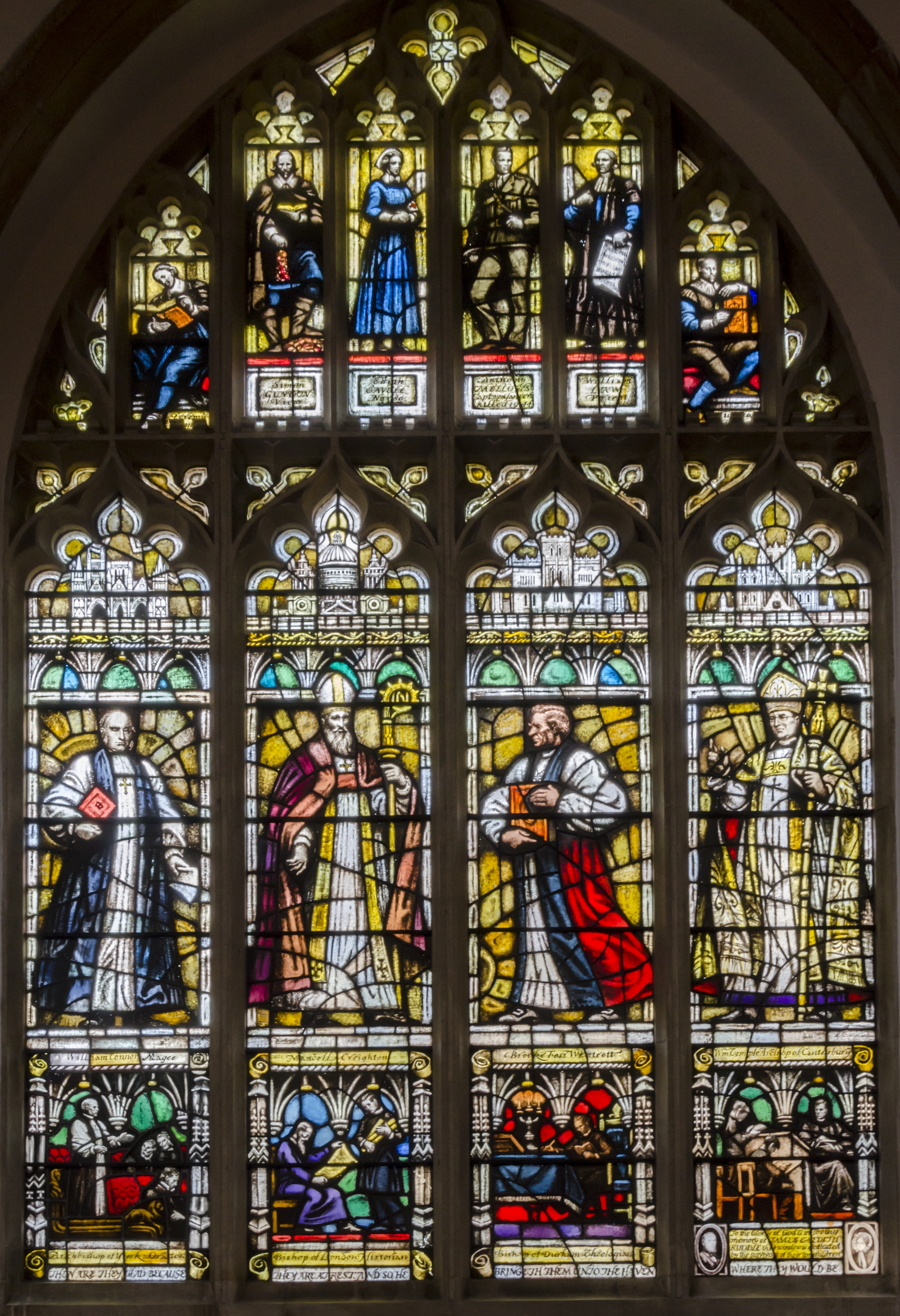
Sianed glass, St John the Baptist Church, Peterborough

Detail of the Banbury mural

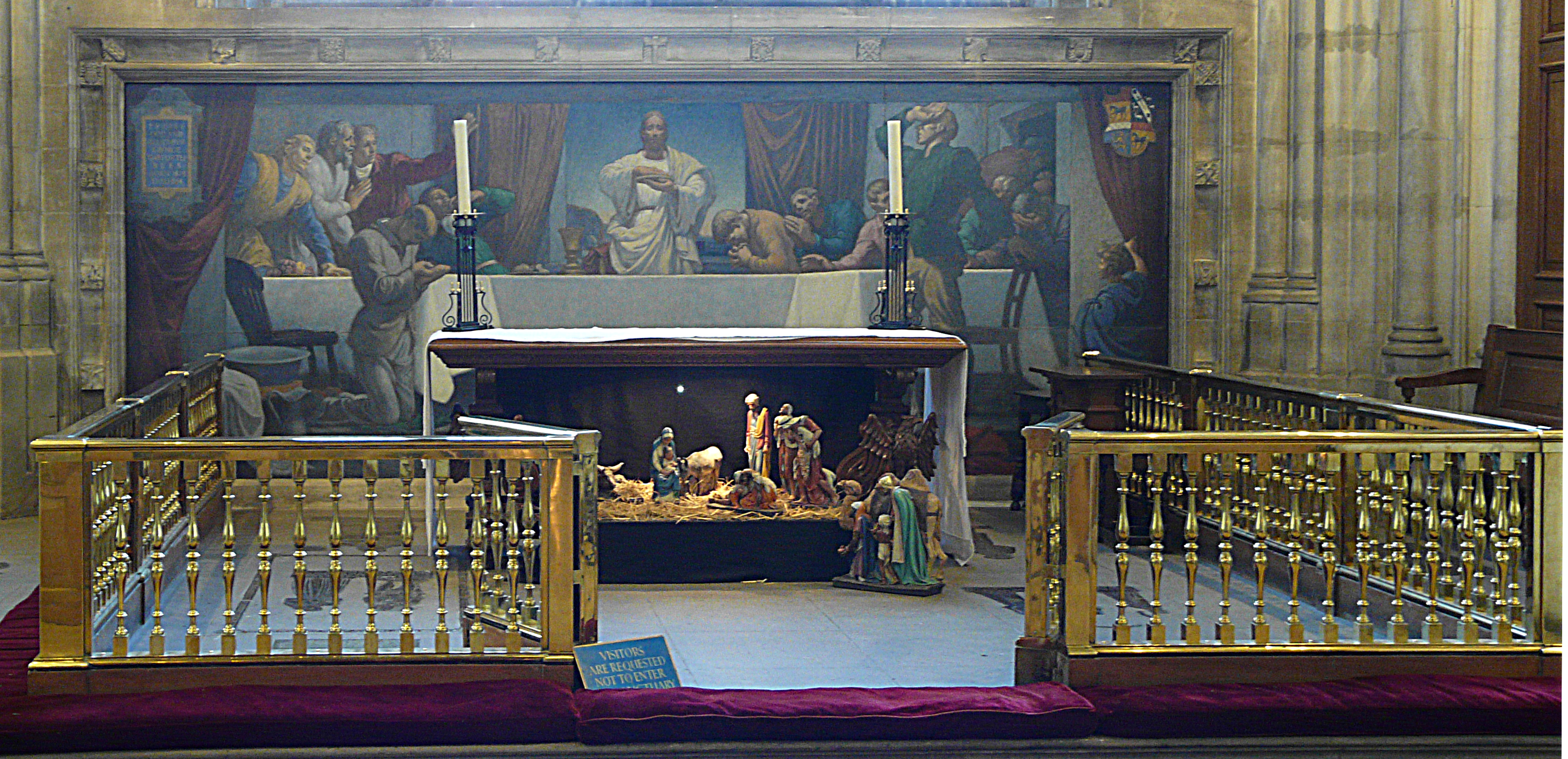
Mural 'The Last Supper' in All Hallows by the Tower, London. –

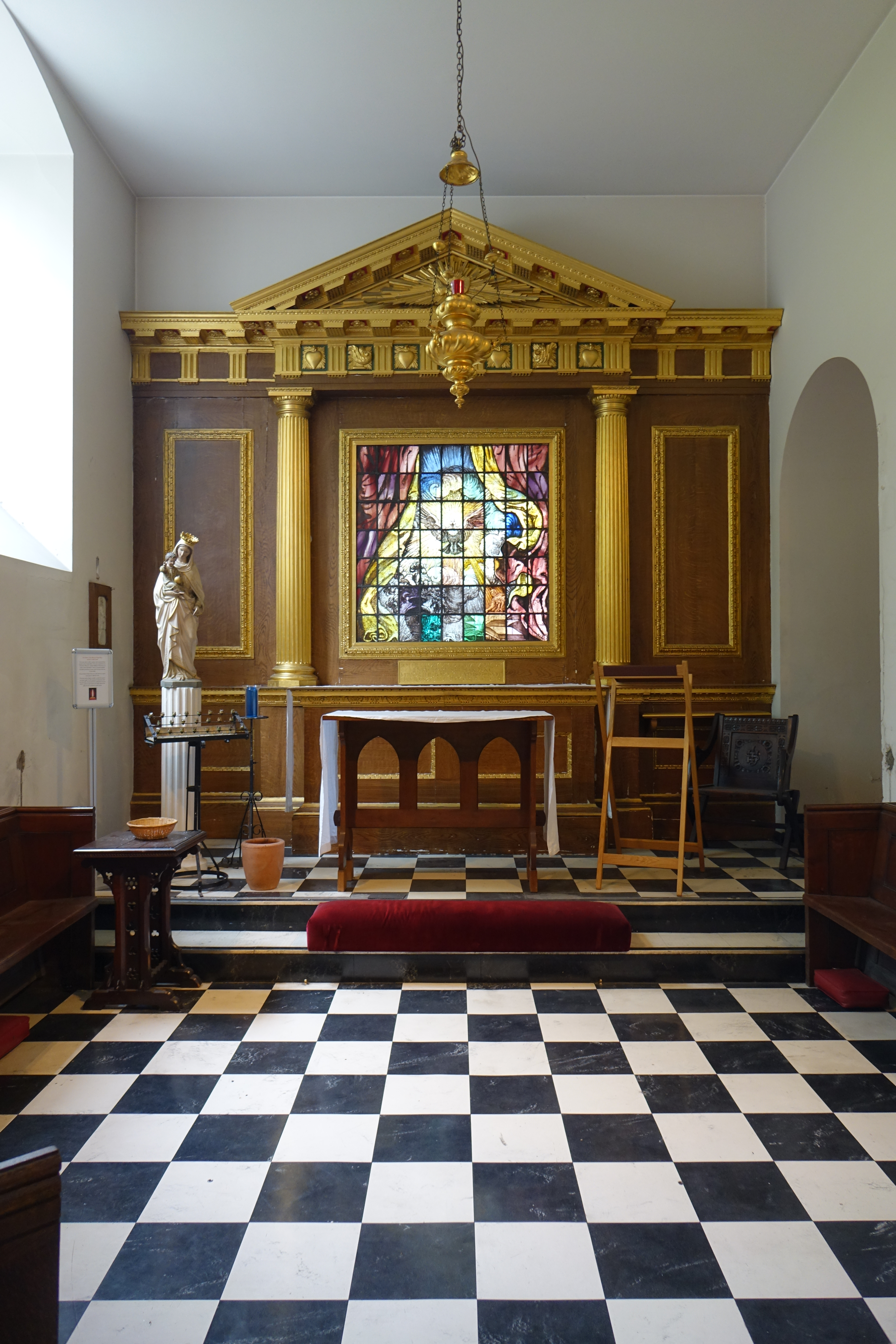
Stained glass, St Andrew Hoborn, London.

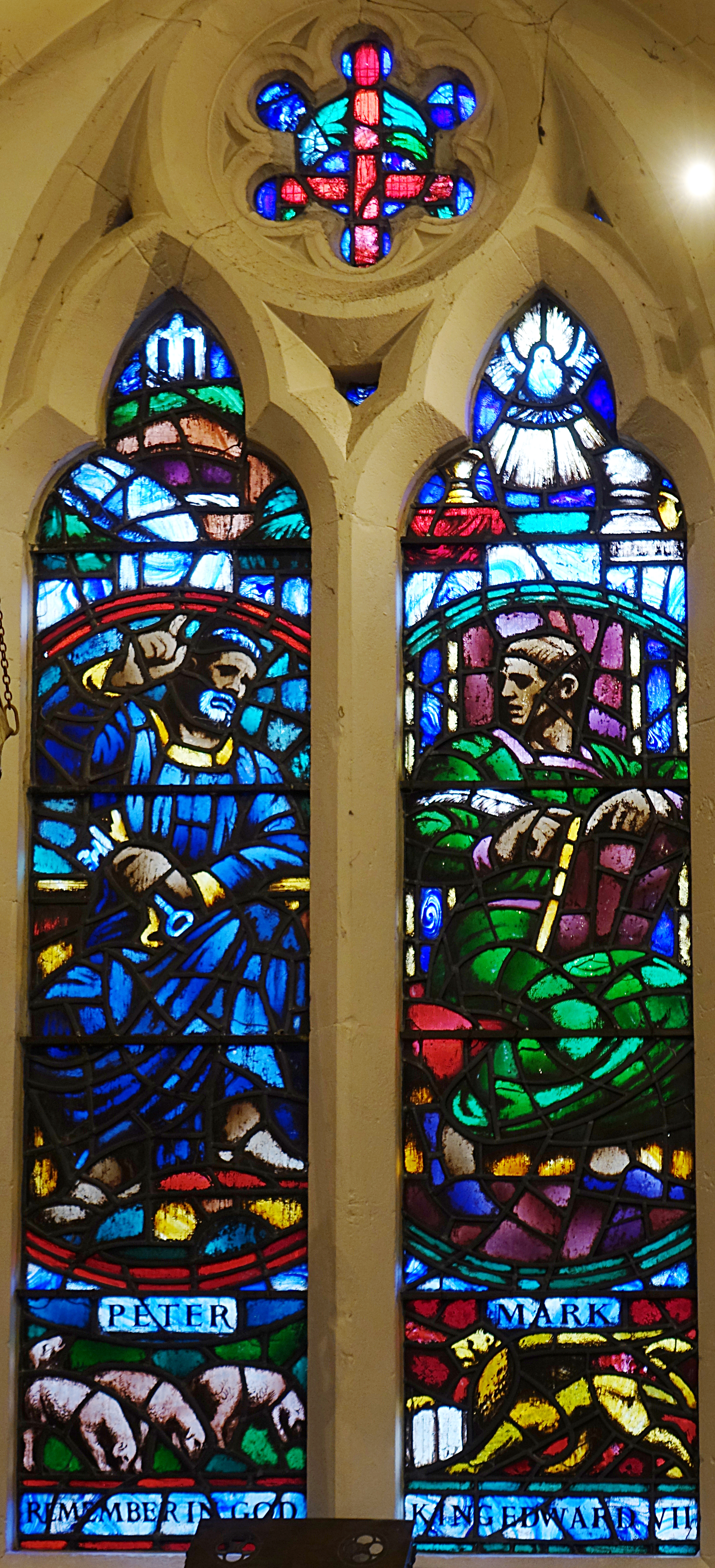
Stained glass, St Mark's Regent's Park, London.

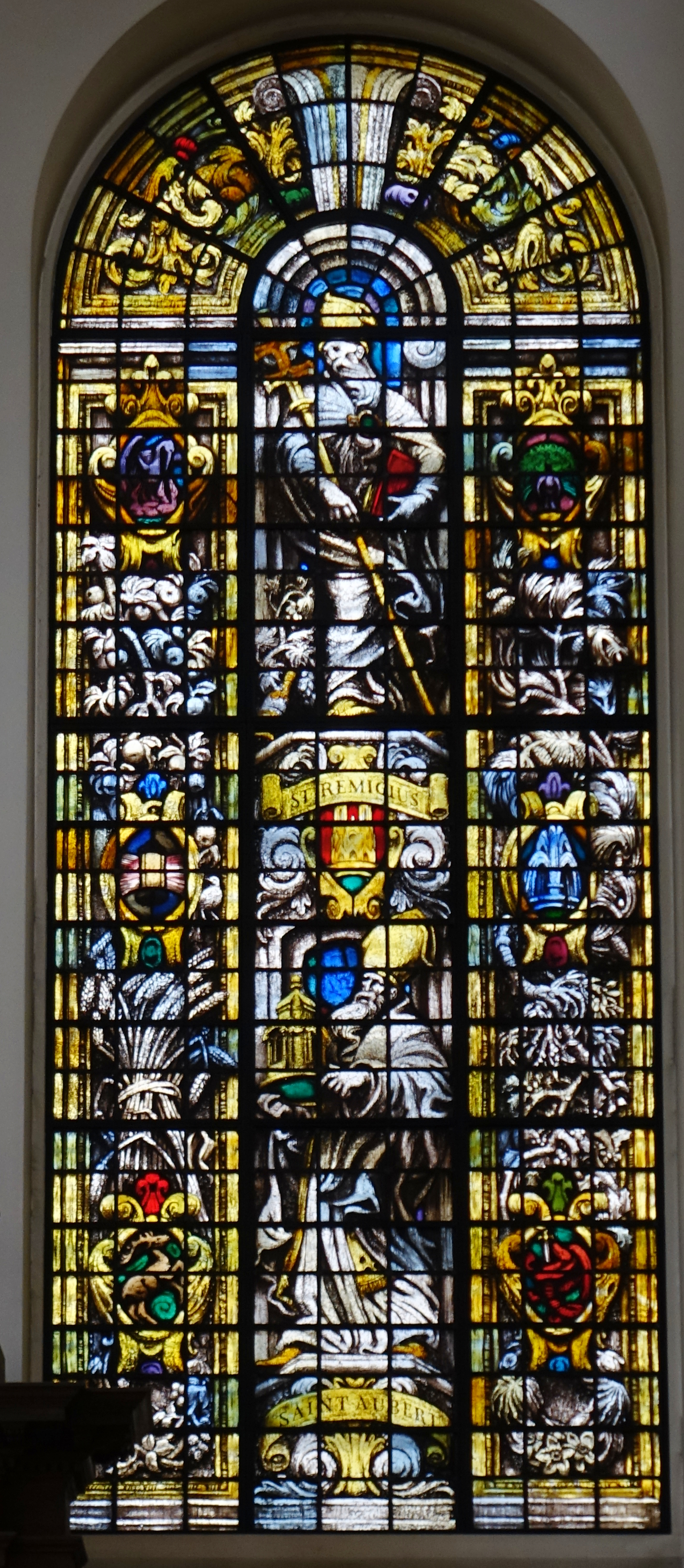
Stained glass, St Vedast Foster Lane, London. –

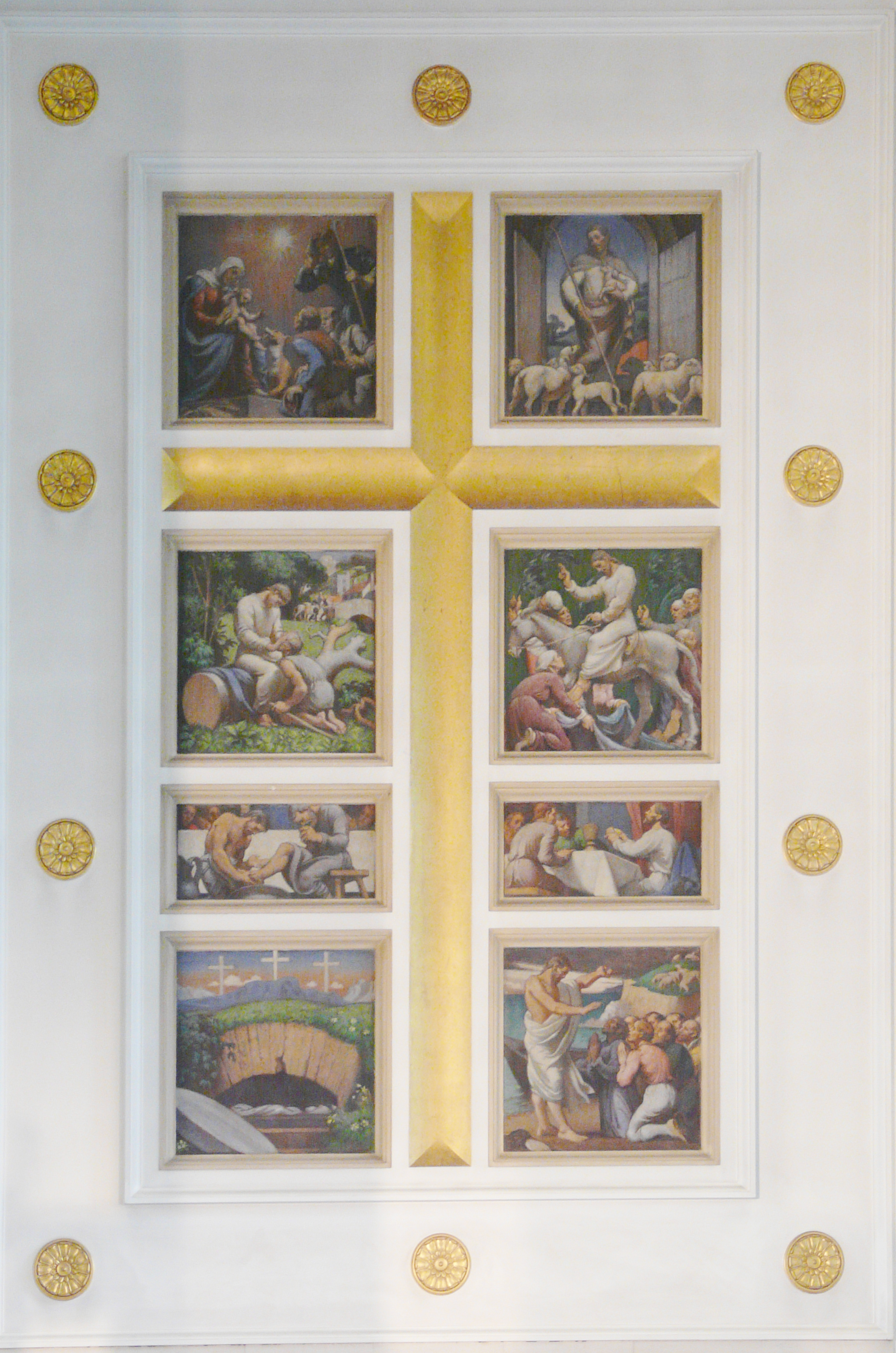
Mural, St Mary Islington, London.

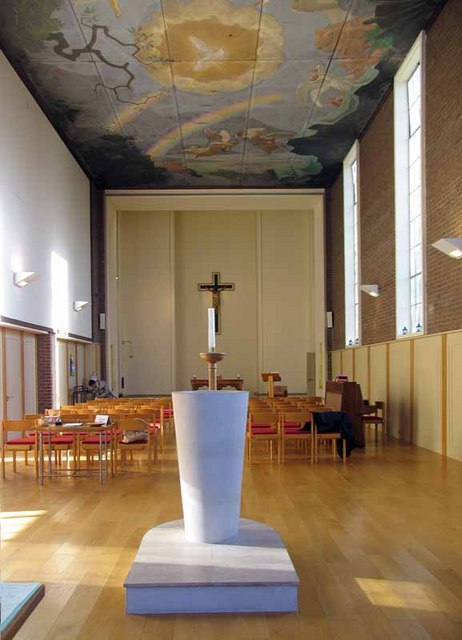
Ceiling, St. Nicholas & All Hallows, Poplar.

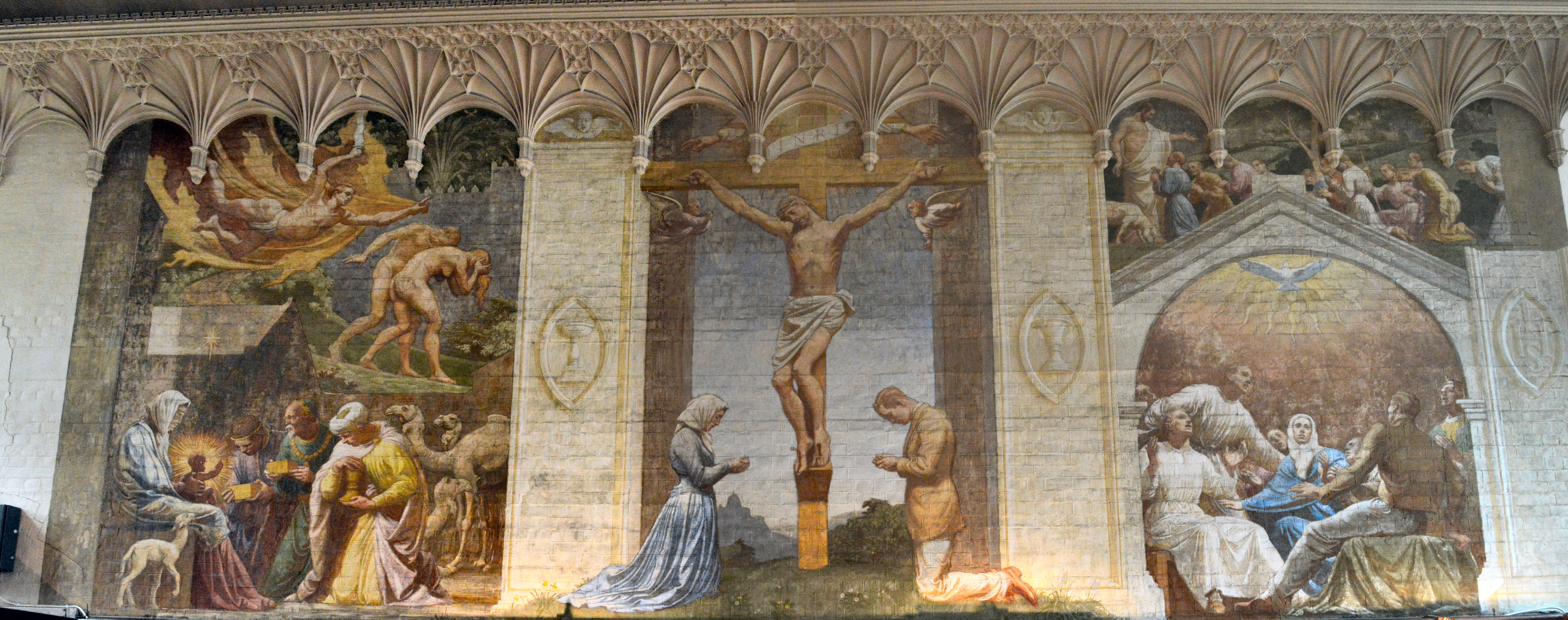
Fulham Palace, London, The Tait Chapel north-wall mural.

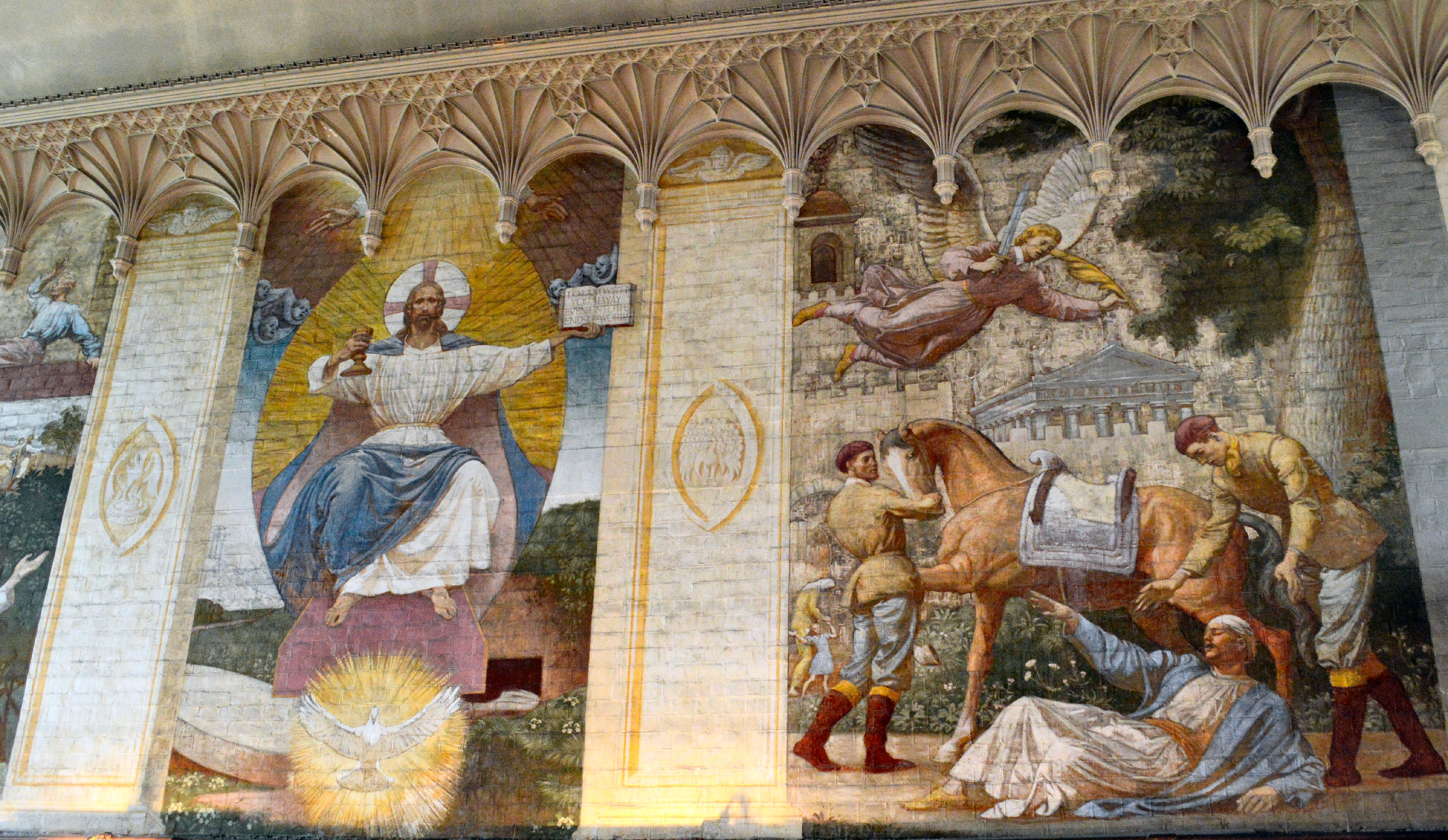
Fulham Palace, London, The Tait Chapel south-wall mural.
