= Iyad Sughayer =

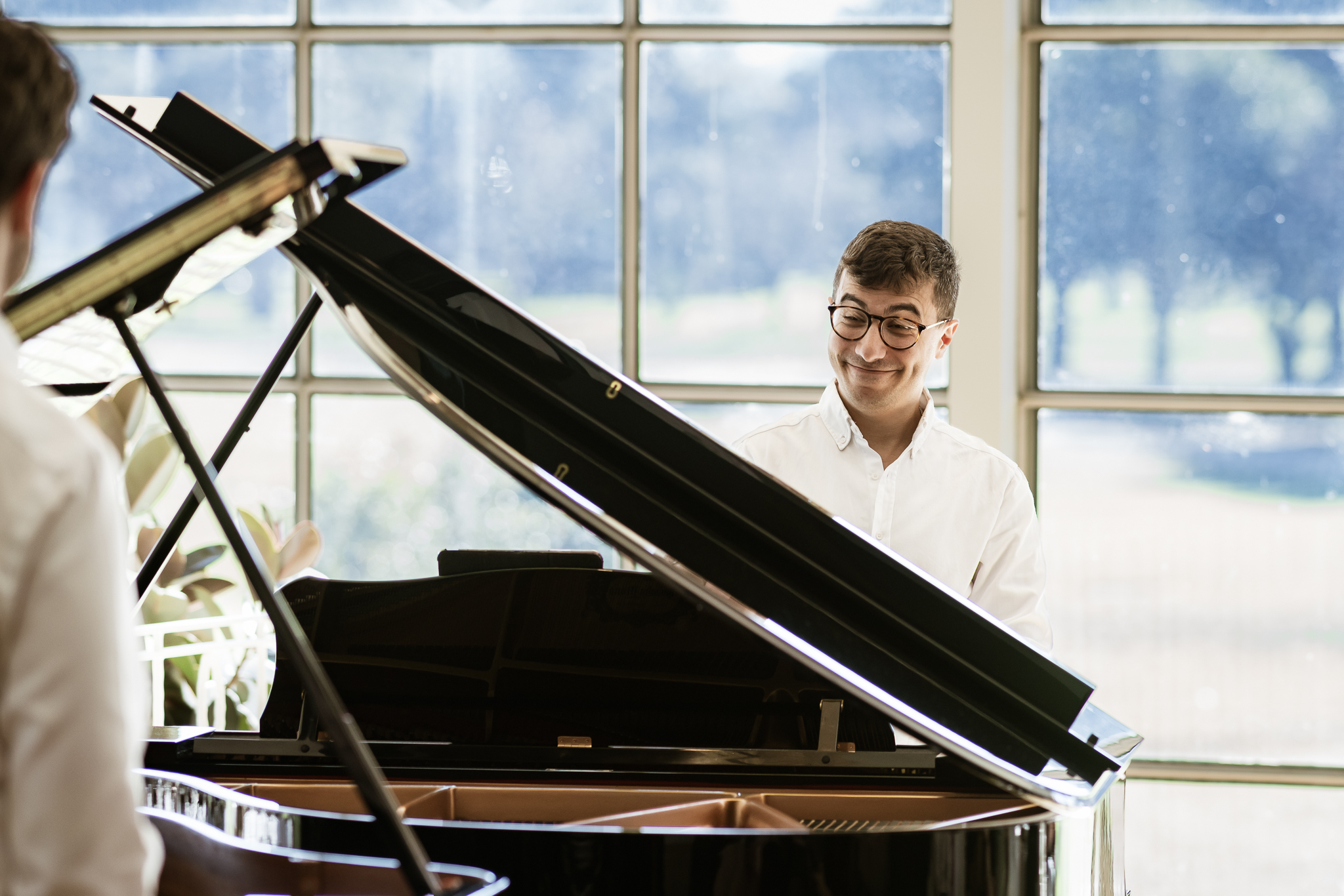
- Born: 16 October 1993 (age 32); Amman, Jordan
- Education: National Music Conservatory (Amman, Jordan), Chetham's School of Music (UK)
- Alma mater: Royal Northern College of Music, Trinity Laban Conservatoire of Music and Dance
- Occupation: Classical pianist
- Notable work: Khachaturian – Piano Works
- Awards: Trinity Laban 2018 Gold Medalist; City Music Foundation Artist 2019
- Website: iyadsughayer.com

Iyad Sughayer (Arabic: إياد الصغًير; born 16 October 1993 in Amman) is a Jordanian-Palestinian classical pianist.

Sughayer started playing the piano at the age of five and studied at the National Music Conservatory (NMC) in Amman, Jordan. He was taught by the composer and conductor of the Amman Symphony Orchestra, Muhammed Othman Sidiq. From 2008, he studied at Chetham's School of Music in Manchester, England, with Murray McLachlan and Marie-Louise Taylor. He graduated from the Royal Northern College of Music as a scholar in Manchester and from the Trinity Laban Conservatoire of Music and Dance in London.

Sughayer has participated in many concerts outside Jordan, including in Cyprus, Italy, and Lithuania. In the United Kingdom, he has performed at Manchester Cathedral. He has played with orchestras including the Amman Symphony Orchestra, the BBC Philharmonic Orchestra, the Cairo Symphony Orchestra, the European Union Chamber Orchestra, and the Manchester Camerata.

Sughayer is an artist with the City Music Foundation. He was the Trinity Laban 2018 Gold Medalist. He has studied with Martino Tirimo and Peter Tuite. In 2019, his debut album with BIS Records was released, featuring piano works by the Armenian composer Aram Khachaturian (1903–1978).
