= St John the Baptist Church, Peterborough =

- Peterborough Parish Church
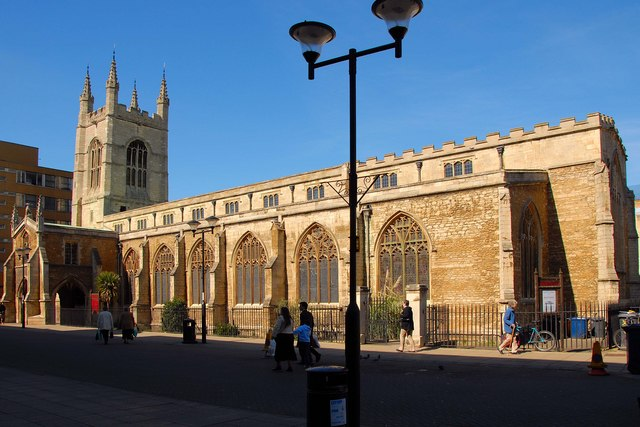
- St John the Baptist Church from Church Street
- St John the Baptist Church, Peterborough
- 52.5727°N 0.2439°W
- Location: Peterborough, Cambridgeshire
- Country: England
- Denomination: Church of England
- Churchmanship: Central

History
- Dedication: St John the Baptist

Architecture
- Heritage designation: Grade I listed
- Designated: 1952

Administration
- Province: Province of Canterbury
- Diocese: Diocese of Peterborough
- Archdeaconry: Archdeaconry of Oakham
- Deanery: Deanery of Peterborough
- Parish: St John the Baptist, Peterborough

Clergy
- Vicar: The Revd Michelle Dalliston

St John the Baptist Church is a Grade I listed Church of England parish church in the city of Peterborough, now Cambridgeshire, England.

== Location ==
The present St John the Baptist Church is situated in Cathedral Square and is only a few minutes walk away from Peterborough Cathedral. This seemingly strange state of affairs is due to the fact that the cathedral was for the monks and the church for the townspeople. It is officially designated as Peterborough's parish church and, as such, its vicar bears the title of the Vicar of Peterborough. There are several other Anglican churches throughout the city.

== History ==
The original parish church, dating from the 11th century, was some distance to the east of the current location, on the site now occupied by Bishop Creighton Academy. When the centre of Peterborough moved west, the church was relocated stone by stone. Construction of the current church began in 1402 and it was dedicated to St John the Baptist on 26 June 1407.

Two royal funerals took place at the nearby Cathedral during the 16th century, Katherine of Aragon (1536) and Mary, Queen of Scots (1587). They were both buried by the same sexton of St John's, Robert Scarlett and the bells of St John's Church rang for both funerals.

Following the English Civil War, in 1651 permission was granted by Parliament to demolish the church and use it as building materials, though the plan did not go ahead.

Restoration in 1819 'brutally swept away' old features and added clerestory and galleries. In 1882-3 John Loughborough Pearson provided new roofs, new clerestory, aisle parapets, and tracery. The galleries were removed, the east window unblocked and raised, floors lowered and a new pulpit added. This restoration work was for Revd Henry Syers and designed in 1880. The builder was John Thompson and the cost was £11,000.

The church was refurnished in High Anglican manner in 1938 and incorporated a new rood and elaborately painted and gilded timber reredos with carved figures under heavily traceried canopies. The figures were carved by Mahomet Thomas Phillips while working at Bowman & Sons of Stamford.

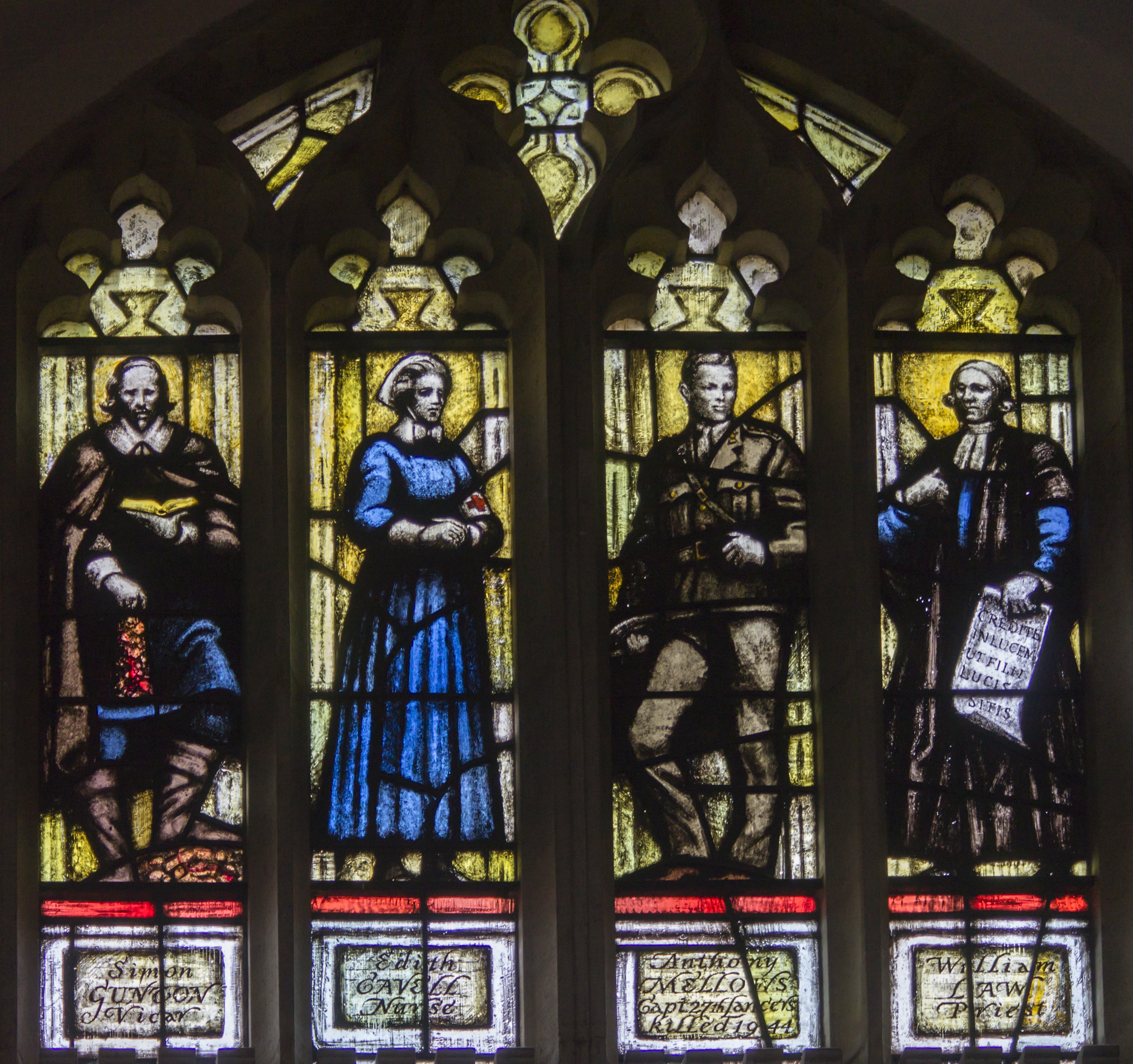
Window by Brian Thomas in St John the Baptist, Peterborough

In 1968 a new stained-glass window, designed by Brian Thomas, was installed. It depicts notable people connected to Peterborough: Symon Gunton, vicar of the parish during the plague, between 1665 and 1667 (d.1676), Nurse Edith Cavell (d. 1915), Captain Thomas Mellows (d. 1944, fighting in the French Resistance), and William Law (d. 1761). The window is dedicated to James Ruddle (1830-1898) and to his wife Edith. James Ruddle was a prominent local architect who worked extensively in the Peterborough area and was the son of local carpenter Francis Ruddle.

St John the Baptist received a Grade I heritage listing in 1952 as a prominent and "architecturally ambitious parish church... exemplifying Perpendicular town church design." Its "very fine" south porch, 15th century font, 20th century screens, interesting monuments and tombs were also noted.
