= Islington Church Act 1750 =

Act of the Parliament of Great Britain

- Act of Parliament
- Parliament of Great Britain
- Long title: An Act to enable the Parishioners of the Parish of Saint Mary, Islington, in the County of Middlesex, to rebuild the Church of the said Parish.
- Citation: 24 Geo. 2. c. 15
- Territorial extent: Great Britain

Dates
- Royal assent: 22 May 1751
- Commencement: 17 January 1751 (Note: Start of session.)
- Repealed: 31 January 2013

Other legislation
- Repealed by: Statute Law (Repeals) Act 2013

Status: Repealed

Text of statute as originally enacted

The Islington Church Act 1750 (24 Geo. 2. c. 15) was an act of the Parliament of Great Britain.

== Purpose of the act ==
According to its long title, the purpose of the act was to enable the parishioners of the parish of Saint Mary, Islington, in the County of Middlesex, to rebuild the church of the said parish.

The church of St Mary the Virgin is situated in Upper Street, Islington. A church has stood on this site since the twelfth century. The original church was re-built in 1483, 1754 and finally in 1956.

The 1754 rebuild was designed by Lancelot Dowbiggin, a London joiner, and the old church was demolished in 1751 by contractor Samuel Steemson, who brought down the tower using explosives. The new church, consecrated on 26 May 1754, was a plain brick rectangle with stone quoins and dressings, described as not strictly conforming to any particular architectural style. A Portland stone portico with Ionic columns was added in 1903 by architect Reginald Blomfield. On 9 September 1940, during the Blitz, a bomb destroyed the nave while the tower and steeple survived. The church was rebuilt between 1954 and 1956 to designs by the architectural partnership of Seely and Paget, and is today a Grade II listed building.

The preamble to the 1750 act recorded that the whole of the church "is now in a very ruinous Condition".

== Provisions ==
The 1750 act provided as follows-

- (a) authorised the Trustees appointed under the Act to pull down the old church and steeple and re-build the same
- (b) fees charged for funerals, bell-ringing and the use of palls at funerals were to be used for the re-building works
- (c) appointment of Trustees to carry out this Act; Trustees authorised to levy and enforce payment of the rates and duties authorised by this Act
- (d) appointment of collectors and receivers of the rates and duties to be raised under this Act; duties of collectors and penalties for default
- (e) the Trustees were authorised to raise up to £7,000 by selling annuities; annuities to be charged on the rates; assignment of annuities
- (f) the Trustees were authorised to levy and collect rates to meet any short fall in the rates and duties chargeable under this Act resulting in insufficient moneys with which to pay the annuities; such rates to be payable by owners and occupiers of parish land; special provisions for properties let out
- (g) appointment of replacement trustees; disqualification of Trustees
- (h) rates chargeable under this Act to commence on 24 June 1751 and to cease when all the annuities had been paid off
- (i) Trustees authorised to sell and dispose of the remains of the old church;temporary tabernacle to be built to serve as a place of worship during the church re-building
- (j) Trustees required to keep records of all payments and receipts and to make such records available for inspection
- (k) Act not to affect private graves, gravestones or vaults, or the rights of the vicar and his successors in relation to the chancel of the old or the new church
- (l) civil procedure issues and status of this Act.

== Subsequent developments ==
In 2011, The Law Commission consulted on its proposal to repeal the act, stating that, "The 1750 Act no longer serves any useful purpose. It was passed to facilitate the re-building of St Mary’s Church, Islington. That objective was achieved in 1754 when the building works were completed and the new church was opened. The provisions in the Act for raising local rates ended when the final annuity secured by the rates had come to an end. That would have been no later than 1790 or thereabouts. The 1750 Act is accordingly obsolete and its repeal is proposed on that basis."

The whole act was repealed by section 1 of, and the group 1 of part 6 of the schedule to, the Statute Law (Repeals) Act 2013, which came into force on 31 January 2013.
