= St Mark's Church, Regent's Park =

Church in Regent's Park, London

- Church of St Mark Regent's Park
- St Mark's Church, Regent's Park
- 51.5379°N 0.1522°W
- Country: England
- Denomination: Church of England

History
- Status: Active
- Founded: 1848
- Dedication: Saint Mark
- Consecrated: 1853

Architecture
- Functional status: Parish church
- Heritage designation: Grade II listed
- Designated: 14 May 1974
- Architect(s): Thomas Little; Arthur Blomfield; Arthur Bedford Knapp-Fisher
- Style: Gothic Revival
- Years built: 1851 - 1852

Administration
- Diocese: London

St. Mark's Church, Regent's Park is a parish church located in Primrose Hill in the London Borough of Camden, close to the north-eastern boundary of Regent's Park. A Church of England establishment, it is part of the deanery of Camden within the Diocese of London. The church's proximity to London Zoo accounts for the nickname ‘The Zoo Church’. It is listed Grade II on the National Heritage List for England.

== History, architecture and fittings ==
The decision to form a new parish, the fifth to be created from the division of the ancient parish of St Pancras, was taken in 1848. Built between 1851 and 1852, construction was paid for by public subscription at a total cost of £8458 10s 6d. The new church was dedicated to St Mark upon consecration in 1853, with the parish taking its name from its proximity to Regent's Park.

The original church was built to the designs of architect Thomas Little. Constructed of Kentish Rag-stone in the Early English Gothic style, its most prominent feature is the tall tower and spire that rises from the south-west corner of the building.

Due to lack of funds, the north-facing chancel was only added to the nave in 1891 by the architect Arthur Blomfield. A reredos was commissioned from the young ecclesiastical architect Ninian Comper and installed of the high altar shortly after.

On the night of 21st September 1940, during the London Blitz, the church received a direct hit from an incendiary bomb dropped from enemy aircraft. The ensuing fire destroyed the roof and gutted the interior leading to the loss of all its fixtures and fittings. Five days later a second bomb destroyed the chancel.

A prefabricated chapel was erected on the south side of the churchyard in 1943 to serve as a temporary place of worship for the congregation. Following a long programme of reconstruction, led by the architect Arthur Bedford Knapp-Fisher, the church was reconsecrated in October 1957, 17 years after its wartime destruction.

In 1959 a replacement reredos made by the since-knighted Sir Ninian Comper was installed on the high altar, paid for by the St Luke's Hospital Trust. Between 1957 and 1961 Comper also provided four stained-glass windows for the west aisle each depicting scenes from the Life of Jesus.

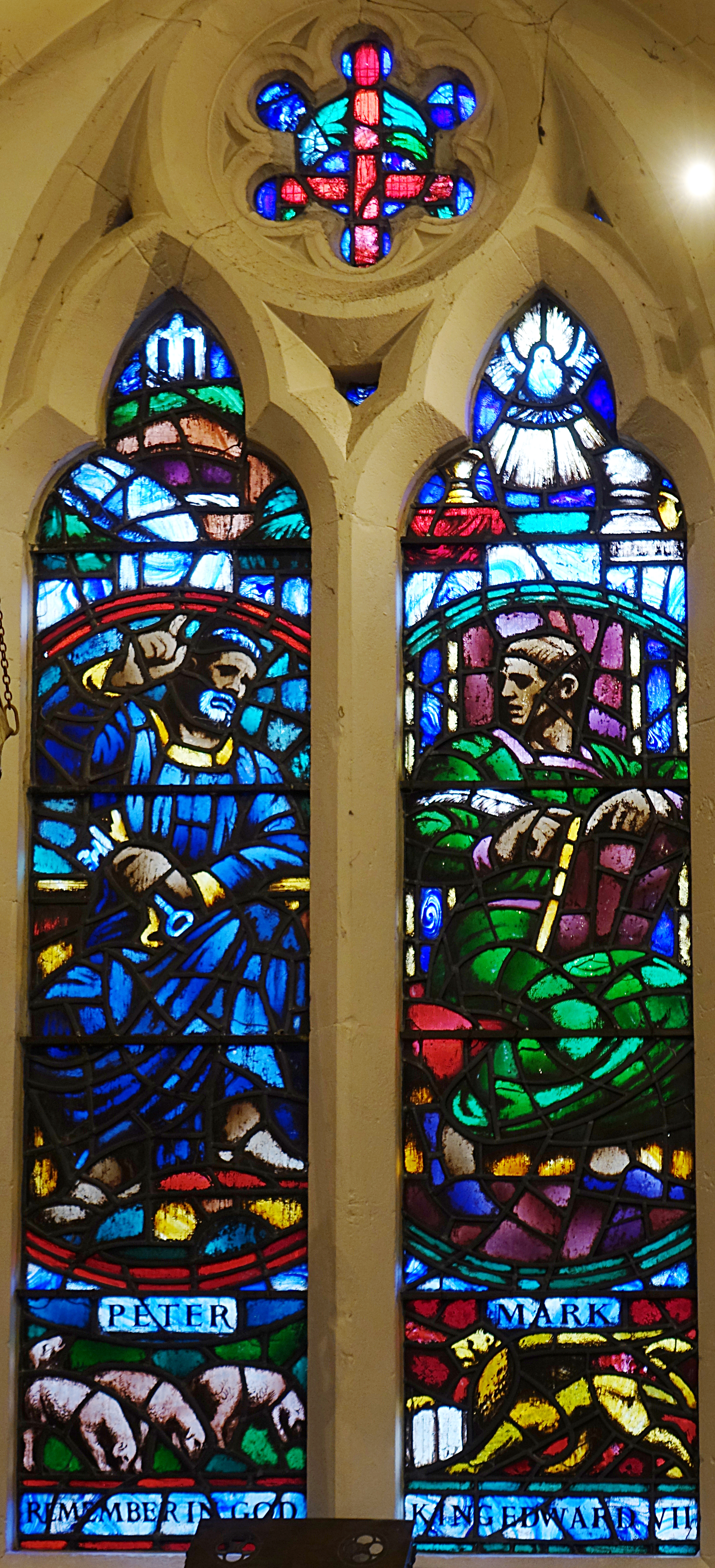
Stained glass by Brian Thomas

In addition to the Comper windows, the rebuilt church has acquired an extensive collection of post-war stained glass. In the north-facing chancel wall is a rose window glazed by the husband-and-wife partnership of Gounil & Philip Brown, installed in 1955 ahead of the church's reopening. The following year, the five lancets that fill the south wall were provided with abstract glass by the firm of Goddard & Gibbs. In the east aisle is a 1957 window by Brian Thomas depicting St Peter and St Mark, and two windows by John Hayward; a 1959 window depicting the Creation of the Animals and a 1966 window depicting scenes from the Life of St Mark. Directly above Hayward’s St Mark window is a small circular window depicting a dove by Graham Jones, installed in 2018.
