= Cloth Fair =

Street in the City of London

Coordinates: 51°31′7.92″N 0°05′58.77″W

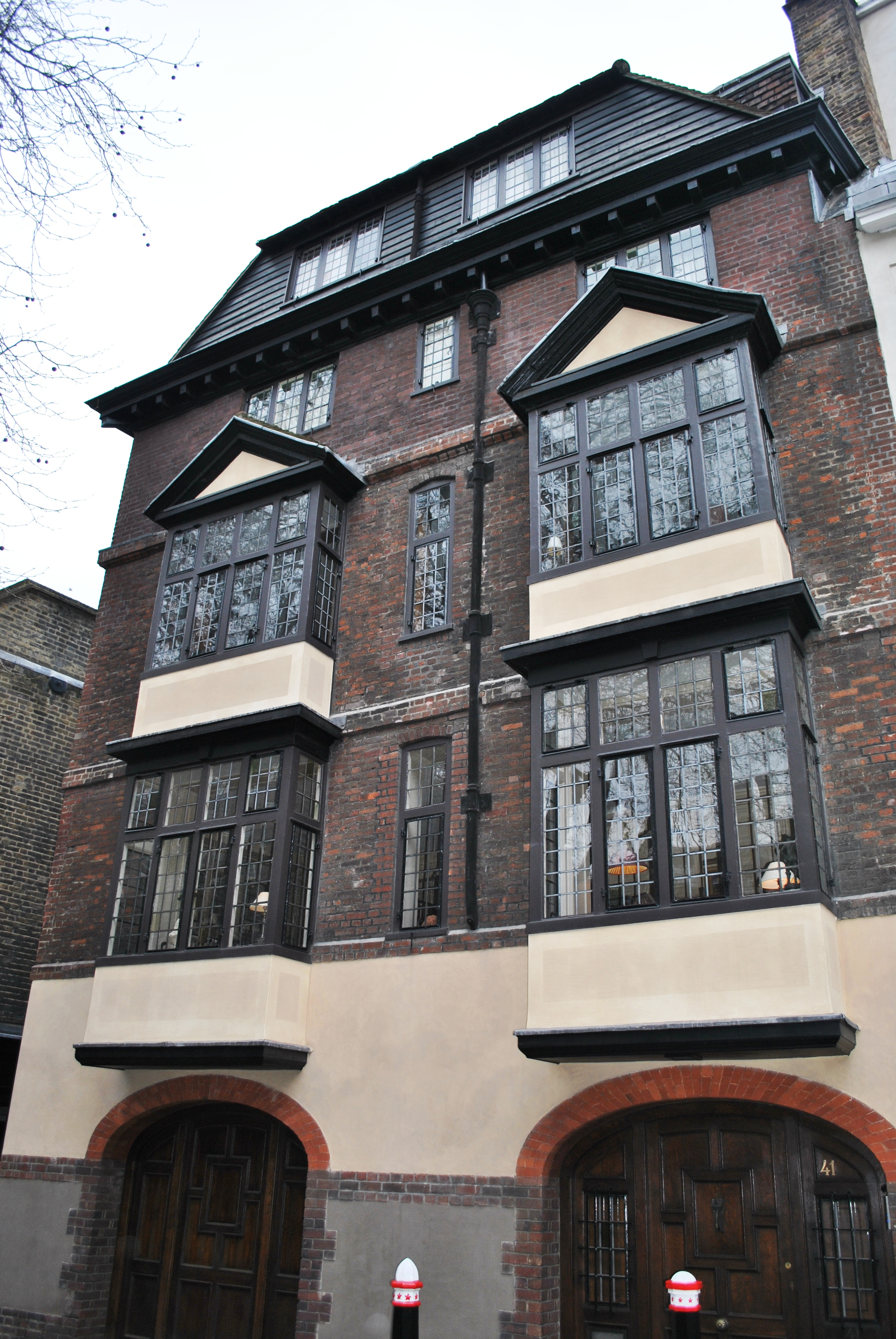
- The oldest residential dwelling in London (numbers 41 and 42)
- Interactive map of Cloth Fair
- Type: Residential street
- Length: 150 yards
- Postal code: EC1
- Nearest Tube station: Barbican
- Southwest end: Little Britain
- Northeast end: Middle Street

Other
- Known for: Medieval cloth market

Cloth Fair is a street in the City of London where, in medieval times, merchants gathered to buy and sell fabric during the Bartholomew Fair. Today, it is a short residential street to the east of Smithfield in the north-western part of the city and is located in the ward of Farringdon Within.

The street runs southwest to northeast from Little Britain, parallel to Long Lane to the north and bordered by the Anglican church of St. Bartholomew-the-Great to the south, until it merges with Middle Street some 150 yards later.

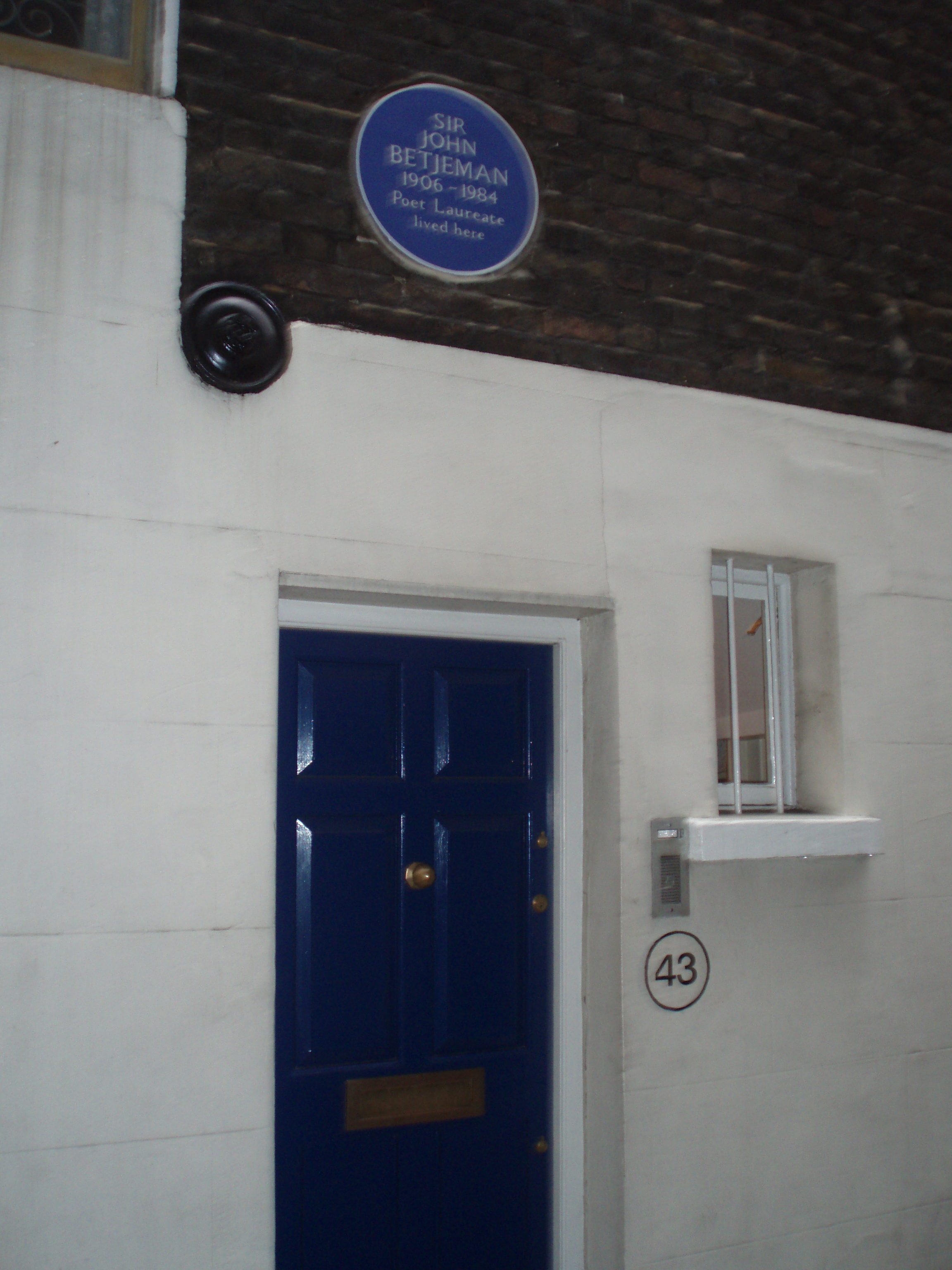
Blue plaque marking the entrance to John Betjeman's home in Cloth Court off Cloth Fair

The street was originally within the precincts of the Priory of St. Bartholomew's, and until 1910 formed a separate liberty, with gates that were shut at night. Such a small area could not meet the demands of installing street lighting and sewers, and rejoined the city. The area has a long history, a varied past and strong literary tradition.

It contains within its boundaries the oldest residential dwelling in London (numbers 41 and 42), and a pair of properties administered by the Landmark Trust. One of them (number 43) is the former home of English poet John Betjeman; its door is in Cloth Court off Cloth Fair. A restaurant on the ground floor on Cloth Fair for a time took his name.

The City Music Foundation is based in Church House in Cloth Fair.

The nearest London Underground station is Barbican (Circle, Hammersmith & City and Metropolitan lines) and the closest mainline railway station is Farringdon.

== See also ==
- List of demolished buildings and structures in London
