= St Michael and St George, White City =

- Parish Church of St Michael and St George, White City
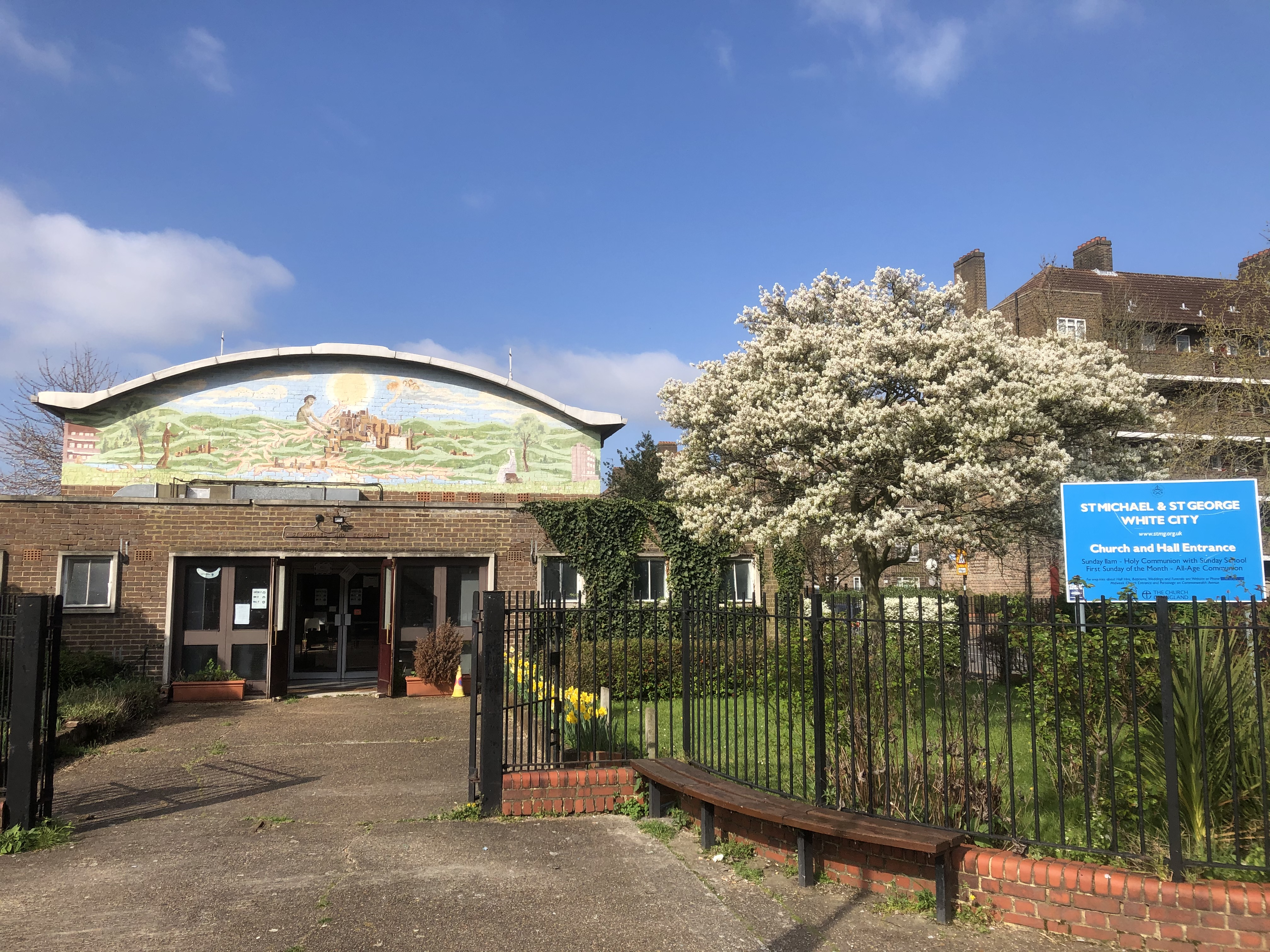
- St Michael and St George, White City as seen in Spring 2021

- 51°30′45″N 0°13′50″W
- Location: 1 Commonwealth Ave, Shepherd's Bush, London, W12 7QR
- Country: England
- Denomination: Church of England
- Tradition: Anglican
- Website: St Michael and St George, White City

History
- Founded: 1954
- Dedicated: 1953

Architecture
- Architect: John Seely and Paul Paget
- Style: Modernist
- Years built: 1952-53

Administration
- Province: Canterbury
- Diocese: Diocese of London
- Archdeaconry: Middlesex
- Deanery: Hammersmith and Fulham
- Parish: White City

Clergy
- Bishop: Bishop of Kensington

The church of St Michael and St George, White City, is the parish church of the White City estate in the W12 (Shepherd's Bush) district of west London. The church and parish serves the White City public-housing estate that was begun in the 1930s and completed after the Second World War. The parish boundary also encompasses new developments to the north of the former BBC Television Centre on the site of the former White City Stadium.

== Design and opening ==
The building was designed by the British architectural partnership of John Seely and Paul Paget and opened in 1954. It is described by Bridget Cherry and Nikolaus Pevsner in The Buildings of England London 3 North West, as:

"St Michael and St George, Commonwealth Avenue. 1952-3 by Seely & Paget, a humble, quietly modern L-shaped group of church and church hall, with shallow curved roofs. Exterior tympanum with naive painting. - (Wall paintimg above the altar by Brian Thomas)."

== Art ==
The large wall painting by Brian Thomas above the high altar depicts the parish's two patron saints with grazing sheep. As of 2019, it is no longer on display, obscured by a dossal curtain.

The painting in the tympanum is the result of a community arts project that was led by the artist Peter Pelz (c.1990).

The large painted murals on the walls on either side of the sanctuary are the result of a 1985 community arts project led by the artist Debbie de Beer. A plaque on the north side of the sanctuary reads as follows:

"This mural was painted in 1985 by local people under the direction of Debbie De Beer. It shows scenes from 'The Way of the Cross', an ecumenical Easter play in the streets of Shepherds Bush in 1984."

== Proposal to demolish ==
In November 2018 the Bishop of London made a formal proposal to demolish the current buildings and redevelop the site, "to include a new place of worship, improved community space and housing for Church ministry". These plans are currently in abeyance.

== Gallery ==
Images of the parish church of St Michael and St George, White City, London, UK.
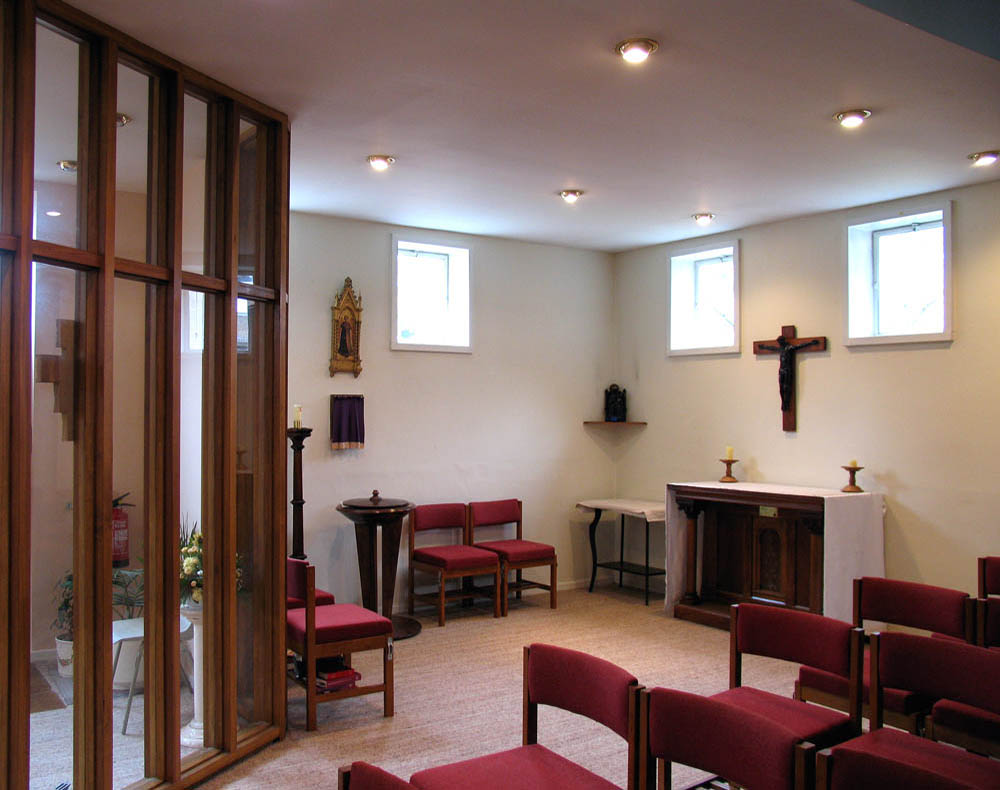
Side chapel in St Michael and St George's church, c.2004.

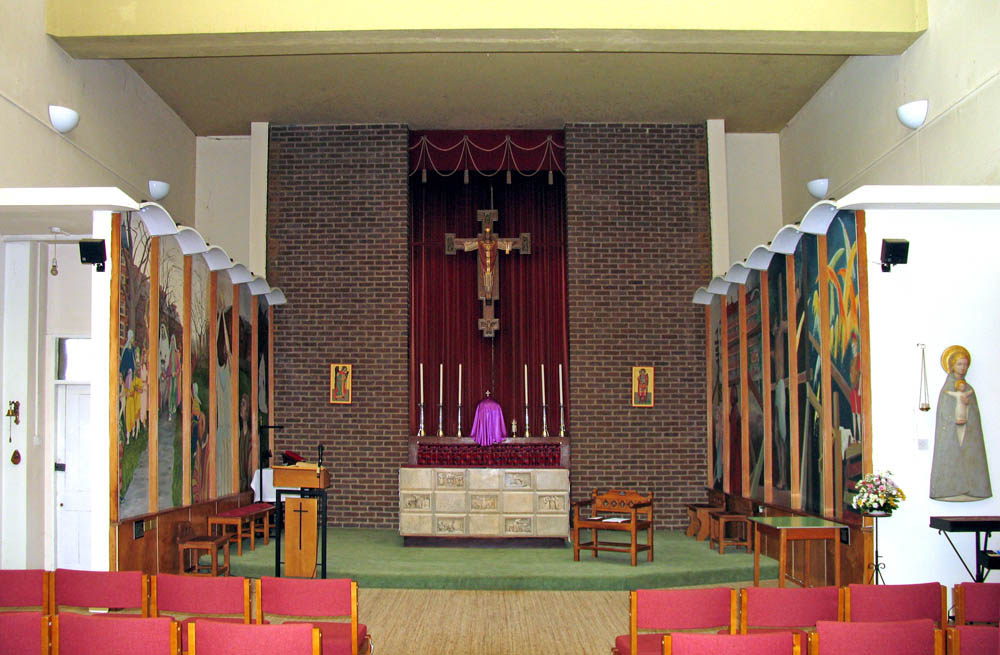
The sanctuary of St Michael and St George's church, c.2004.

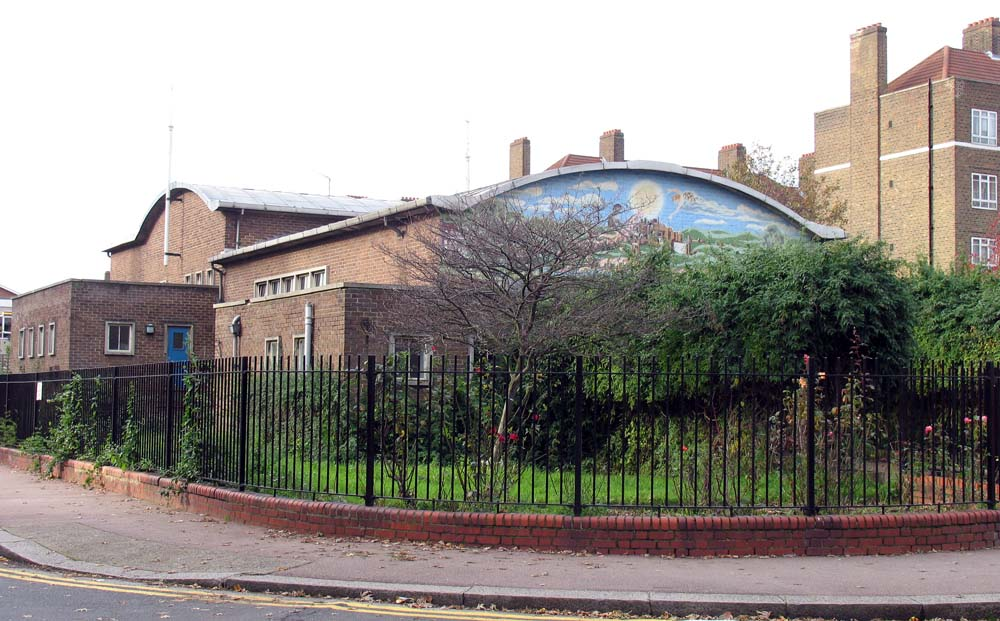
Exterior of St Michael and St George's church, looking south-west, c. 2004.

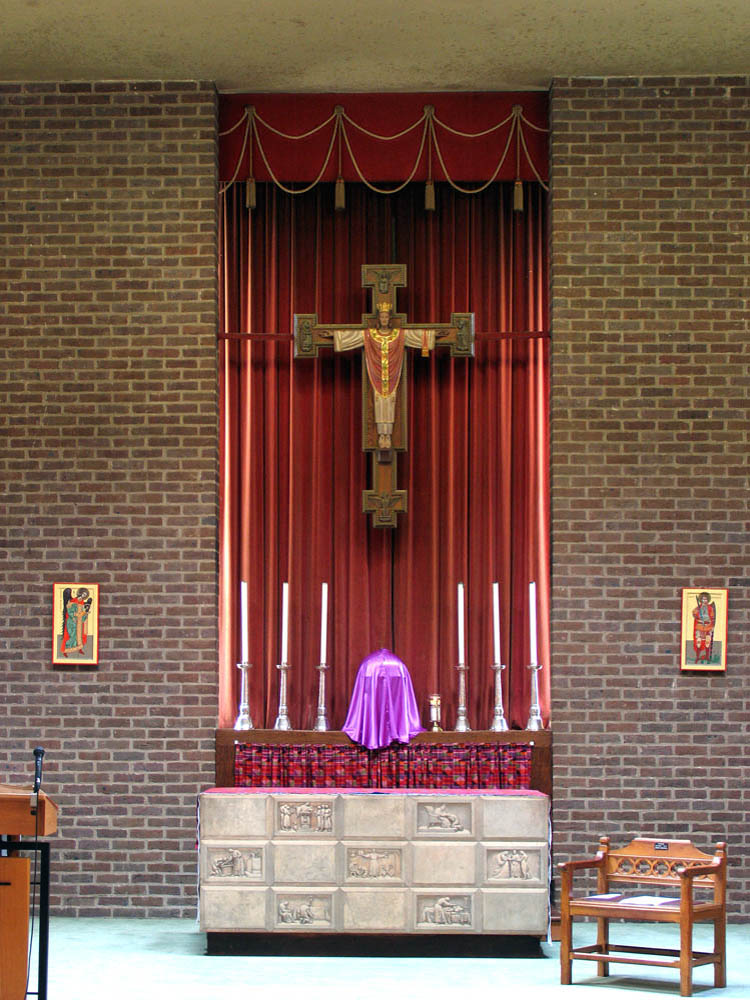
The high altar in St Michael and St George's church, c.2004.

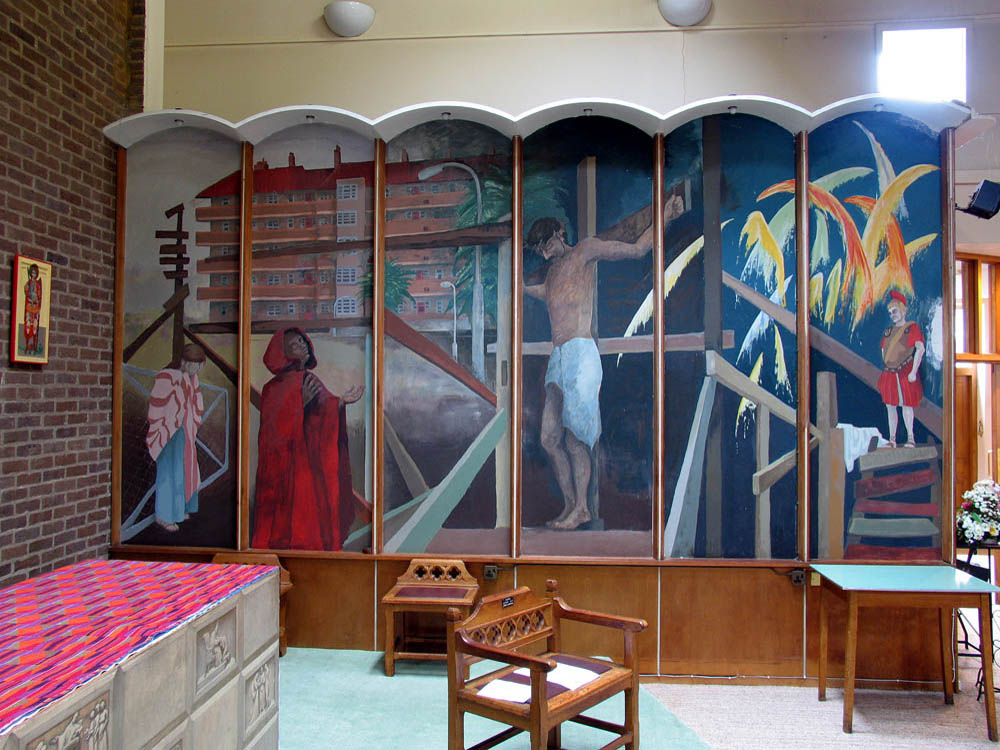
Sanctuary mural (south wall) "The Way of the Cross" (1985) by Debbie De Beer in St Michael and St George's church, c.2004.

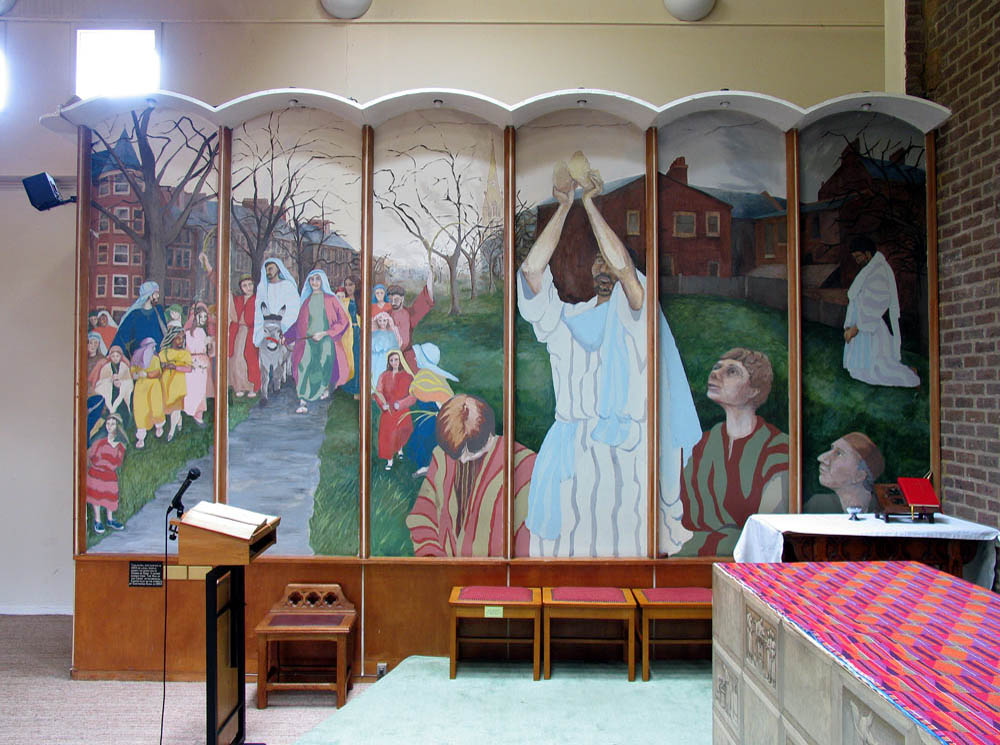
Sanctuary mural (north wall) "The Way of the Cross" (1985) by Debbie De Beer in St Michael and St George's church, c.2004.

== Further image sources ==
Royal Institute of British Architects Library: Photographs of the building (1953- ) by British Aluminium Co. and Bedford Lemere & Co.
