= Seely & Paget =

Twentieth-century English architectural partnership

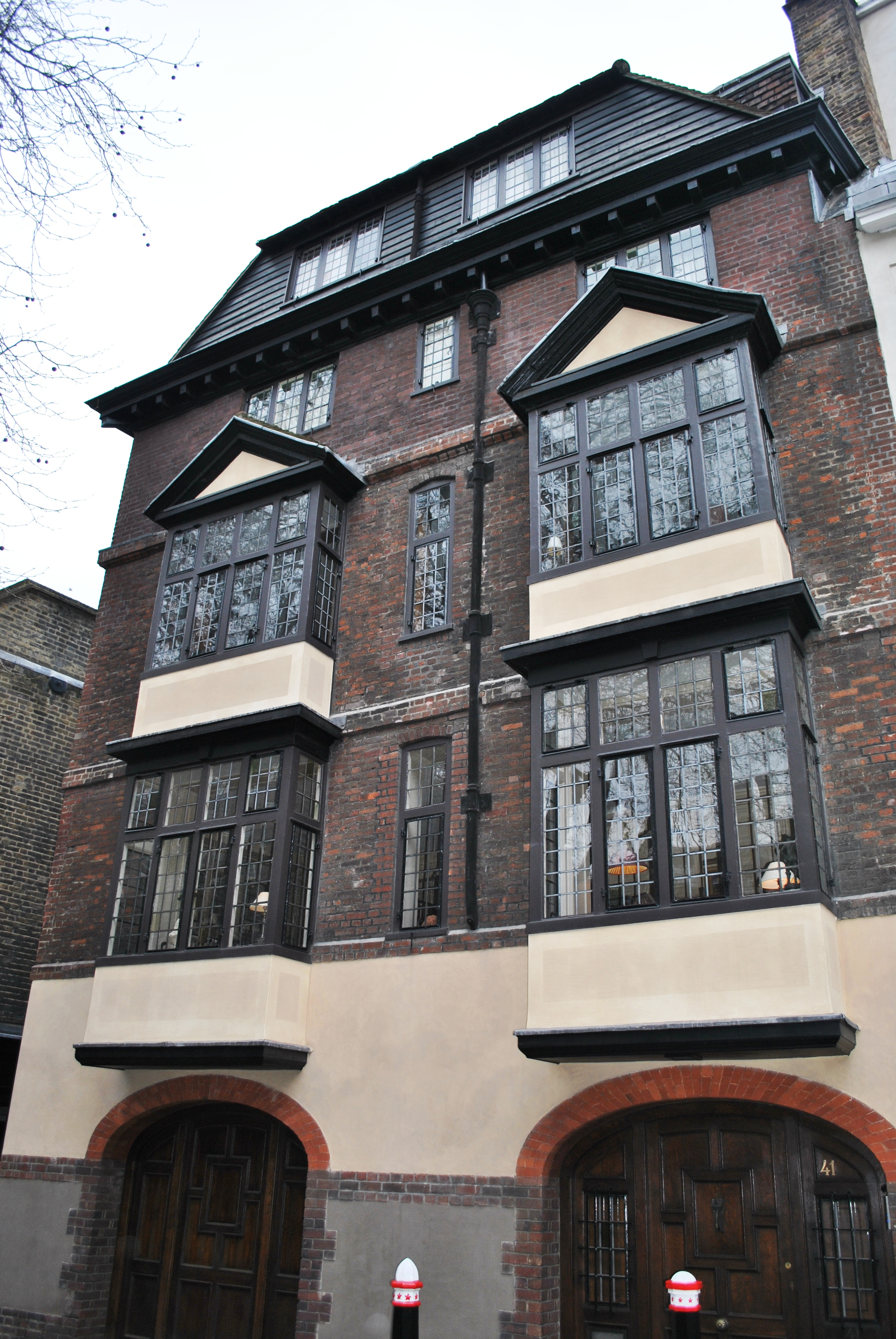
- 41–42 Cloth Fair, home and workplace of the partnership from 1930 onward

Practice information
- Firm type: Architecture firm
- Partners: John Seely, Paul Paget
- Founded: 1922
- Dissolved: 1963
- Location: London
- Coordinates: 51.5189°N 0.1000°W

Significant works and honors
- Buildings: Eltham Palace

Seely & Paget was the architectural partnership of John Seely, 2nd Baron Mottistone (1899–1963) and Paul Edward Paget (1901–1985).

Their work included the construction of Eltham Palace in the Art Deco style, and the post-World War II restoration of a number of bomb-damaged buildings, such as houses in the Little Cloister (Westminster Abbey), the London Charterhouse and the church of St John Clerkenwell.

== Early lives and meeting ==
John Seely, son of John Seely, 1st Baron Mottistone, and Paul Paget, son of Bishop Henry Luke Paget, met at Cambridge University, where Seely studied architecture, though Paget did not.

== Beginnings as architects ==
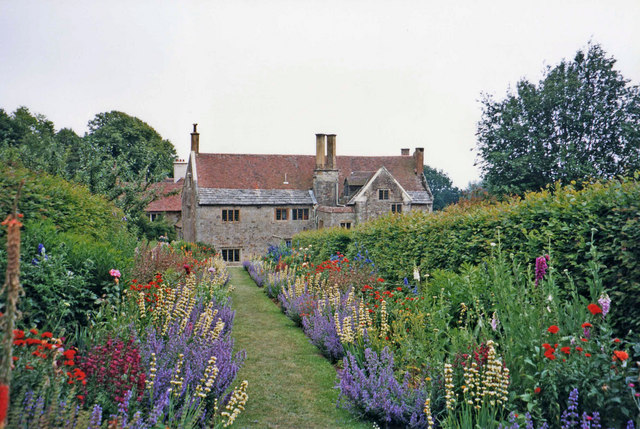
Mottistone Manor and Garden, Isle of Wight

After graduating, Paget worked for a while as a bank clerk in the City of London while Seely remained at Cambridge. When Seely came down from Cambridge, he insisted that Paget join him in architectural practice, even though Paget had no architectural training. In the partnership, Paget concentrated on working with clients on their requirements, while Seely carried out the design work.

The first work of the two together was to remodel Mottistone Manor, a historic property owned by Seely's father, and subsequently by the National Trust, in the village of Mottistone on the Isle of Wight. Seely's father insisted on their plans being approved by Sir Edwin Lutyens. In the garden they built "The Shack", a tiny cabin on wheels intended as their country retreat and drawing office.

== Seely & Paget ==
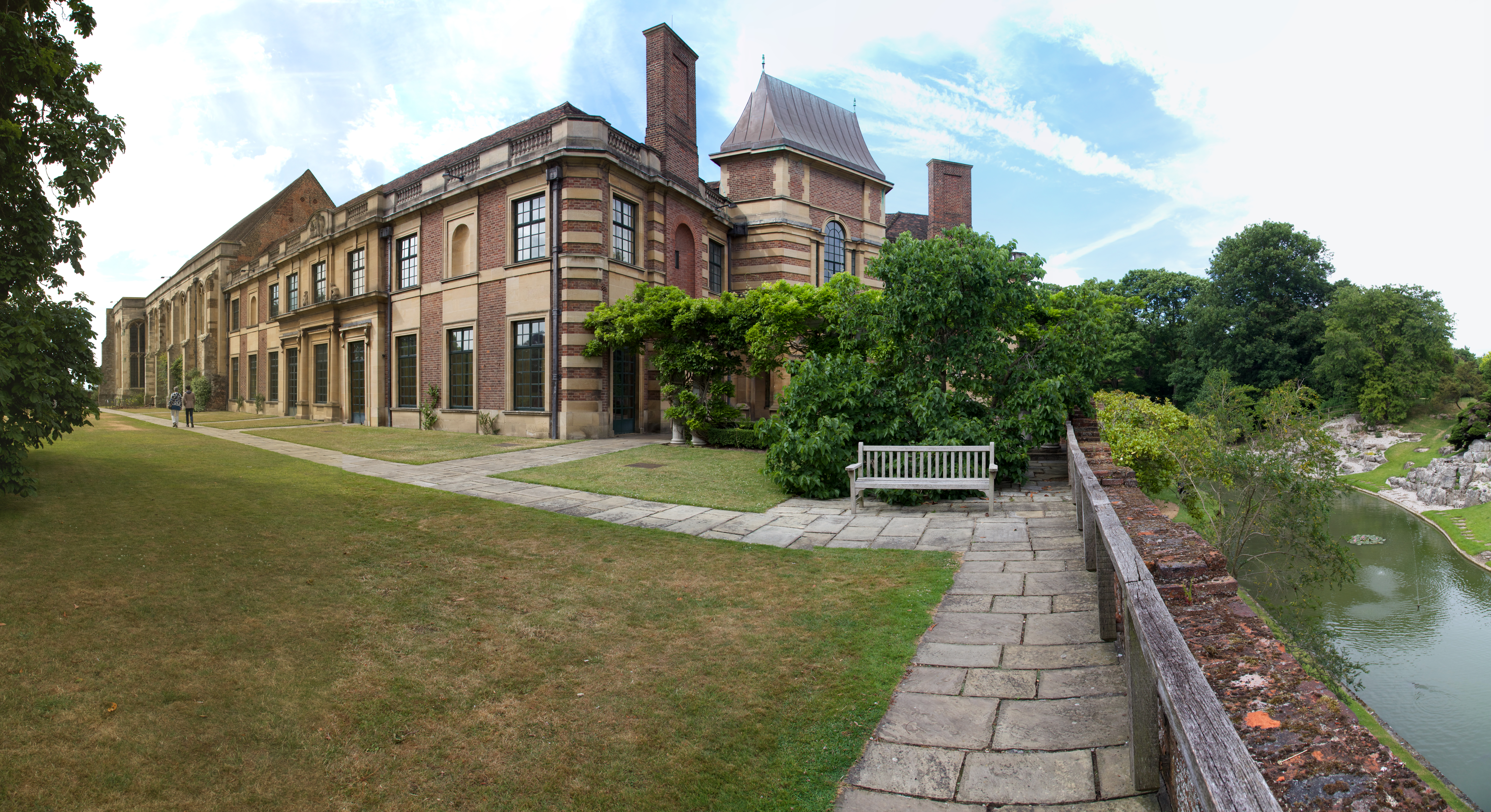
Eltham Palace exterior

In 1922, the two founded the architectural firm of Seely & Paget.

According to Paget, "it was just the marriage of two minds... we became virtually one person". They were inseparable in business and life, and referred to each other as "the partner". Friends and family also referred to them as "the partners".

From 1930 they lived and worked together at 41 Cloth Fair, London, where the firm remained until 1986. They had what Paget described as a "completely common life together", and installed twin bathtubs so they could bathe together.

=== Domestic works ===
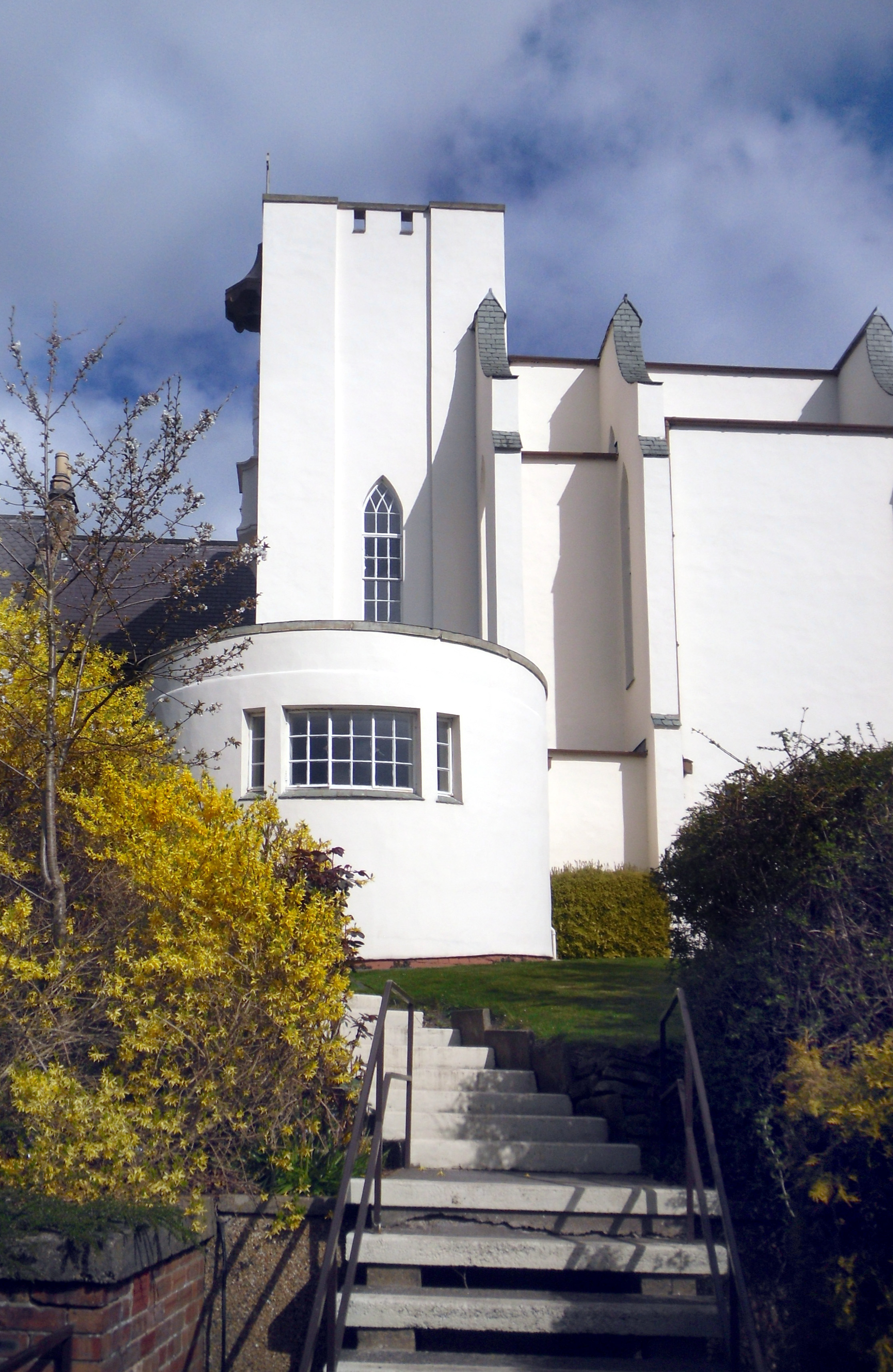
College chapel, College of the Venerable Bede (now the College of St Hild and St Bede), Durham

- 1931 (alterations): 1–2 The Grove, Highgate, north London
- 1931 (alterations): No. 3, The Grove, Highgate, north London
- 1936 (alterations): Eltham Palace
- 1951 (restored war damage): Eton College
- 1955 (restored war damage): Lambeth Palace: Great Hall, Library and Stable Block
- 1959 (restored war damage): London Charterhouse: Masters Court, Great Hall and Great Chamber
- 1959 (new): Westminster College, Oxford: new campus including Methodist chapel following the college's relocation from Horseferry Road, London SW1

=== Churches ===
- 1933 (new): St Faith Lee-on-the-Solent
- 1935 (new): St John's Church, Barrow-in-Furness
- 1939 (new): College chapel, College of the Venerable Bede, Durham
- 1939 (new): St John the Baptist (later St John & St James), Tottenham, north London

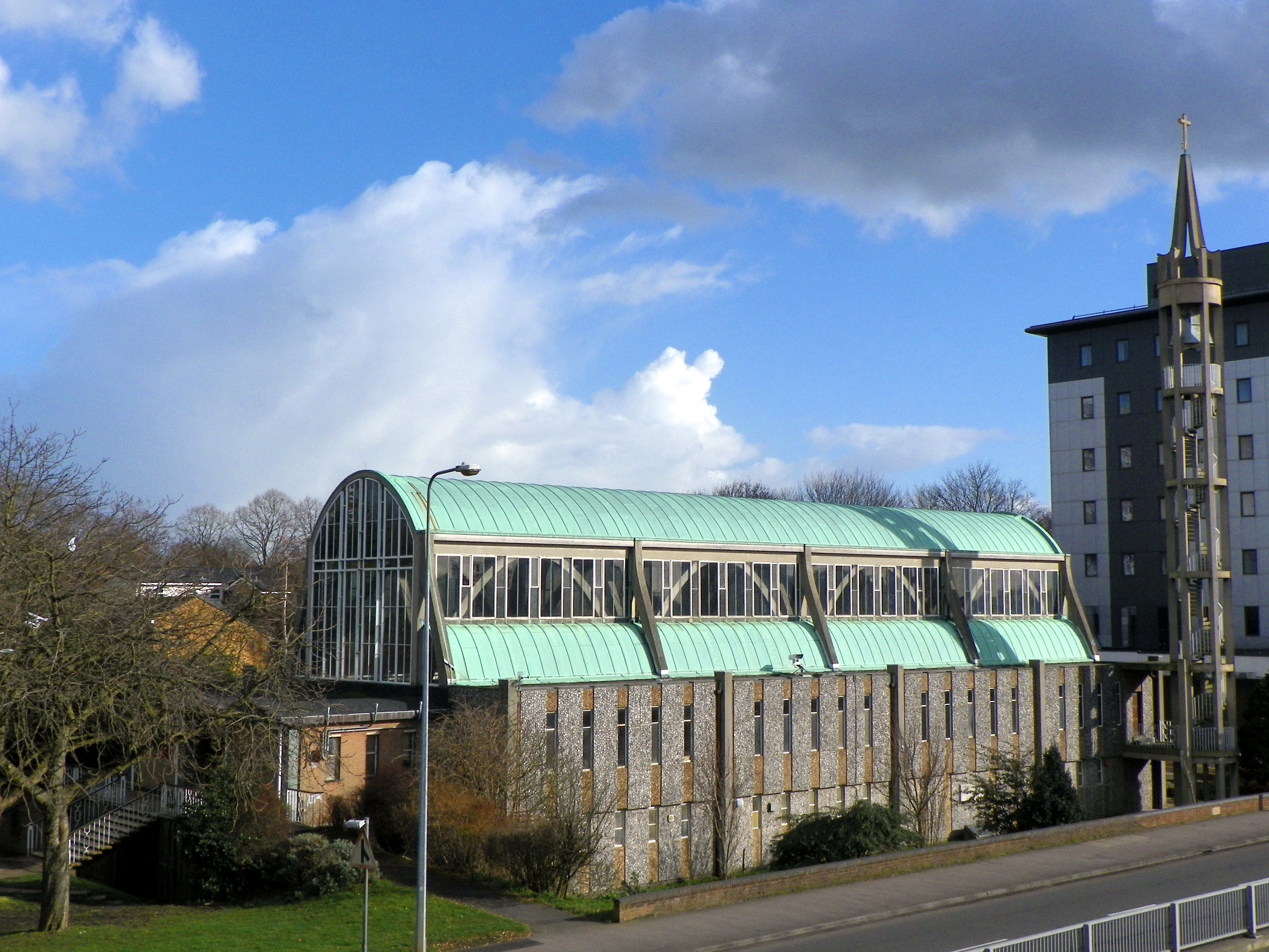
St Andrew and St George Stevenage

- 1952 (new): St Michael and St George, White City, London
- c.1952 (restored war damage): Fulham Palace, Tait Chapel
- 1955 (restored war damage): Lambeth Palace Chapel
- 1956 (restored war damage): St Mary Islington
- 1958 (restored war damage): St John Clerkenwell
- 1959 (addition): Chapel for the Order of the British Empire, St Paul's Cathedral, London
- 1960 (new): St Andrew and St George Stevenage
- 1960 (restored): All Saints Church at Cottesbrooke
- 1962 (new): Chapel for St John's School, Leatherhead

== End of the partnership ==
Seely died on 18 January 1963 and was buried in St Catherine's chapel garden at Westminster Abbey.

Paget succeeded Seely as Surveyor of the Fabric of St Paul's Cathedral, in which role he supervised the cleaning of the cathedral and the reconstruction of the tower of St Augustine Watling Street. However, he completed little further architectural work, and in 1971, aged 70, he married children's writer Verily Anderson and retired with her and her children to Templewood in Norfolk (a house originally designed by the partners for Paget's uncle), where he lived until his death in 1985.
