= City Music Foundation =

The City Music Foundation (CMF) is an organization that supports professional musicians in the United Kingdom in developing their careers.

Musicians can apply for support. It was Rhinegold Charity of the Year in 2018. The organization supports classical, folk, and jazz musicians.

The Trustees are Kate Gee (Royal College of Music), Alastair King, Sir Roger Gifford, and Sir Andrew Parmley. CMF artists include Anna Cavaliero (soprano), Echéa Quartet (string quartet), Iona Fyfe (folksinger), Ariana Kashefi (cello), Mingyuan Ruan (accordion), Iyad Sughayer (piano), Giacomo Susani (guitar), and Rosalind Ventris (viola). CMF is based at Church House, Cloth Fair, London, and is a Registered Charity.
