= St Mary's Church, Islington =

Coordinates: 51°32′18.26″N 0°6′7.41″W

- The Parish Church of St Mary, Islington
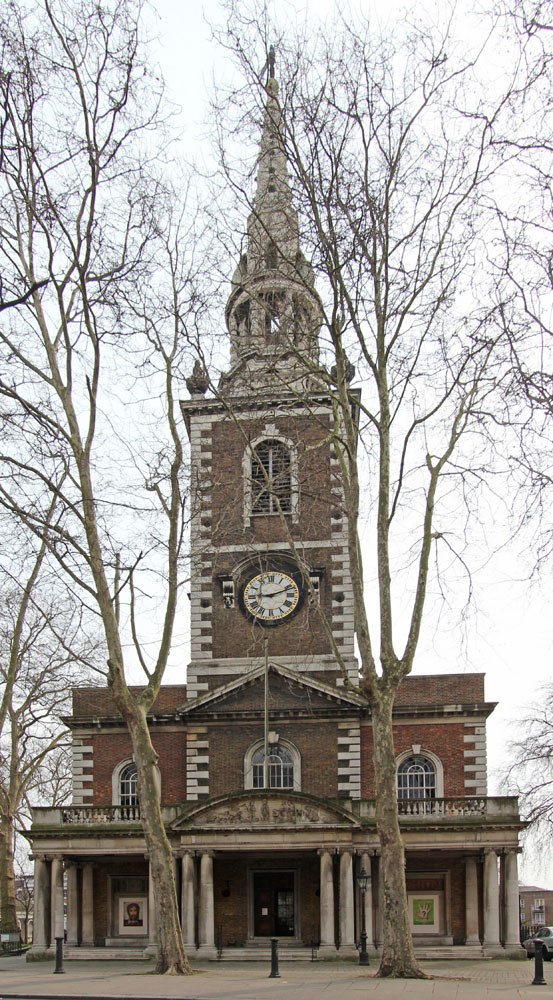
- St Mary's Church viewed from Upper Street
- St Mary's Church, Islington
- OS grid reference: TQ 31744 83875
- Location: Upper Street, Islington, London
- Country: England
- Denomination: Church of England
- Churchmanship: Open Evangelical
- Website: stmaryislington.org

History
- Founded: 12th Century (estimate)
- Dedication: Mary the Virgin

Architecture
- Functional status: Active
- Heritage designation: Grade II listed
- Architect(s): Lancelot Dowbiggin, Reginald Blomfield, Seely & Paget

Administration
- Province: Canterbury
- Diocese: London
- Archdeaconry: Hackney
- Deanery: Islington
- Parish: Islington, St Mary

Clergy
- Vicar: The Revd James Hughesdon

The Church of St Mary the Virgin is the parish church of Islington, in the Church of England Diocese of London. The present parish is a compact area centered on Upper Street between Angel and Highbury Corner, bounded to the west by Liverpool Road, and to the east by Essex Road/Canonbury Road. The church is a Grade II listed building.

The churchyard was enlarged in 1793. With the rapid growth of Islington, it became full and closed for burials in 1853. It was laid out as a public garden of one and a half acres in 1885.

== History ==
=== Pre-Reformation ===
The first recorded church building was erected in the twelfth century and was replaced in the fifteenth century.

John Farley is mentioned as vicar of "Iseldon", Middlesex, in 1446.

Before his consecration as Bishop of St David's in 1509, Edward Vaughan served as vicar. Robert Browne, who authored the founding principles of Congregationalism, served as lecturer at St Mary's until around 1578.

=== 17th century ===
John Webster the Jacobean dramatist, married his heavily pregnant 17-year-old second wife, Sara Peniall, at St Mary's in Lent 1606, by special licence. William Cave became vicar in 1662, at the age of twenty-five, and held the office until 1689. He was subsequently buried at the church, having died in Isleworth in 1713.

=== 18th century ===
On 24 July 1738, the Vicar of St Mary's, George Stonehouse, invited Charles Wesley to "take charge of his parish, under him, as his Curate." He did not, however, possess any licence to do so from the Bishop of London. Wesley's journal lists many occasions on which he preached, and his regular praying at the church.

Wesley's preaching proved unpopular for some and within a year he and George Whitefield were expelled from the pulpit at St Mary's. On 27 April 1739 he noted, "At Islington vestry the Churchwardens forbad my preaching: demanded my local licence. I said nothing but that "I heard them." Scions was very abusive; bidding me shake off the dust of my feet, &c.; and said, "You have all the spirit of the devil," mentioning Mr. Whitefield, Stonehouse, and me by name." From this point on Wesley joined his brother John and George Whitefield in field-preaching. Following a series of meetings with the Bishop of London, he decided to leave the city and to join his brother in Bristol during August 1739.

The church fell into "very ruinous condition" and the Islington Church Act 1750 was passed to enable it to be rebuilt. The new building was consecrated on 26 May 1754, designed by Lancelot Dowbiggin.

In this period, the church leadership began to establish ties to African leaders. In 1759, Philip Quaque, son of the Fante king Birempong Cudjo, was baptised at St Mary's, after having attended the church with his brother for four years. He became the first black African to be ordained as a priest in the Church of England and returned to Ghana to minister as a missionary.

Richard Smith, a West India merchant, purchased the advowson (the right to appoint clergy) for St Mary in 1771. His eldest son, also Richard Smith(1739–1772), became Rector of Islington.

=== 19th century ===
The Revd Daniel Wilson (1778–1858), served as vicar from 1824 until 1832, when he became Bishop of Calcutta. In 1831 he was one of the founders of the Lord's Day Observance Society. The Islington Clerical Conference, founded by Daniel Wilson, ran from 1827 to 1983 and was held at St Mary's. It was an important annual meeting point for Evangelicals. Wilson's son, also Daniel, served as vicar of the church for fifty-four years, during which time many new parishes were created as the population of Islington soared.

The young Samuel Ajayi Crowther was sent to Islington from Sierra Leone in 1826 to study for a year at the church's school and attend services. In the 1840s, following his second visit to London, he was ordained as a minister by the Bishop of London. He served all his life in West Africa, in 1864 being consecrated as the first African Bishop in Nigeria. He also became a noted linguist, publishing a Yoruban grammar and a translation of the Book of Common Prayer in Yoruba. He returned to Islington several times and ordained his own son, Dandeson Crowther, in St Mary's Church in 1870.

William Hagger Barlow became vicar on the death of Daniel Wilson the younger. He built the Bishop Wilson Memorial Hall (subsequently renovated for use as St Mary's Neighbourhood Centre) and the vicarage, which is still in use.

=== 20th century ===
An extensive portico of Portland stone was built at the west door in 1904, to a design of Sir Reginald Blomfield. It includes a relief of the Nativity.

Donald Coggan, later Archbishop of Canterbury, served as curate from 1934 to 1937.

On the third night of the London Blitz, at 10.20pm on 9 September 1940, a bomb destroyed the majority of the church, leaving only the tower and spire intact.

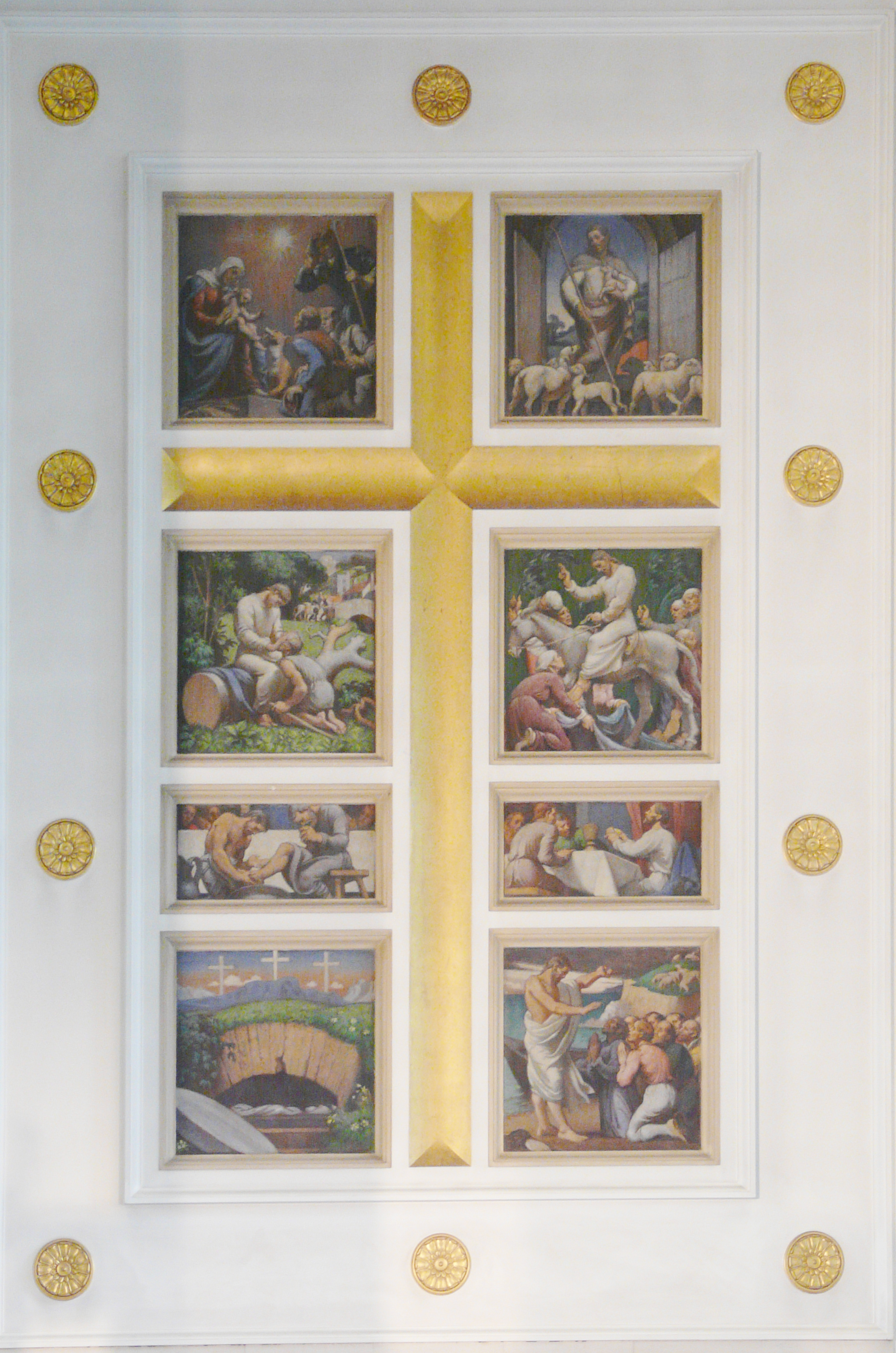
Main-altar reredos mural by Brian Thomas

The church was rebuilt following an appeal by the incumbent, The Revd Hugh Gough, and dedicated in 1956 when Maurice Wood was vicar. The partnership of John Seely and Paul Paget produced an ambitious design that attempted to create a space suitable for a "renaissance of evangelical worship". The main worship space is vast, with a volume of over 5000 cubic metres, and features deep clear windows that allow an unusually high amount of more natural light. The east and west ends have murals by Brian Thomas. The original church's lectern, baptismal font and Royal Arms all survived the bombing. They are visible within the church.

David Sheppard, later Bishop of Liverpool, played cricket for England while an assistant curate at Islington, 1955–7. In 1962, George Carey later Archbishop of Canterbury, became curate and, among other innovations, made connections with local council departments and founded a new Boys' Club.

In 1967 St Mary's under Rev Johnson saw the beginning of the first church for British Asians. The founders were the brothers Chowdhry (Majeed, Najeeb and Waheeb) and their friend Emmanuel Din. Revd Daniel Gill became the first Pakistani minister to lead an Urdu service in the UK, although he was not an ordained minister in the Church of England. This British Pakistani church inspired the growth of similar 'Urdu Fellowships' across London and eventually the UK. As many Pakistani Christians have moved to less expensive areas of London, the Urdu fellowship ended in the 1990s.

St Mary's role in British Evangelicalism waned, as the Islington Clerical Conference (of which the vicar had been ex-officio president) ended in 1983.

=== 21st century ===
In 2003, vicar Graham Kings and others founded Fulcrum, a think-tank to renew the evangelical tradition at the centre of the Church of England.

From the 1990s, as Islington became a more fashionable place to live and Upper Street developed a significant nightlife, St Mary's retained a concern to serve the widening range of people in the locality. The crypt beneath the church was radically transformed with an innovative regeneration programme.

== Worship ==
Worship services take place at St Mary's most days of the week. On Sundays, the main act of worship is the 11am service. The Book of Common Prayer is used for a service of Holy Communion at 9am once per month.

A daily morning prayer meeting takes place at 9.30am on weekdays.
