= Lancelot Dowbiggin =

English architect

Lancelot Dowbiggin (born in 1685 in Melling, near Lancaster in Lancashire, England - died 24 July 1759 in London, England) was an English architect.

He designed St Mary's Church in Islington, London, Fortiscue Lodge in Enfield, and several houses in Gentleman's Row. He is also responsible for finishing, in 1747, St. Mary's Church in Rotherhithe, also in London.

He was buried in St. Mary's Church, Islington.
