= National Music Conservatory =

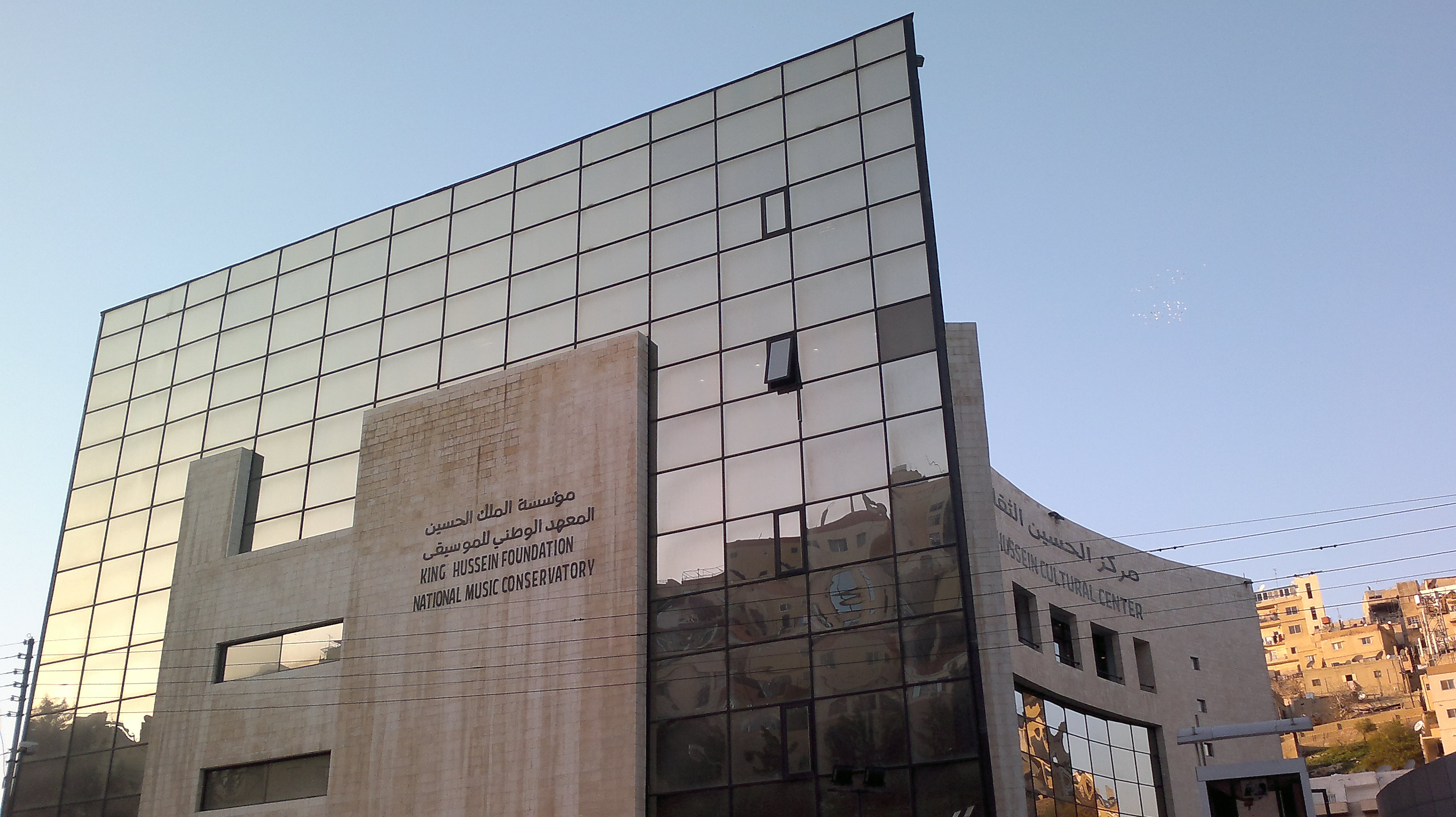
The National Music Conservatory in Amman

The National Music Conservatory (NMC) is a music school in Amman, Jordan.

NMC was established by the Noor Al Hussein Foundation in 1986. It is an institution for the development of musicians and the promotion of music appreciation in Jordan.

== See also ==
- JOrchestra (formerly the Amman Symphony Orchestra)
