= JOrchestra =

The JOrchestra, or Jordanian National Orchestra Association, is a symphony orchestra based in Amman, Jordan.

The orchestra was founded as the Amman Symphony Orchestra (ASO) in 1988, which was the third symphony orchestra to be founded in the Middle East. It was then rebranded as JOrchestra in 2014 by Talal Abu-Ghazaleh to revive it after being inactive for a number of years.

== See also ==
- Cairo Symphony Orchestra, Egypt
- National Music Conservatory, Amman, Jordan
