= 41–42 Cloth Fair =

Listed building in London, England

41-42 Cloth Fair
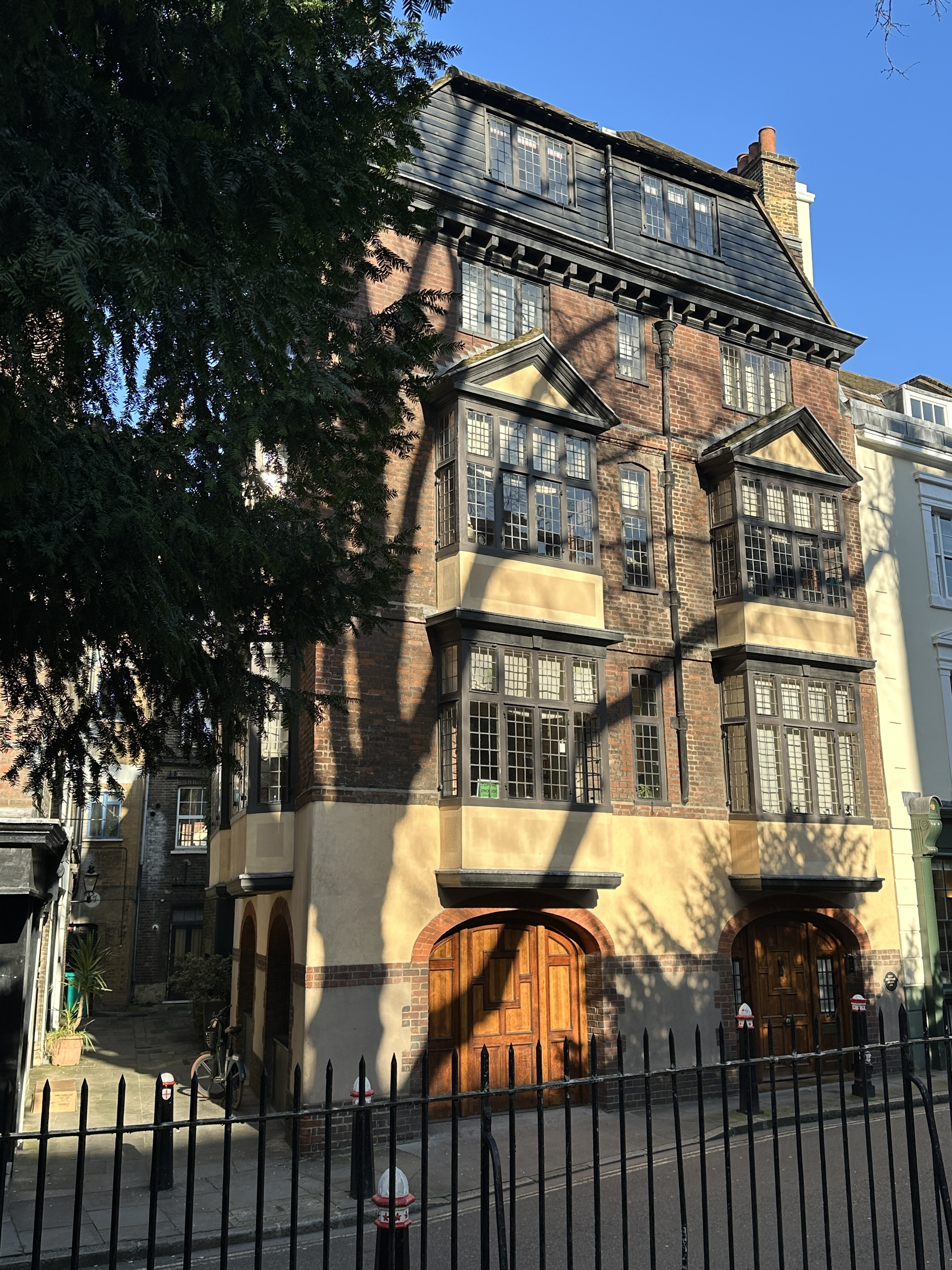
- Interactive map of the 41-42 Cloth Fair area

General information
- Type: Residential
- Location: London, England
- Coordinates: 51°31′08″N 0°06′00″W
- Completed: c. 1614

Listed Building – Grade II*
- Official name: Nos. 41 and 42, CLOTH FAIR
- Designated: 04 January 1950
- Reference no.: 1064703

41–42 Cloth Fair is a Grade II* listed pair of houses in London that are considered to be the only survivors of the Great Fire of London within The City of London, and therefore the oldest residence within it.

The building is located opposite St Bartholomew-the-Great which is itself considered to be the oldest parish church in London, and sits next to 43 Cloth Fair which was home of John Betjeman, a poet famous for his heritage campaigns. Its use of brick is considered to be an early example within England.

Other than the Great Fire of London, the houses have also survived attempted slum clearances. In 1930, restoration work on the building was carried out by Seely and Paget with careful attention given to the architectural history of the building, intending to maintain the original elements of the existing structure.
