= Simon Gunton =

Simon Gunton (1609-1676) was an English clergyman and antiquary.

== Life ==
Simon Gunton was the son of William Gunton of Peterborough, Northamptonshire, by Ellen his wife, and was baptised in St. John's Church in that town, 30 December 1609. His father was registrar of the diocese, having been elected 13 March 1616. Simon was educated at Magdalene College, Cambridge, as a member of which he graduated B.A. in 1630–1, proceeding M.A. in 1634. Then taking orders he became vicar of Pytchley, Northamptonshire, 14 October 1637, and on 12 November 1646 was collated, but without effect, to the first prebend of Peterborough. During the civil war he found a retreat in the household of James Stuart, Duke of Richmond and Lennox, as we learn from the dedication to the little duke Esme of his 'God's House, with the nature and use thereof, as it ought to be understood and respected by Christians under the Gospel,' 8vo, London, 1657.

After the Restoration in 1660 he took possession of his prebend, and on 24 September of the same year was presented to the vicarage of Peterborough. He soon afterwards obtained an act in augmentation of the living. The following year he published another little manual entitled Όρθολατρεία: or, a brief Discourse concerning Bodily Worship: proving it to be God's due, 8vo, London, 1661. In December 1666 he resigned the vicarage of Peterborough to become rector of Fiskerton, Lincolnshire, where he died and was buried 17 May 1676. By his wife, Susannah Dickenson, of Peterborough, he had several children. During his boyhood, as he himself states in a letter to Joseph Henshaw, bishop of the diocese, Gunton took copies of the inscriptions on the monuments in Peterborough Cathedral, many of which were defaced by the parliamentary troops. He had also through his father's position unlimited access to the cathedral archives before they were in turn destroyed. Ten years after his death his collections, revised and augmented with an appendix of charters and privileges and a supplement by Simon Patrick were published as The History of the Church of Peterburgh: wherein the most remarkable Things concerning that Place, from the first Foundation thereof: With other Passages of History, not unworthy publick view are represented. . . . Illustrated with Sculptures, fol., London, 1686. White Kennett, afterwards bishop of Peterborough, wrote large additions in a copy now preserved in the cathedral library. Thomas Baker's copy with Kennett's notes and a few of his own is in Cambridge University Library. There are also copies with notes by Bishop Cumberland, William Cole, and others, in the Bodleian Library. The original manuscript of Patrick's Supplement was acquired by the British Museum in 1859. An Epitome of Gunton's History by C. Jacob, published at Peterborough in 1804, 8vo, went through several editions.
