= Brockless =

Brockless is a surname. Notable people with the surname include:

- Brian Brockless (1926–1995), British composer, organist, and conductor
- Pauline Brockless (1929–2015), British soprano
- Tommy Brockless, fictional character on Torchwood
