= St Bartholomew-the-Less =

Coordinates: 51°31′4.52″N 0°6′2.36″W

St Bartholomew the Less
- Church of Saint Bartholomew the Less
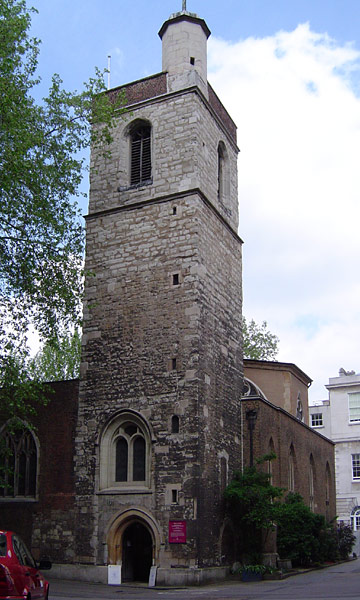
- Church of St Bartholomew the Less

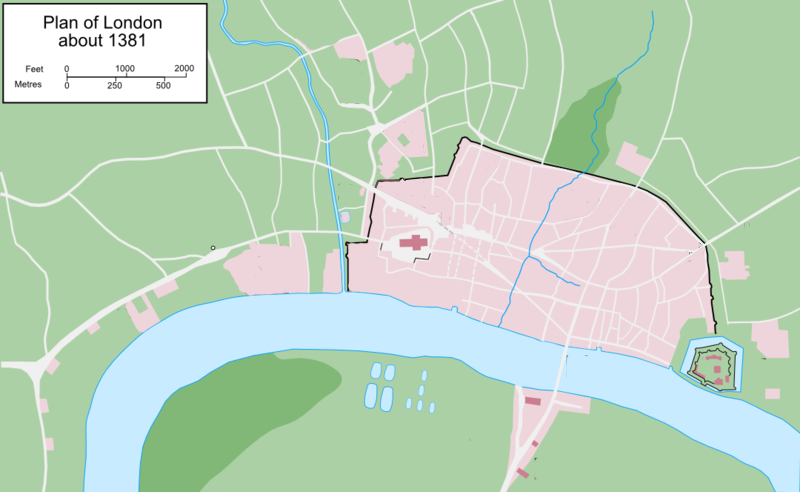
- Location: City of London
- Country: England
- Denomination: Church of England
- Previous denomination: Roman Catholic (until 1534)
- Tradition: Anglo-Catholic
- Religious order: Canons Regular of Saint Augustine (until 1534)
- Website: stbartstheless.org.uk

History
- Founded: 1123
- Founder: Rahere
- Dedication: Bartholomew the Apostle

Architecture
- Heritage designation: Grade II*
- Style: English Gothic, Gothic Revival

Administration
- Diocese: London
- Parish: St Bartholomew the Great

Clergy
- Rector: Marcus Walker

St Bartholomew the Less is an Anglican church in the City of London, associated with St Bartholomew's Hospital, within whose precincts it stands. Once a parish church, it has, since 1 June 2015, been a chapel of ease in the parish of St Bartholomew the Great.

== History ==
The present establishment is the latest in a series of churches and chapels associated with the hospital over the past 800 years. Its earliest predecessor, known as the Chapel of the Holy Cross, was founded nearby in 1123 (at the same time as the priory, now the Priory Church of St Bartholomew the Great) before moving to the present site in 1184.

Along with most other religious foundations the hospital was dissolved by Henry VIII. It was then refounded by King Henry VIII, when the chapel became an Anglican parish church serving those living within its precincts. Its suffix, "the less", was given to distinguish it from its larger neighbour, St Bartholomew the Great (the former priory); both churches commemorate the same saint, Bartholomew the Apostle.

The church's tower and west façade date from the 15th century, with two of its three bells dating from 1380 and 1420. They hang within an original medieval bell frame, believed to be the oldest in the City of London. In 1793, George Dance the Younger, a Royal Academician, created a new octagonal interior within the shell of the medieval chapel, its clerestorey rising above the old walls. The new construction was made entirely of wood and soon became affected by dry-rot. In 1823 it was replaced under the supervision of Thomas Hardwick, who replicated the timber construction in stone with an iron ceiling. He also made alterations to the detailing.

The church suffered some bomb damage during the Blitz of the Second World War but this was repaired and the church reopened by 1951.

St Bartholomew the Less Church's interior although small is light and airy, largely due to George Dance's use of high lunette windows. Its form is that of an octagonal Gothic vault fitted into a square by the means of adding open triangular chapels at its corners.

The church was designated a Grade II* listed building on 4 January 1950 and is associated with the Haberdashers' Company, its close neighbour in West Smithfield at Haberdashers' Hall, EC1.

After a few years in which the Rector of the nearby St Bartholomew the Great was simultaneously Priest-in-Charge of St Bartholomew the Less, with the church retaining its own PCC and Churchwardens, on 1 June 2015, the parishes of both churches were dissolved and replaced with the united benefice of Great St Bartholomew. The Rector of the former parish of St Bartholomew the Great became Rector of the united benefice. The boundary of the new parish incorporates precisely both former parishes. There is now a single PCC and Churchwardens responsible for both buildings. The parish church is St Bartholomew the Great, while St Bartholomew the Less is a Chapel of Ease within the parish. Services continue to be held at the church, especially a 12:30 Anglican Eucharist on Tuesdays, a 12:30 Roman Catholic Mass at 12:30 on Thursdays, and a 10:00 Anglican Family Eucharist on most Sundays of the year.

== Notable people associated with the church ==
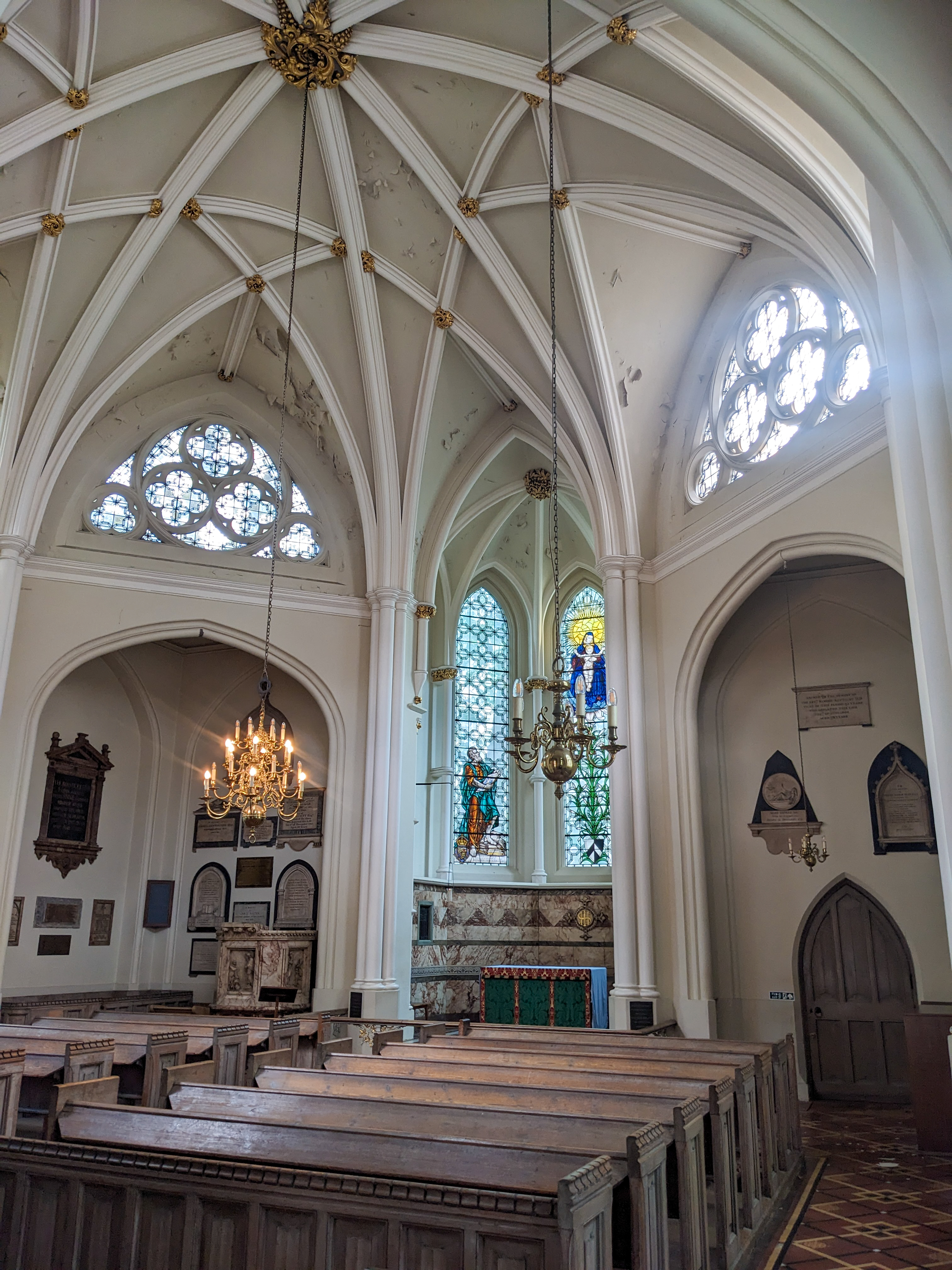
Interior of St Bartholomew the Less

- Thomas Bodley, founder of Bodleian Library: buried 1613
- Thomas D'Oylie, physician and linguist: buried 1603
- Inigo Jones, architect: baptised 1573
- Abbots of Shrewsbury, Richard Lye, Abbot of Shrewsbury: buried 1512
- John Lyly, author and playwright: buried November, 1606
- Thomas Monro, Vicar and Hospitaller of St Bartholomew the Less, 1754–65
- Thomas Watson, poet: buried 1592

== See also ==
- List of churches and cathedrals of London
