= Gatehouse School =

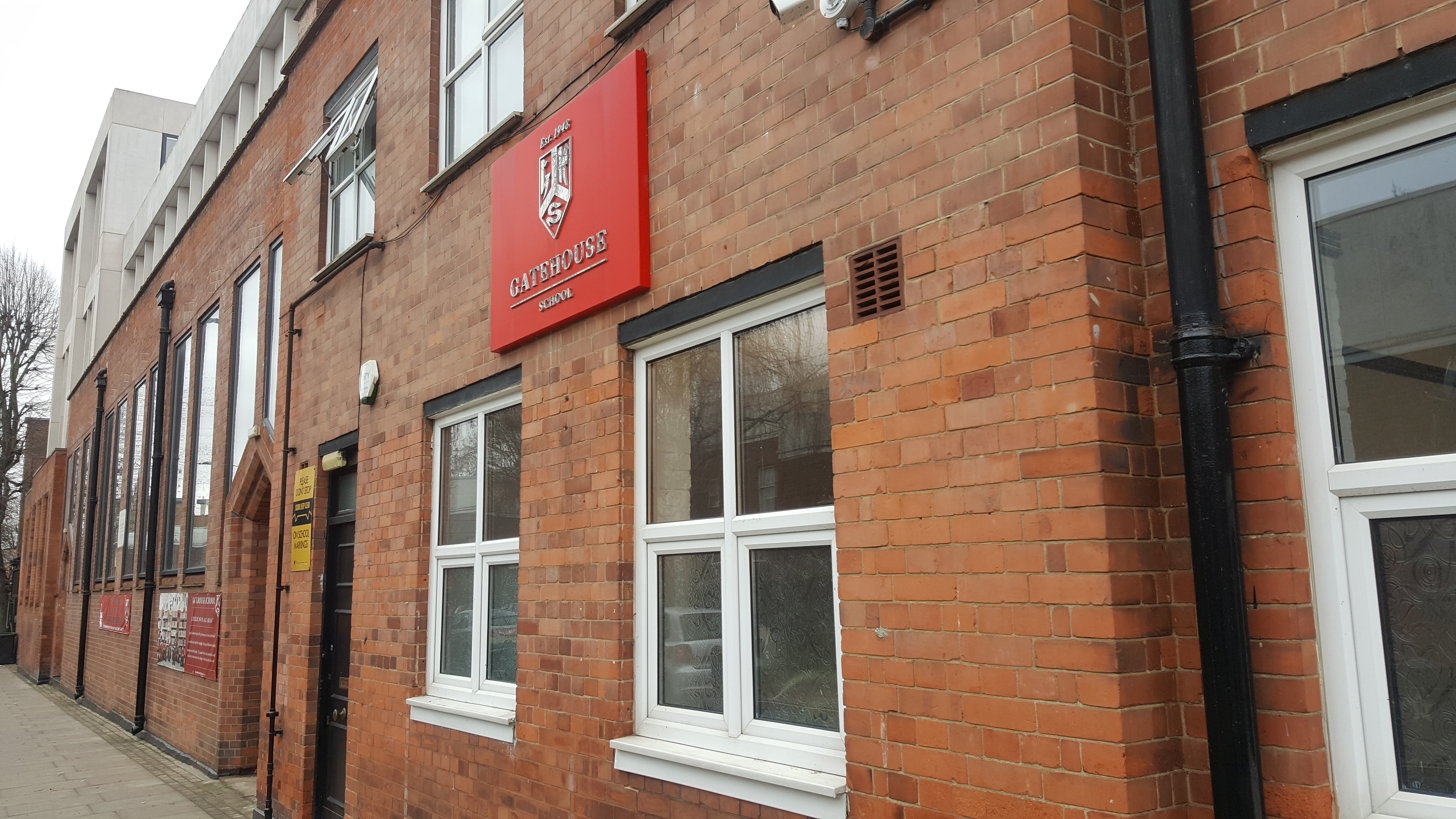

Location
- Sewardstone Road; Victoria Park; London, E2 9JG; England; 51.53214°N 0.04668°W

Information
- Type: Private school Primary school
- Established: 1948
- Founder: Phyllis Wallbank
- Local authority: Tower Hamlets
- Department for Education URN: 100980 Tables
- Gender: Coeducational
- Age: 3 to 11
- Houses: 4
- Colours: Red and white
- Website: http://www.gatehouseschool.co.uk

Gatehouse School is a co-educational independent private primary school based on Sewardstone Road in Bethnal Green, London, educating pupils from the ages of three to eleven years. The youngest classes follow a Montessori-style education, but the influence of the national curriculum has brought the older classes more in line with mainstream schools. The school admits children from the full ability range, with an emphasis on the arts, including visits to museums and theatres, as well as sports and outward bound activities.

== History ==
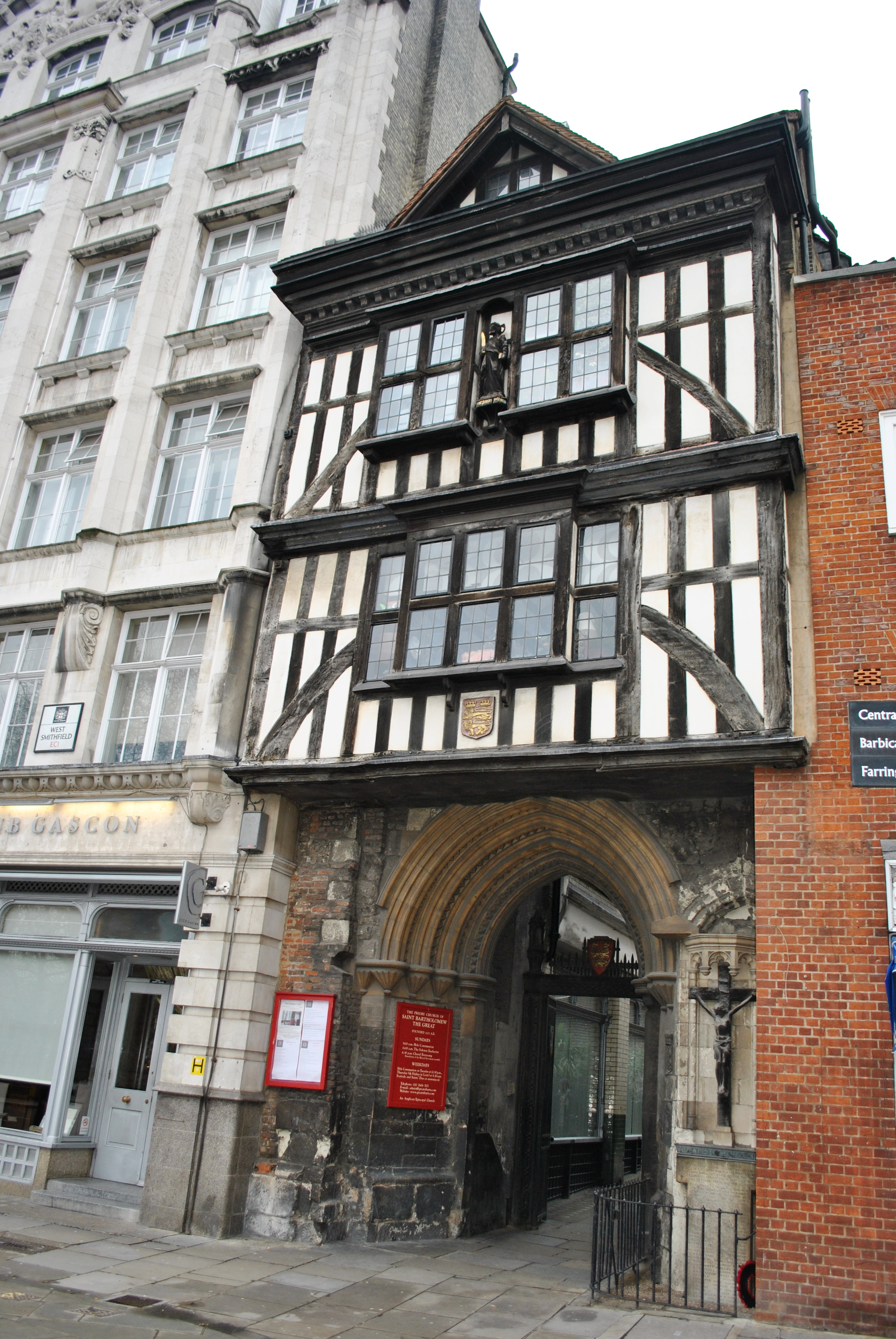
Gatehouse of St Bartholomew-the-Great church, home of the school until the 1970s

The school was founded in Smithfield, London by Phyllis Wallbank, in 1948. It was housed in the Gatehouse of St Bartholomew-the-Great church in Smithfield but moved to Bethnal Green in the 1970s. It was run along Montessori method principles developed by the educationalist Maria Montessori and began serving children from 2 – 16 years of age, and at the time of its founding, was untraditional in its educational philosophy. The school's 60th and 70th anniversaries in 2008 and in 2018 were marked by services in the school's original home, St Bartholomew's in Smithfield.

The school integrated children with a wide range of disabilities with able-bodied children. It followed the idea that true learning results from children exploring the world for themselves through play. It allowed children to choose when to take their lessons during the week. A child was required to complete a certain number of lessons in Mathematics, English, Art, Geography etc. per week but would be able to decide when to do them. Students also had free lessons where they can choose any subject they like. The balance of subjects was often weighted towards a child's aptitude or current interests. Different abilities/ages of children were taught in the same session, and their teachers 'signed pupils off' for the lessons they have completed. During that time, older children (14/15-year-olds) were allowed to take the amount of each subject they wished to do over the course of each week, resulting in some pupils spending the week doing 'what they want' e.g., Art/Monday, Geography/Tuesday, English/Wednesday, Biology/Thursday and then back to Art/Friday.

After an hour for lunch pupils had an hour to read followed by 'afternoon activities'. These included football, swimming, and visits to museums. The school also had two ponies, as well as a duck, for the children. It also had an old farm cottage just outside Clochan in Scotland.

The Gatehouse School featured in several documentary programmes during the 1970s.

The school building was renovated in 2018, bringing two new floors and a new assembly hall, named after the founder, Wallbank.

As of September 2023, the current head teacher of the school is Sevda Korbay.

== Bibliography ==
- Wallbank, Phyllis. "The Vocation of Teaching." The Sower: A Quarterly Magazine on Christian Formation.
- Wallbank, Phyllis. "Moral Teaching through Shakespeare's Tragedies." The Sower: A Quarterly Magazine on Christian Formation.
- Wallbank, Phyllis. "The Way we Learn." The Sower: A Quarterly Magazine on Christian Formation.
- Wallbank, Phyllis. "The Philosophy of International Education." Divyadaan: Journal of Philosophy and Education 12/2 (2001) 193–209.
- Wallbank, Phyllis. "Periods of Sensitivity within Human Lives." Divyadaan: Journal of Philosophy and Education 12/3 (2001) 337–384.
- Wallbank, Phyllis. "Savants." Divyadaan: Journal of Philosophy and Education 13/1 (2002) 137–140.
- Wallbank, Phyllis. "Time." Divyadaan: Journal of Philosophy and Education 14/1 (2003) 1–12.
- Wallbank, Phyllis. "Montessori and the New Century." Divyadaan: Journal of Philosophy and Education 14/2 (2003) 135–144.
- Wallbank, Phyllis. "A Universal Way of Education." Divyadaan: Journal of Philosophy and Education 15/3 (2004) 521–532.
- Wallbank, Phyllis. "Adolescence." Divyadaan: Journal of Philosophy and Education 18/1 (2007) 77–90.
- Wallbank, Phyllis. "Dr Maria Montessori: The Past, the Present and the Future." Divyadaan: Journal of Philosophy and Education 18/2 (2007) 149–158.
- Wallbank, Phyllis. "A Montessori Journey: Phyllis Wallbank celebrates the life and work of Dr Montessori." Montessori International Magazine 83 (2007) 32–33.
- Wallbank, Phyllis. "Imagination." Divyadaan: Journal of Philosophy and Education 20/1 (2009) 107–108.
- Wallbank, Phyllis. "War and Time." Divyadaan: Journal of Philosophy and Education 20/2 (2009) 255–258.
- Coelho, Ivo. Review of Phyllis Wallbank and David Fleischacker, Worldwide Natural Education: Three Important Discussion Lectures by Phyllis Wallbank MBE and Dr David Fleischacker (set of 3 DVDs). Divyadaan: Journal of Philosophy and Education 18/2 (2007) 231–233.
- Curran, Eugene. "A Method and a Model: Maria Montessori and Bernard Lonergan on Adult Education." Divyadaan: Journal of Philosophy and Education 18/2 (2007) 165–204.
- Fleischacker, David. "Understanding the Four General Sensitive Phases of Human Development from Age 0–24: Maria Montessori, Phyllis Wallbank, and Bernard Lonergan." Divyadaan: Journal of Philosophy and Education 18/2 (2007) 205–222.
- Price, Patty Hamilton. "Phyllis Wallbank and Maria Montessori." Divyadaan: Journal of Philosophy and Education 18/2 (2007) 159–164.
