= John Tolson =

John Tolson may refer to:

- John Tolson (academic) (died 1644), English academic administrator
- John Tolson (clockmaker) (1691–1737), English clockmaker and watchmaker
- John J. Tolson (1915–1991), lieutenant general in the United States Army
