= Worshipful Company of Butchers =

Livery company of the City of London

Coordinates: 51.51812°N 0.09915°W

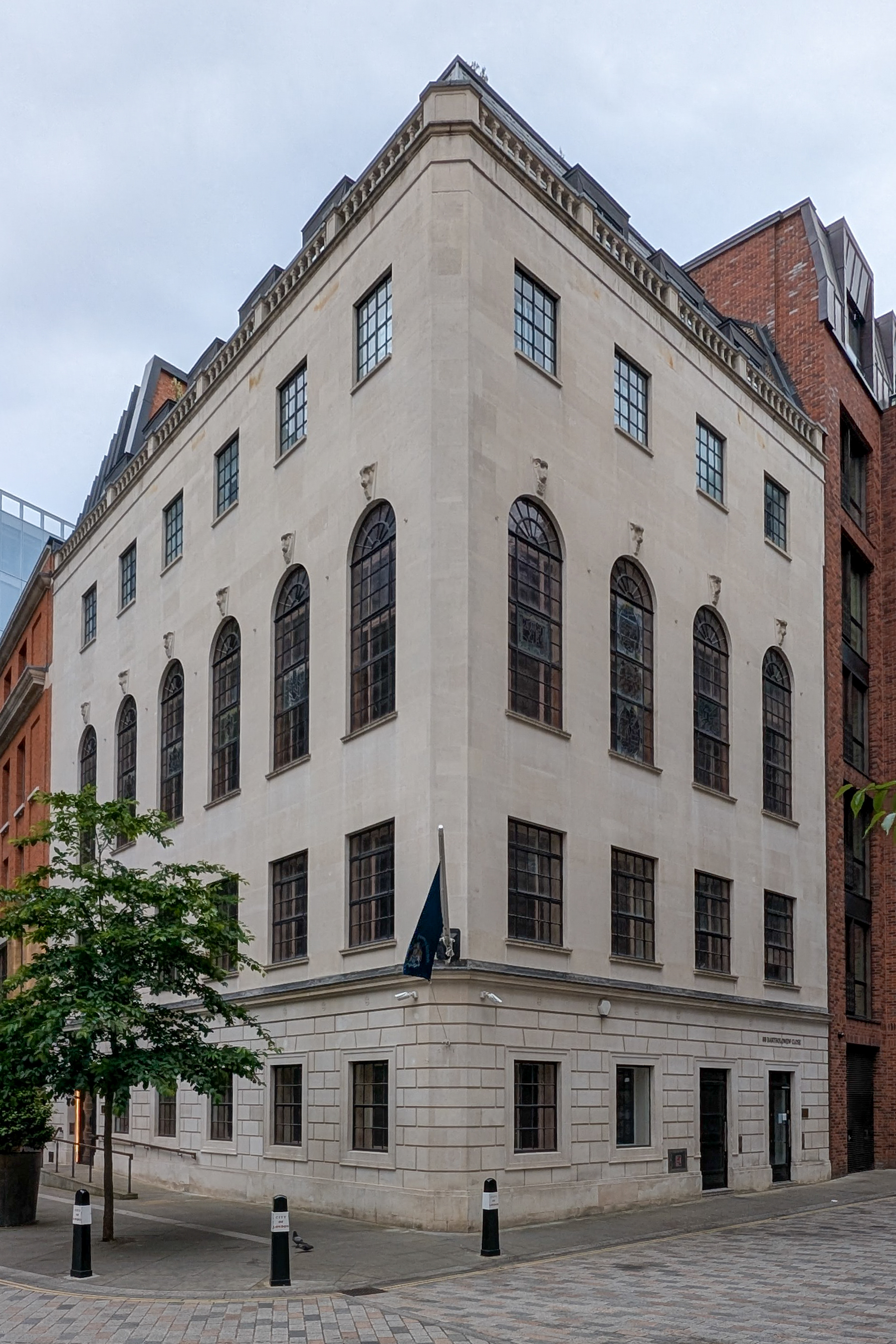
Butchers' Hall, Bartholomew Close

The Worshipful Company of Butchers is one of the Livery Companies of the City of London, England. The Butchers', unlike other Livery Companies, continues to exist as a trade association for members of the industry, instead of evolving into an institution primarily dedicated to charity. The Company contributes, like all Livery Companies, to charities.

The Company ranks twenty-fourth in the order of precedence of City Livery Companies. The Company's motto is: Omnia Subiecisti Sub Pedibus, Oves Et Boves, from the Book of Psalms and Latin for: Thou Hast Put All Things Under Man's Feet, All Sheep and Oxen.

== History ==
Records indicate that an organisation of butchers existed as early as 975. In 1331, the Butchers' Guild, the direct predecessor of the present Company, was granted the right to regulate the trade. In 1605, the Butchers' Guild was incorporated by Royal Charter.

=== Butchers' Hall ===
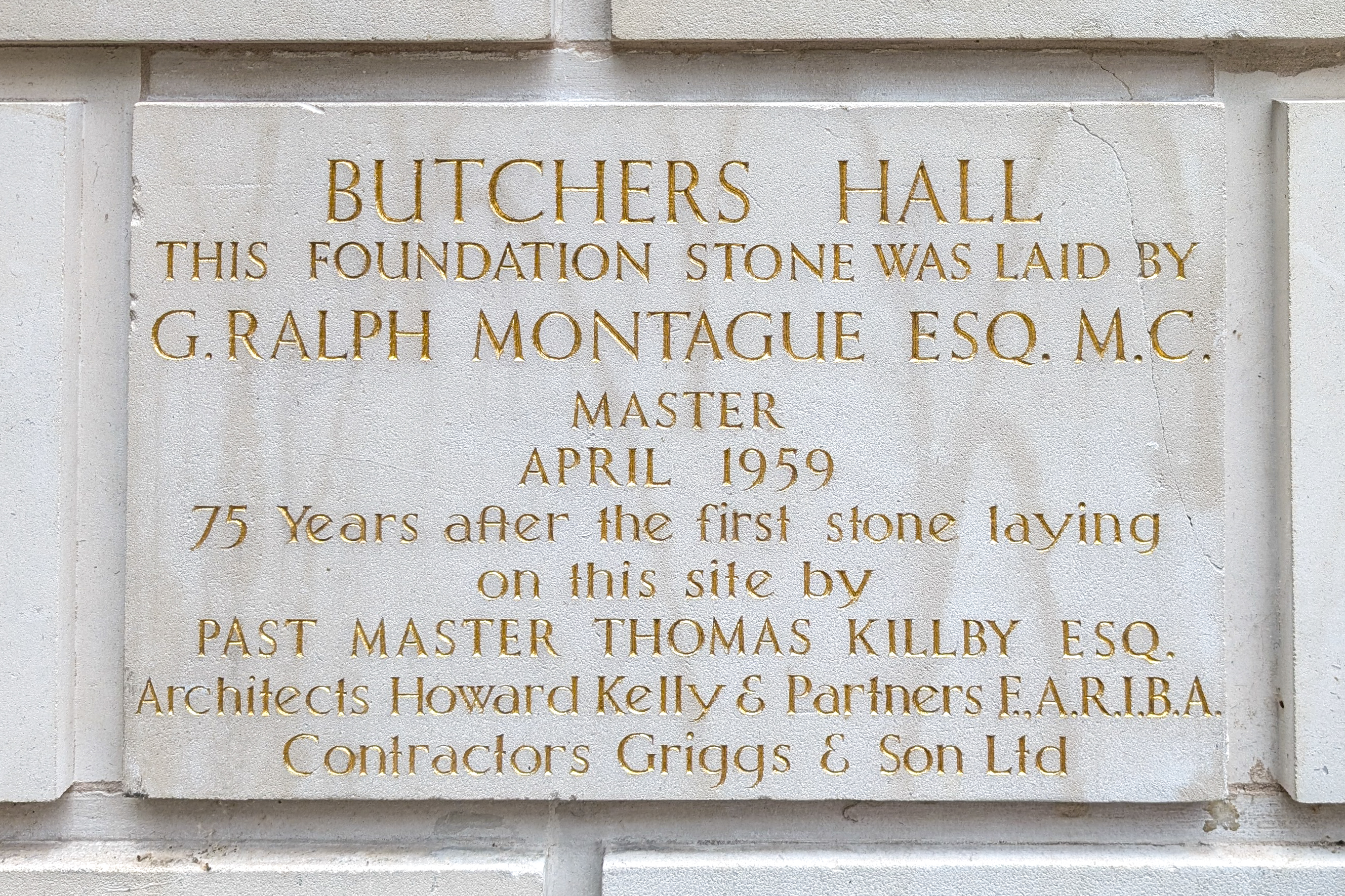
The foundation stone for the present hall

The Company's headquarters is at Butchers' Hall. The Butchers' has had several halls throughout its history. The first was located in Monkwell Street and dated from the second half of the 15th century. The next hall near St Bartholomew's Hospital was destroyed in the Great Fire of London of 1666, together with forty three other Livery Company Halls.

Its successor in Pudding Lane (1667–77) was again burnt down, rebuilt in 1829-30 and compulsorily purchased by an Act of Parliament in 1882. A new hall was built at the present site in Bartholomew Close (1884–85), which was bombed in both world wars: 1915 and again in 1944. The Company's present hall dates from 1960.

== Royal connections ==
Queen Elizabeth the Queen Mother was admitted as an Honorary Freeman of the Company in March 1976, continuing a link with the Monarchy that started with King James I in 1605; she took a constant interest in "Her Butchers". Following the Queen Mother's death in March 2002, her granddaughter, the Princess Royal was admitted to the Honorary Freedom of the Company in February 2003. Like the Queen Mother, the Princess Royal takes a keen interest in Company affairs, serving as its Master in 2011–12.

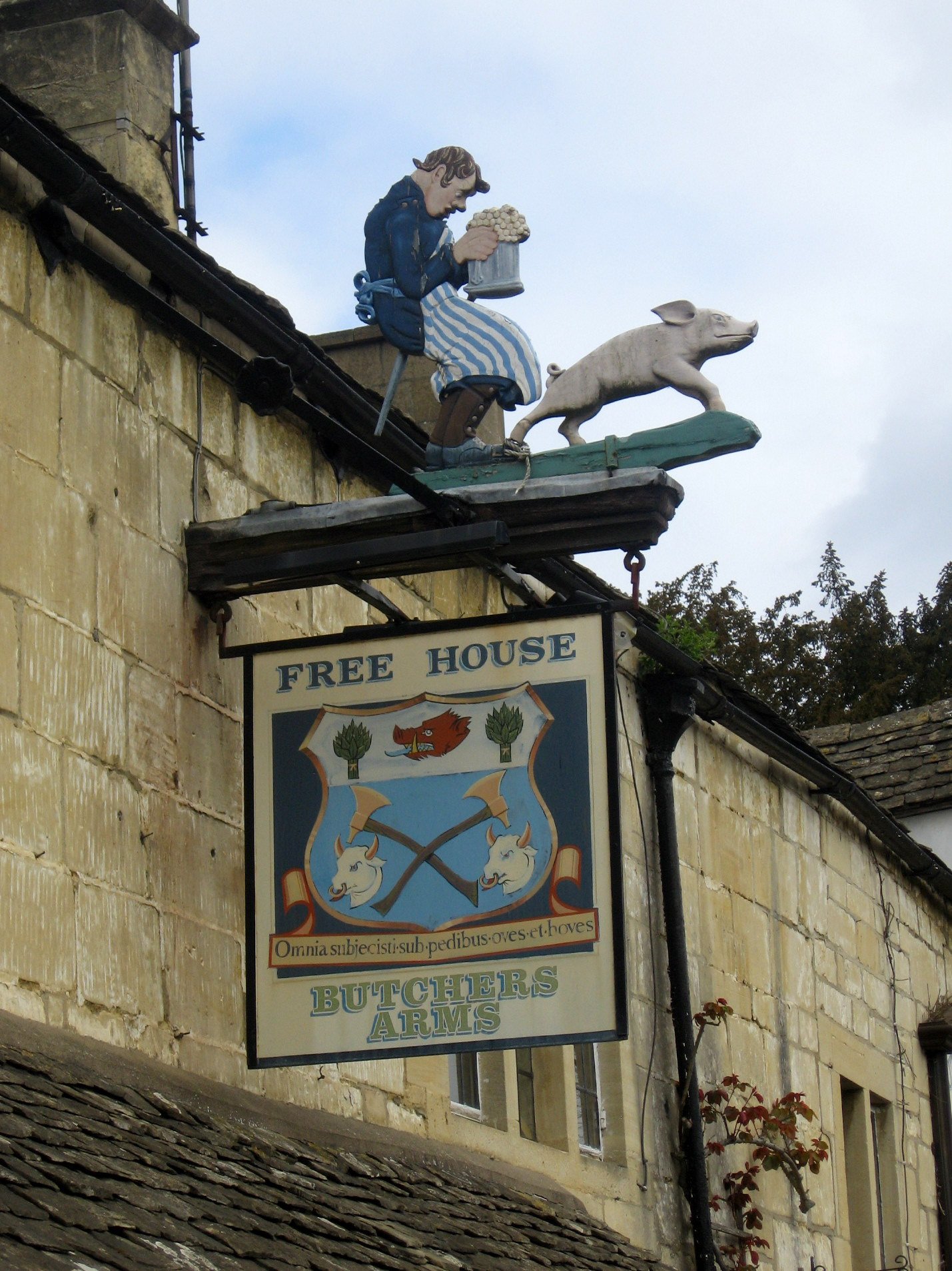
The arms used on an inn sign in Sheepscombe, Gloucestershire

== Arms of the Butchers Company ==
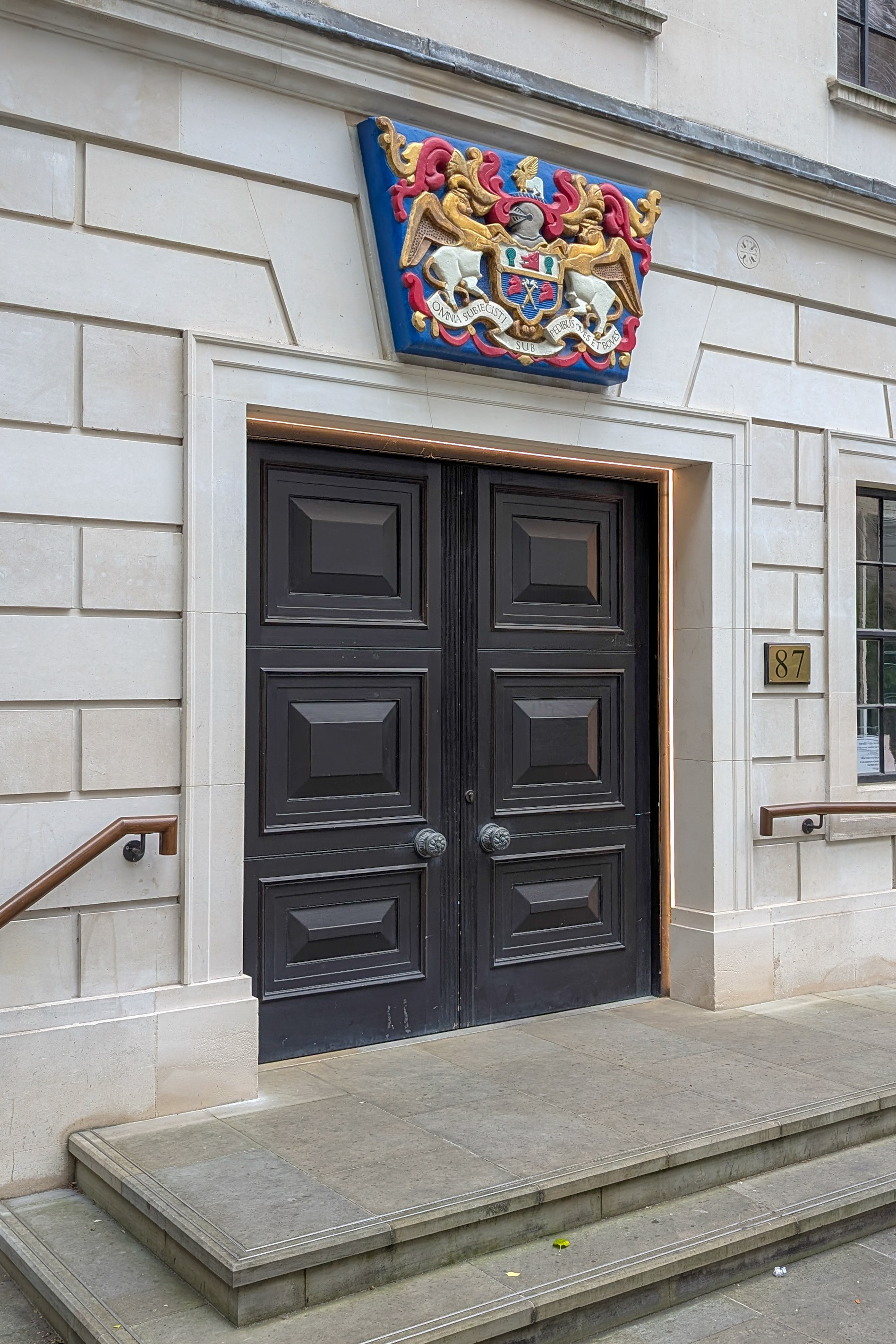
The entrance to Butchers' Hall with coat of arms

Arms: Azure two Poleaxes in saltire. Or blades inwards between two Bulls' Heads couped in fesse Argent on a Chief of the last a Boar's Head couped Gules tusked of the second langued of the first between two bunches of Knee-Holly Vert banded Gold

Crest: Upon a Helm on a Wreath of the Colours. A Bull Statant Or with wings addorsed lined Argent the head forequarters hoofs and tuft of the tail of the first the hindquarters of the second armed Gules about the Head a Nimbus Gold

Mantling: Gules doubled Argent

Supporters: On either side a Bull with wings addorsed the head forequarters wings hoofs and tuft of the tail. Or the hindquarters Argent armed Gules about the head a Nimbus of the first

== Other links ==
The Butchers' connections with the local area remain strong, with many Liverymen working at Smithfield Market.

The Butchers' Hall and St Bartholomew's Hospital have stood side by side for years, forging links that continue to this day.

The Butchers' maintains close relations with Commonwealth and international associations. For instance, the Australian High Commissioner and New Zealand High Commissioner are customarily granted the Honorary Freedom of the Company.

St Bartholomew-the-Great is the Butchers' adopted Church, and is where the Company's Annual Church Service takes place prior to Common Hall. The Honorary Chaplain to the Master Butcher is often the Rector of St Barts.

== See also ==
- Livery Company
- Smithfield Market
- St Bartholomew-the-Great
