= William Peryn =

English theologian

William Peryn (died 1558) was an English Roman Catholic priest and Dominican friar who in the reign of Mary I became prior of the short-lived Priory of St Bartholomew's, Smithfield, London.

== Life ==
Peryn was educated at Blackfriars in Oxford and there are records of him being there in 1529 and 1531, the year in which he was ordained. He went to London and was a preacher strongly against heresy, and a chaplain to Sir John Port. Soon after Henry VIII’s Royal Act of Supremacy, 1534, he went into exile, but in 1543 returned to England, when he applied for the degree of Bachelor of Theology at Oxford. He became a chantrist at St Paul's and early in 1547 preached in favour of images in religious services.

With the accession of the Protestant Edward VI in 1547, Peryn went into exile again, spending several years in Louvain before returning to England in 1553 upon the accession of the Roman Catholic Mary I. That year, he was appointed prior of the Dominican house at St Bartholomew's in Smithfield, London, the first religious house founded by Mary. On 8 February 1556 Peryn is recorded by the diarist Henry Machyn as preaching at Paul's Cross.

Peryn was the author of three books: Thre Godly Sermons of the Sacrament of the Aulter (1546); Spirituall exercyses and goostly meditacions, and a neare waye to come to perfection and lyfe contemplatyve (1557); and De frequenter celebranda missa (of which no copy survives).

The three godly sermons were originally preached at St Anthony's Hospital in London and are dedicated to Edmund Bonner, Bishop of London. Peryn borrowed heavily from Bishop of Rochester John Fisher's De veritate corporis et sanguinis Christi in eucharistia, and in a preface he explains why he has published the sermons:

... in homely and playne sentens, by cause that I have cheflye prepared them ... for the unlearned. And the veryte (beyng delectable and bewtifull of herselfe) nedeth not, the gorgius ornamentes, of eloquens. Also the matters of our fayth, hath moche lesse nede of rethoricall perswacyons, havynge theyr grond, and fundacyon, upon the infallyble veritie, of goddes holy worde.

Peryn's Spirituall exercyses was dedicated to two exiled English nuns: Katherine Palmer, abbess of the nuns at Syon in Isleworth, and Dorothy Clement, a Poor Clare at Louvain and the daughter of Sir Thomas More's adopted daughter Margaret Clement. It was also based on Nicolaus van Esch's Exercitia theologiae mysticae. This work by Peryn was to have a long readership among English recusants and was much treasured by Margaret Clitheroe. It would be republished by a Catholic press of Caen in 1598.

Peryn died in 1558 and was buried in St Bartholomew's on 22 August, at the high altar.
