= Phyllis Wallbank =

British educationalist (1918–2020)

Phyllis Wallbank MBE
- Born: Phyllis Gardner; 1 September 1918
- Died: 9 April 2020 (aged 101)
- Occupation: Educator
- Known for: Founder, Gatehouse School; Founder, Montessori education in the UK
- Spouse: Revd Prebendary Newell Eddius Wallbank
- Awards: Member of the Order of the British Empire (1996); Benemerenti Medal (1996)

Phyllis Wallbank, MBE (née Gardner; 1 September 1918 – 9 April 2020) was a British educationalist who, in 1948, founded the first all-age Montessori school in Great Britain and the Gatehouse Learning Centre, which took its name from the gatehouse of the Priory Church of St Bartholomew the Great in London.

== Life ==
Wallbank began as a Froebel-trained teacher. Working in juvenile courts as a children's officer in Buckinghamshire, however, she realised that far fewer children would become delinquent if they could be educated to assume their own personal responsibilities and so take their rightful place in society. To do this, she trained under Maria Montessori and became a personal friend. In Montessori's later years, she served as her co-examiner for both the ordinary and the advanced courses. She served as Chairperson of the Montessori Association in England and as Vice-President of the International Montessori Association. She also organised the last International Montessori Congress, which met in London shortly before Montessori's death. William J. Codd, Professor of Education at Seattle University, wrote of Wallbank: "The one on whom the robe of Montessori should fall to carry on the living tradition."

Wallbank was married to the Revd Prebendary Newell Eddius Wallbank, a long-time rector of St Bartholomew the Great in Smithfield and a noted musician and scholar of the pipe organ. It was in the priory church's gatehouse that Wallbank began the Gatehouse School, becoming the Gatehouse Learning Centre, later expanding to Great Missenden.

Through the educational philosophy of Montessori, Wallbank was drawn to the Catholic Church: she felt that Montessori's method naturally demanded the Catholic understanding of the Eucharist. She became a Catholic but was advised by her spiritual director to remain "underground" so as not to embarrass her husband.

After retirement, Wallbank and her husband moved out of London to Dorney near Eton, where they had a house on the Common. Both were involved in different ways with Eton College, with her husband conducting services for BBC broadcasts and she coaching the weaker students and introducing them to her Slough Run.

Shortly before the death of her husband, Canon Timothy Russ introduced Wallbank to the writings of the Canadian philosopher and theologian Fr Bernard Lonergan SJ, CC. She found in Lonergan a philosophy that was deeply consonant with Montessori's educational practice and convictions. She subsequently lectured at the annual Lonergan Workshop at Boston College; some of her lectures were published in the proceedings of the workshop.

The Phyllis Wallbank Educational Trust was founded to continue her educational thinking and expertise.

Wallbank remained retired in Dorney, where she continued to be active, entertaining international scholars at her home and communicating with a wide variety of people after having embraced the internet.

== Educational activities ==
St Bartholomew the Great Priory Church's coat of arms

The Gatehouse Learning Centre was "known for its distinguished graduates as well as its integration of exceptional students into the regular classroom." Wallbank has lectured at a wide variety of colleges and conferences as well as university courses and lectures under various titles. In particular, she designed the distance learning course of the College of Modern Montessori. In retirement in Dorney, she was called upon by Eton College as a visiting teacher. In 2007 and 2008, in her late eighties, she went on Montessori World Tours giving lectures on Montessori education.

== Charitable and social activities ==
Besides her innovations in the field of education, Wallbank was also involved in creative charitable and social initiatives. In 1985, she began the London Run, a new ministry dedicated to helping homeless and destitute people living by the Thames Embankment. Some years later, she also began the Slough Run. Her London and Slough Runs continue to function, with people of all persuasions and faiths spontaneously gathering together on Monday evenings on a street corner in Slough, and offering food and drink with dignity to street people. In 1990, a charitable trust was established to manage the activities of the London Run and Slough Run.

== Honours ==
- 1996 - Member of the Order of the British Empire (MBE), conferred by Queen Elizabeth II
- 1996 - Benemerenti Medal, conferred by Pope John Paul II
