= John Tolson (clockmaker) =

English clockmaker and watchmaker

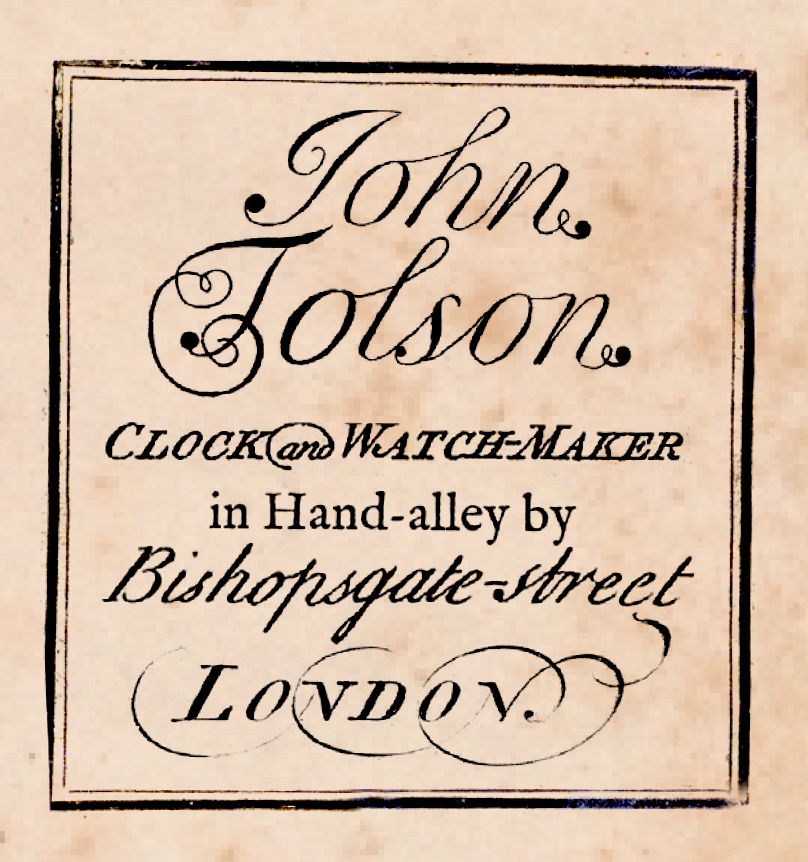
- Born: 1691; City of London
- Died: 1737 (aged 45–46); London
- Occupations: Clock- and watchmaker

Signature
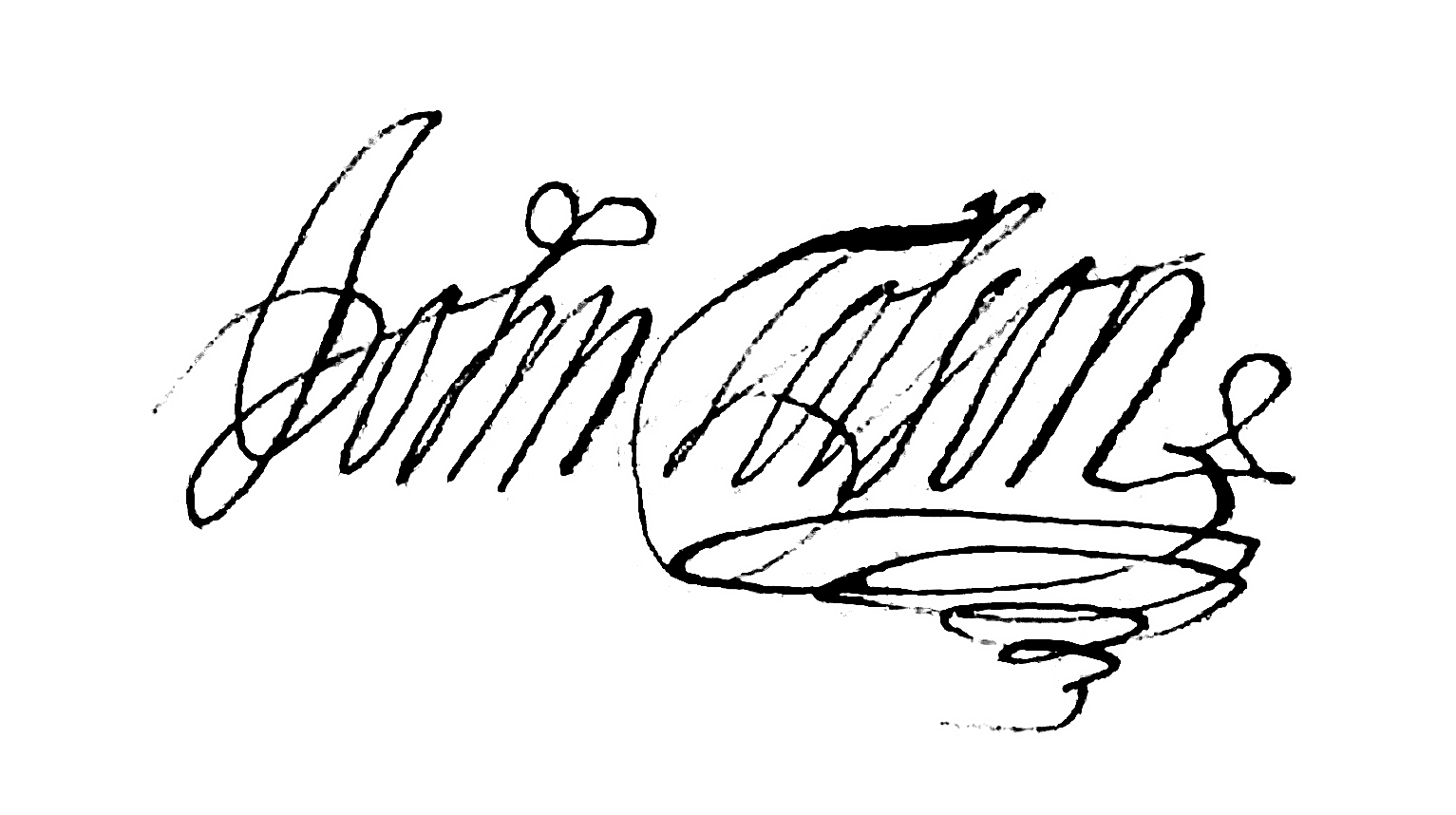

John Tolson (1691–1737) was an important if elusive English clockmaker and watchmaker of the early eighteenth century who, while not particularly remarkable for his invention, is noteworthy because of the fine quality of his clocks and watches. The style of his early longcase clocks owes much to Thomas Tompion, and the delicate functionality of his early longcase wheelwork echoes Tompion's standards. His short career of 22 years before an early death in 1737 makes his clocks and watches relatively rare and they can command high prices whenever outstanding examples appear at auction.

== Biography ==
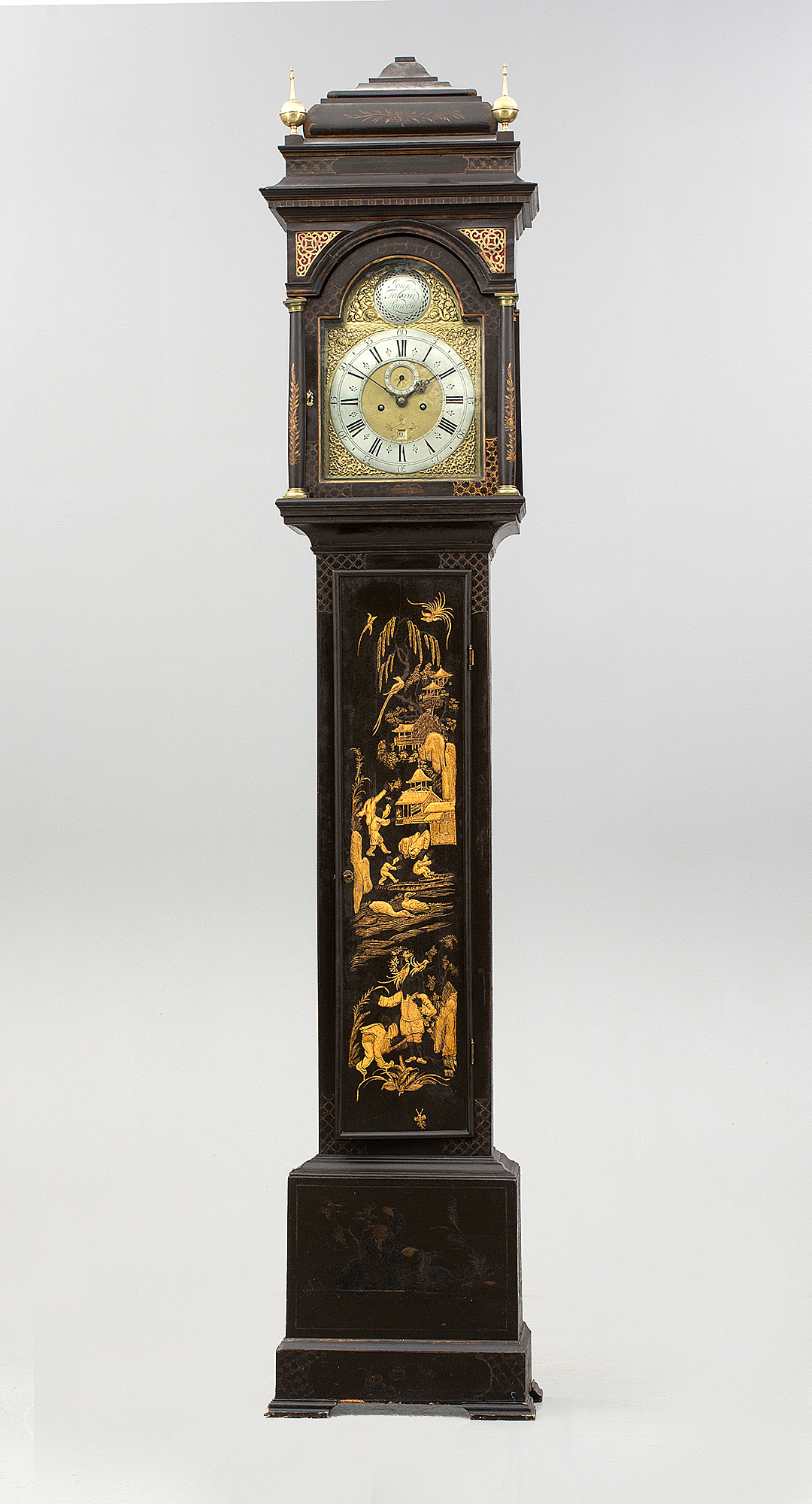
A fine and beautifully proportioned lacquer longcase clock made by John Tolson, circa 1735

=== Early life ===
John Tolson was born in 1691 in the City of London and was baptised on 30 November 1691 in St Magnus the Martyr. He was the eldest surviving son of John Tolson, a member of the Worshipful Company of Merchant Taylors and his wife Alice (born in 1668) the daughter of Richard Rookes, a vintner, and Frances née Dryden and a cousin of the poets Dryden and Swift. The Tolsons are an old family originally from the West Riding of Yorkshire.

John Tolson was apprenticed for seven years to John Rayner on 3 May 1708 in the reign of Queen Anne and became a Freeman of the Worshipful Company of Clockmakers on 2 May 1715 in the first year of George I's reign. In 1717 Tolson established premises in Hand-alley (now New Street), near Bishopsgate Street, where he continued to make clocks and watches until his early death in 1737, which is no doubt why his clocks and watches are rather rare.

=== Career and later life ===
John Tolson’s only apprentice was John Nicholson, the son of Thomas Nicholson of Stapleford Tawney, Essex, Gent, who was indentured to him for seven years on 5 May 1718. John Tolson married Mary Gillett (born in 1696 and believed to be the daughter of the Huguenot Jacques Gylet, an identification perhaps strengthened by the Huguenot watchmaker Louis Gaudin having also had premises in Hand-alley at the beginning of the 18th century) at St Bartholomew the Great on 29 November 1717, by whom he had one son, John, born in 1722 and baptised at St Botolph-without-Bishopsgate on 20 July 1722. Mary Tolson died in 1724 aged 28 and was buried at St Botolph-without-Bishopsgate on 28 September of that year. John Tolson died in Hand-alley in 1737 aged 45, and was interred with his wife at St Botolph-without-Bishopsgate on 11 June of the same year.

The renowned clockmaker Ralph Tolson, who also died in 1737, is believed to have been his near relation.

== Additional works ==
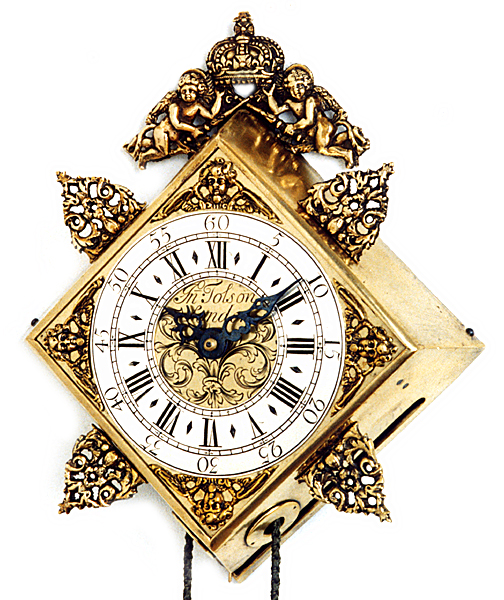
An unusual diamond wall clock made by John Tolson, circa 1720

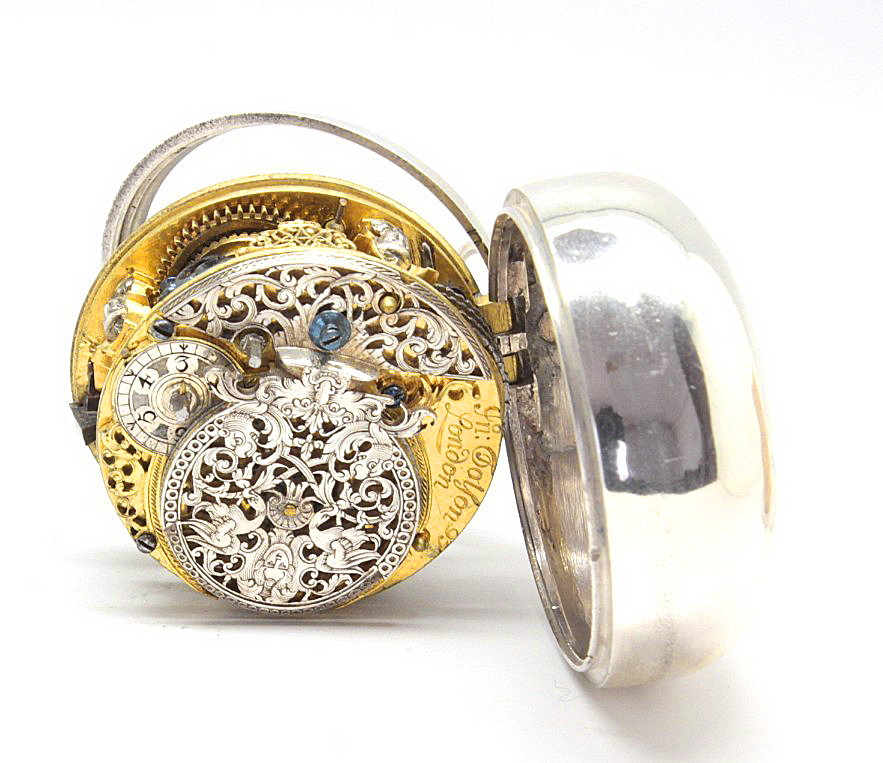
Numbered movement of silver pair-cased watch made by John Tolson circa 1718

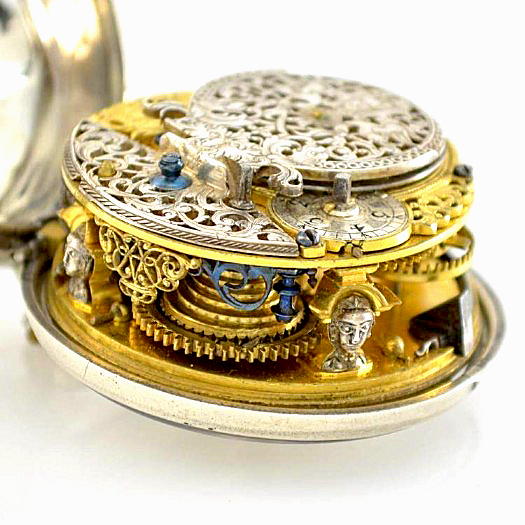
Exceptionally fine pillars and movement of a John Tolson watch
