= Brian Brockless =

English composer, organist and conductor

- Born: January 21, 1926; London, England
- Died: December 18, 1995 (aged 69)
- Genres: Classical
- Occupation(s): Composer, Organist, Conductor, Choral Trainer, Educator
- Instrument(s): Organ, Voice (counter-tenor)

Brian Brockless (21 January 1926 – 18 December 1995) was an English composer, organist and conductor and, for much of his life, was the Director of Music at the Priory Church of St Bartholomew-the-Great, Smithfield, London where he succeeded Paul Steinitz in 1961. He was a much respected Choral Trainer and his annual performances of Bach's St John Passion were noted for their musicality. He was the founder of Pro Cantione Antiqua, originally known as the St Bartholomew Singers.

== Career ==
Brockless was born in London, the son of an amateur French horn player and baritone. He was inspired by music from a very young age along with his sister Pauline, who herself became a fine soprano and performed regularly at the Proms.

Brockless studied organ and composition at the Royal College of Music under the direction of Herbert Howells, a great influence on the young composer. Howells' influence can be seen most in "An English Elegy", dedicated to Howells and originally the slow movement of a quartet written for his BMus degree. Brockless went on to study conducting with Sergiu Celibidache at the Accademia Musicale, Siena, Italy (where he won the conducting prize in 1963). He subsequently worked with Celibidache in Europe and Scandinavia.

For twenty years Brockless was a part-time professor at the Royal Academy of Music and was subsequently made an Honorary Member. He was also senior lecturer at the University of Surrey and taught at Goldsmith's and Morley colleges.

Among the orchestras he conducted were The London Schubert Orchestra (founded by George Schubert, Brockless was musical director), the English Chamber Orchestra, the Royal Philharmonic Orchestra, Philomusica of London, Northern Sinfonia and The Royal Philharmonic Orchestra. He gave concerts (With The London Schubert Orchestra) in Romania, Palermo, Stockholm, Brussels, Venezuela, Denmark, as well as conducting choral and orchestral performances for the BBC, Belgian, Swedish and Danish Radio Orchestras. He pioneered the presentation of Choral music on TV with the ITV series "A Date With Music".

As well as conductor and composer, Brockless had a fine counter-tenor voice which he employed along with his sister Pauline in Wigmore Hall recitals, as a choir member of the Savoy Chapel, Schola Polyphonica and the Elizabethan Singers.

In 1971 Brockless left St Bartholomew's due to the pressure of work but returned as Director of Music again in 1979. He remained there for the rest of his life.

Brockless's hobbies included cricket, ornithology, and reading.

=== Works ===
Brockless' compositions are published by Novello

- There is a Garden in Her Face (S.A.T.B a capella, 1953)
- To Thee, O Lord, Our Hearts We Raise (1953)
- May the Grace of Christ (S.A.T.B, 1955)
- Christ is now Arisen Agayne (S.A.T.B, 1958)
- Now Blessed Be Thou, Christ Jesu (S.A.T.B, 1959)
- Prelude, Toccata and Chaconne (Organ, 1959)
- An English Elegy (Strings, 1960)
- Behold Now, Praise the Lord (Voices & Organ)
- Introduction, Passacaglia and Coda (Organ, 1967 – Commissioned by Westminster Abbey for Francis Jackson)
- Come, Holy Spirite (1976 rev. 1985)
- Toccata for an Occasion (Organ, 1982 – Commissioned for The Peterborough Organ Festival)
- Toccatina (Organ, 1989)

=== Other works ===
- Missa Brevis
- Three Poems of Shelley (Contralto & Piano)
- Toccata upon Tallis's Twelfth Tone (Organ)
- Intrada
- This Spiritual House
- Fantasia, Adagio and Fugue (Organ)

=== Recordings ===
- Prelude, Toccata and Chaconne – Amphion PHI CD 175
- Songs of Heaven and Earth – Guild Music GMCD 7165
