= Rahere =

Anglo-Norman priest

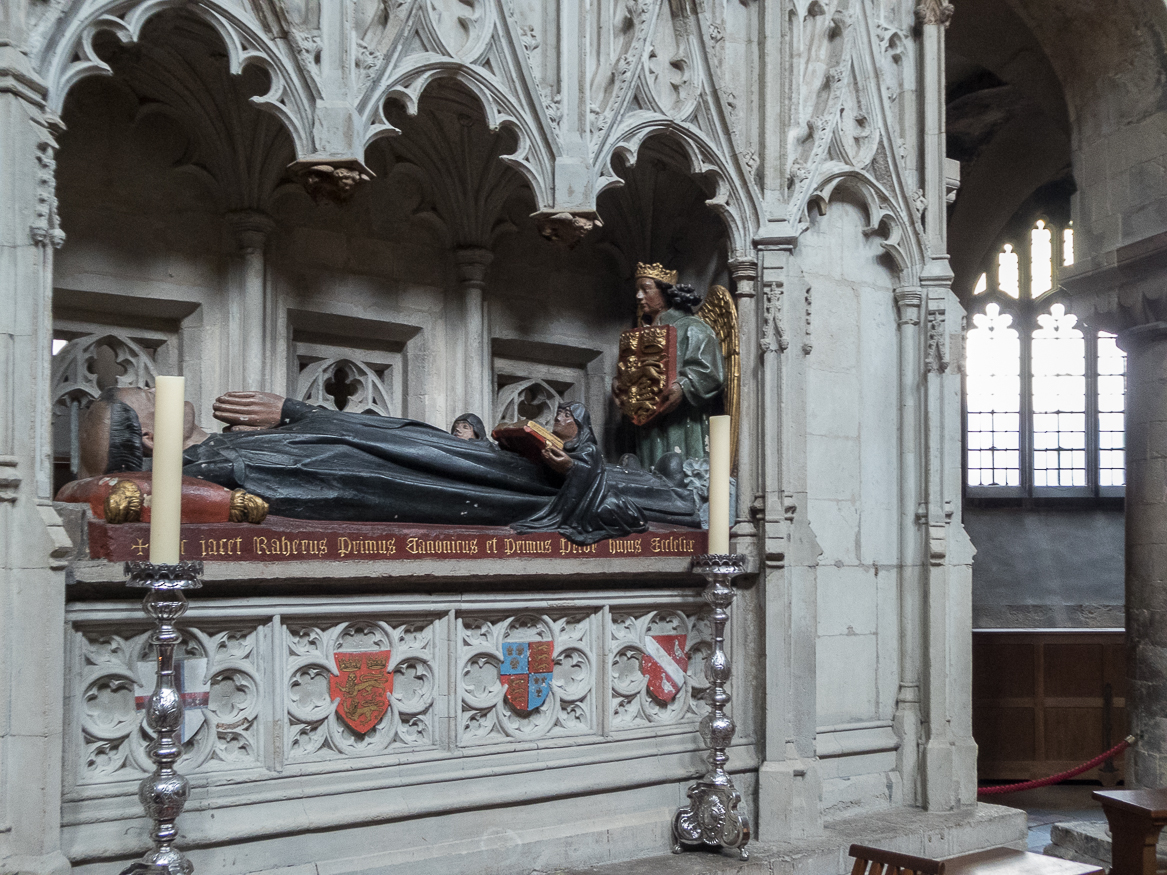
Rahere's tomb in St Bartholomew the Great

Rahere (pronounced [ɹaˈhɪə(ɹ)]), or Raher or Raherius, was a 12th-century Anglo-Norman priest and later canon regular. He was a favourite of King Henry I and is most famous for having founded St Bartholomew's Priory and the Hospital of St Bartholomew in 1123.

== Life ==
Many of the details of Rahere's life have become confused, having been variously described as a cleric, a courtier, a minstrel and a jester, but Rahere undoubtedly existed and did many of the things in the legends about him. He may at different times in his life have been all of these.

Rahere is listed as a canon of St Paul's Cathedral in a document of 1115. On a pilgrimage to Rome, he fell ill and had a reputed vision of St Bartholomew, who directed him to establish a religious hospital. Upon his return to England, he followed this calling and founded a community of Canons Regular at Smithfield in London, being installed as its prior, a position he held until his death.

An ornate tomb monument in his memory can be found inside the Priory Church of St Bartholomew the Great. This appears to have been erected in about 1400 (perhaps initially for another individual), with the recumbent effigy of Rahere and the figure of an angel at his feet added around a century later, in the early Tudor period.

== In popular culture ==
Rahere is the subject of Rudyard Kipling's poem "Rahere", collected in Debits and Credits, as well as being a major figure in Kipling's story "The Tree of Justice", featuring in Rewards and Fairies.

He is also a significant character in Rosemary Sutcliff's historical novel for children, The Witch's Brat (1970). It seems likely that Sutcliff was first introduced to Rahere by reading Rewards and Fairies as a child and later chose him as a character for one of her own books; Kipling's works are a significant and openly acknowledged inspiration for Sutcliff.

Alan Gordon acknowledges Rahere in the historical notes to Thirteenth Night (1999), the first book in his "Fools Guild" series of historical novels.
