= Pauline Brockless =

Pauline Dorothy Brockless (4 May 1929 – 27 March 2015) was a soprano whose heyday was in the 1950s when she performed in Beethoven's Choral Symphony during the Promenade Concerts under Malcolm Sargent.

Brockless was born in Muswell Hill, north London, on May 4, 1929, the youngest of three children. Her father Gilbert Brockless had worked for Lloyd's of London and was a keen amateur baritone and horn player, while her mother, Dorothy, was an amateur pianist. In 1958 she sang in the memorable recording of Bach's St Matthew Passion conducted by Vaughan Williams at Leith Hill Festival six months before his death. There were also appearances with her brother, the countertenor Brian Brockless who died in 1995, at venues such as the Wigmore Hall and the Savoy Chapel.

In the 1960s her career was cut short by mental illness. However, she did make some later performances.

== See also ==
- Brian Brockless (brother)
