= St Bartholomew-the-Great =

Coordinates: 51°31′7.92″N 0°05′58.77″W

St Bartholomew the Great
- Priory Church of Saint Bartholomew the Great
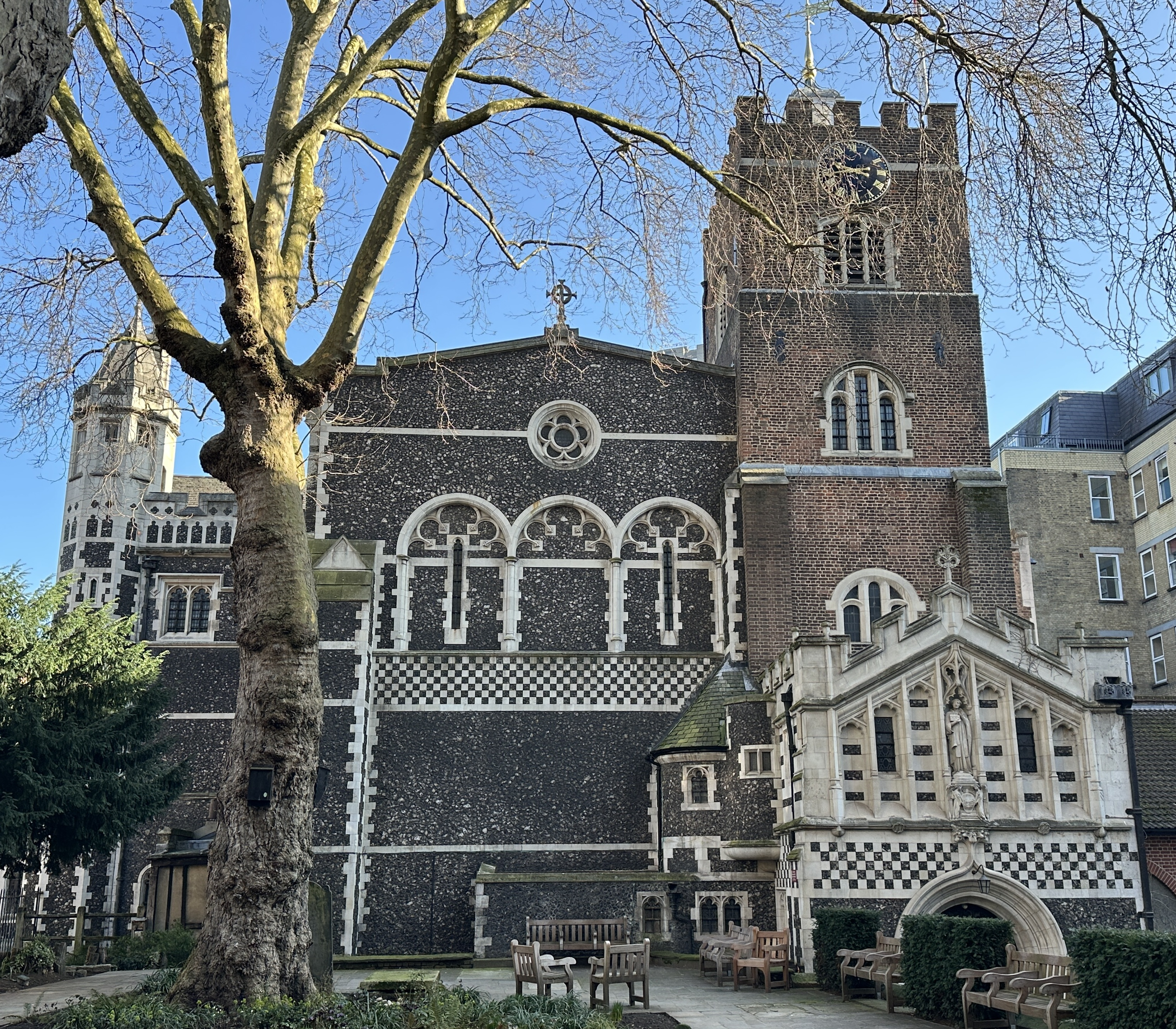
- West facade

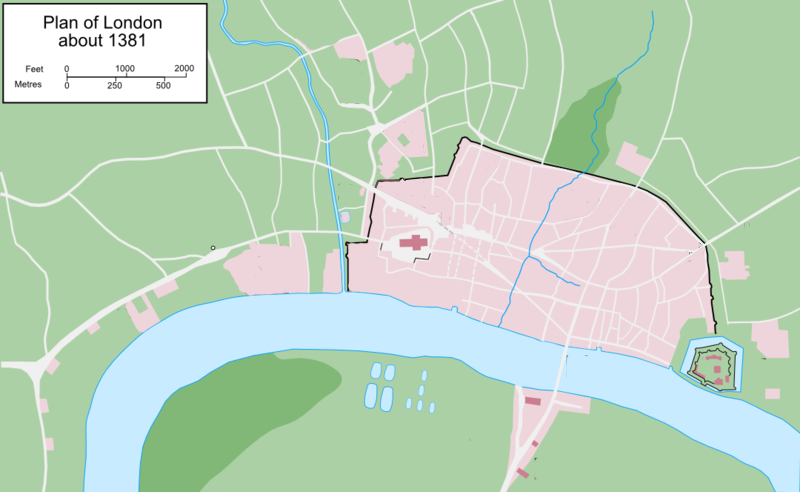
- Location within City of London Location within City of London in 1300
- Location: London, EC1
- Country: England
- Denomination: Church of England
- Previous denomination: Roman Catholicism
- Tradition: Prayer Book Catholic
- Website: greatstbarts.com

History
- Founded: 1123
- Founder: Rahere
- Dedication: Bartholomew the Apostle

Architecture
- Heritage designation: Grade I listed building
- Style: Norman

Administration
- Province: Canterbury
- Diocese: London
- Parish: Great St Bartholomew

Clergy
- Bishop(s): Sarah Mullally, Bishop of London
- Rector: Fr. Marcus Walker

The Priory Church of St Bartholomew the Great, sometimes abbreviated to St-Barts-the-Great, is a medieval church in the Church of England's Diocese of London located in Smithfield within the City of London. The building was founded as an Augustinian priory in 1123. It adjoins St Bartholomew's Hospital of the same foundation.

St Bartholomew the Great is named to distinguish it from its neighbouring smaller church of St Bartholomew the Less, founded at the same time and now a chapel of ease. The two parish churches were reunited in 2012 under the benefice of Great St Bartholomew. Today the buildings houses a parish with services taking place in both buildings.

== History ==
=== Medieval Priory ===
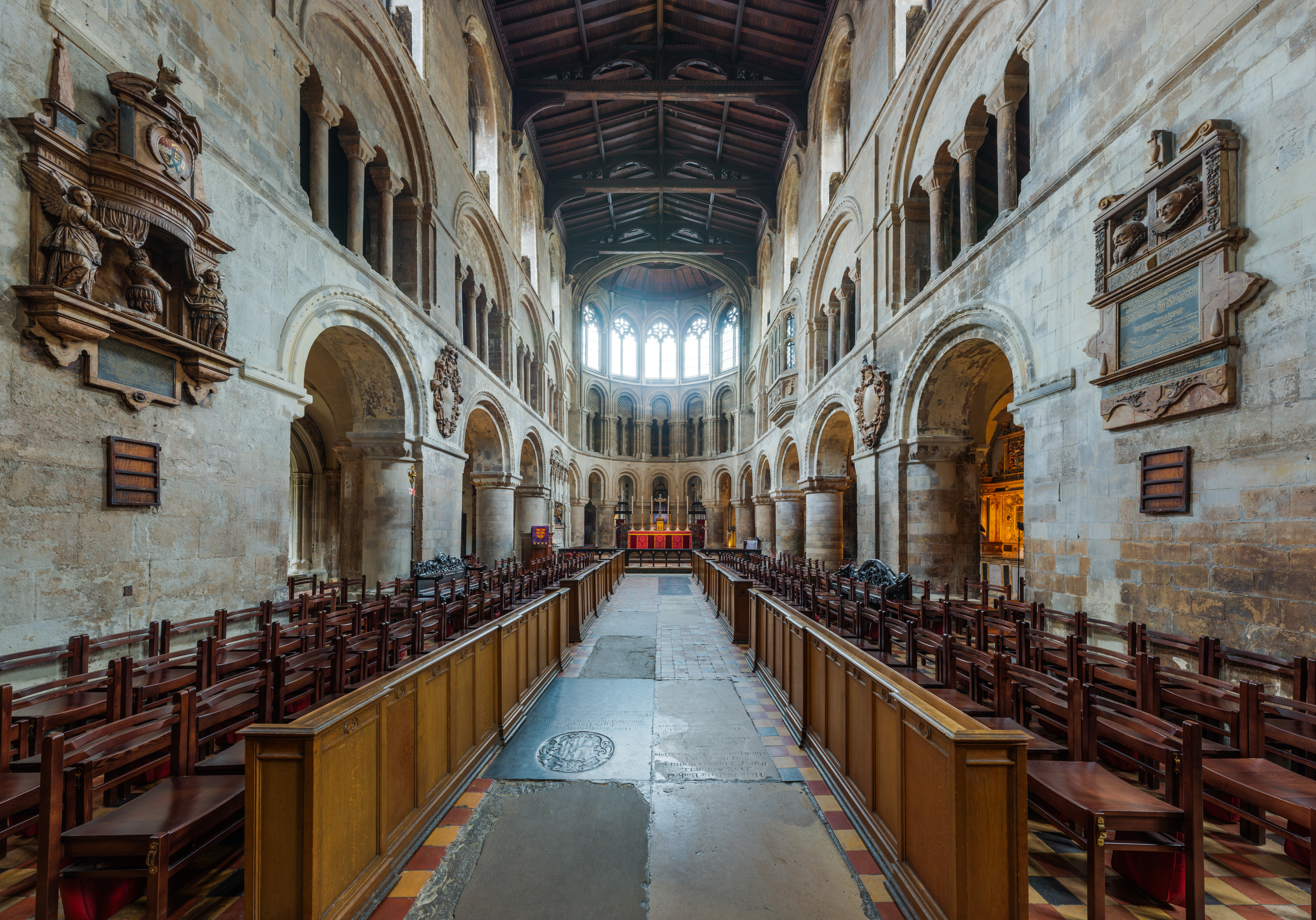
Interior facing east: Sanctuary in centre with Sir Robert Chamberlayne's monument (1615) on the left wall, opposite a memorial tablet to Alderman Sir John Percival and Agnes Smallpace

The church was founded in 1123 by Rahere, a prebendary of St Paul's Cathedral and an Augustinian canon regular. While at the Vatican, Rahere dreamed that a winged beast came and transported him to a high place, then relayed a message from "the High Trinity and...the court of Heaven" that he was to erect a church in London's Smithfield. Rahere travelled to London and was informed that the area in his vision – then a small cemetery – was royal property, and could not be built upon. Henry I, however, granted title of the land to Rahere upon hearing his divine message.

Rahere started construction on the building with the use of servants and child labourers, who collected stones from all over London.

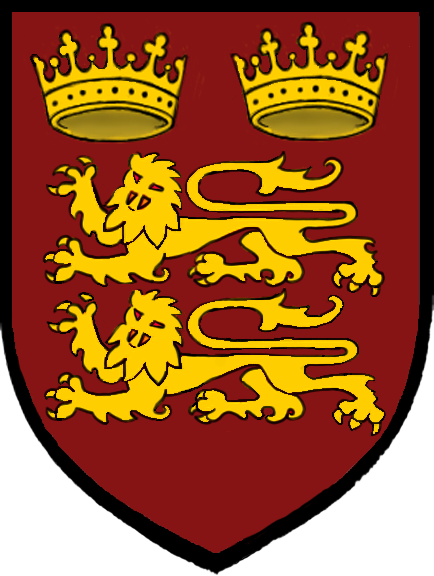
Arms of the Priory Church of St Bartholomew the Great

The priory gained a reputation for curative powers, with many sick people filling its aisles, notably on 24 August (St Bartholomew's Day). Many miracles were attributed to occur within and without the walls of the building, including "a light sent from heaven" from its first foundation, and especially miraculous healings; many serious disabilities were claimed to be cured after a visit. Many of these cures were undertaken at the church hospital, the still existing St Bartholomew's Hospital.

The Peasants' Revolt meeting between Wat Tyler and King Richard II on Saturday, June 15th 1381, in Smithfield, is where the revolt directly touches the history of St. Bartholomew's. The king's retinue, with the Mayor of London William Walworth, were drawn up on the east side of Smithfield, immediately in front of the doors of St. Bartholomew's church, whilst Wat Tyler's men were in battle array on the west side. When Tyler, for his insolence in drawing his dagger before the king, had been struck down by Walworth, the accounts differ as to what was done with his body. Henry Knighton, a contemporary compiler, says in his chronicle that he was 'rudely drawn by his hands and feet into the church of St. Bartholomew which was at hand', but the 'Anominal Chronicle of St. Mary's York', written probably by an eye-witness, says that Tyler was 'carried by some of the commons to the Hospital for poor folks, by St. Bartholomew's, and was put to bed in the chamber of the master of the hospital', and this is probably correct. Neither the priory nor the hospital buildings were damaged by the rioters, so far as is known.

=== Dissolution ===
The last Prior was Robert Fuller, the Abbot of Waltham Holy Cross. He was favoured by King Henry VIII, indeed was invited to attend the christening of Prince Edward, and acquiesced in the dissolution of his Priory.

While many of the Priory's buildings survived the Dissolution of the Monasteries, about half of the priory's church was ransacked for building materials then demolished in 1543.. The nave was pulled down up to the last bay although the lofty crossing arches and choir survive largely intact from the Norman and later Middle Ages, enabling the surviving parts to be converted from priory for use as a parish church.

The dissolved Priory's buildings to the South and East were granted in December 1546 to a newly founded and royaly endowed St Bartholomew's Hospital which continues to the present day the care for the sick initiated by the medieval Priory.

=== Later history ===
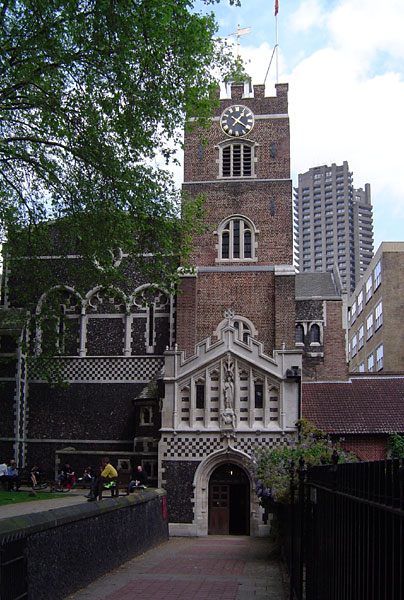
Entrance to the church

The church and some of the priory buildings were briefly used as the third Dominican friary (Black Friars) of London, refounded by Queen Mary I of England in 1556 and closed in 1559. Having escaped the Great Fire of London of 1666, the surviving parts of the church fell into disrepair.

Fragmentary remains of the West entrance to the church remain on West Smithfield, recognisable by its half-timbered, late 16th-century, Tudor frontage built on top of the 13th-century stone archway. This adaptation may have been carried out by the Dominican friars in the 1550s, or by the post-Reformation patron of the advowson, Lord Rich, Lord Chancellor of England (1547–51).. From this gatehouse to the west door of the church, the modern entrance path leads roughly along the alignment of the demolished south aisle.

In the early 1720s, at the suggestion of Governor of Pennsylvania Sir William Keith Bt, the American polymath and patriot Benjamin Franklin worked as a typesetter in a printer's shop in what is now the Church of St Bartholomew-the-Great.

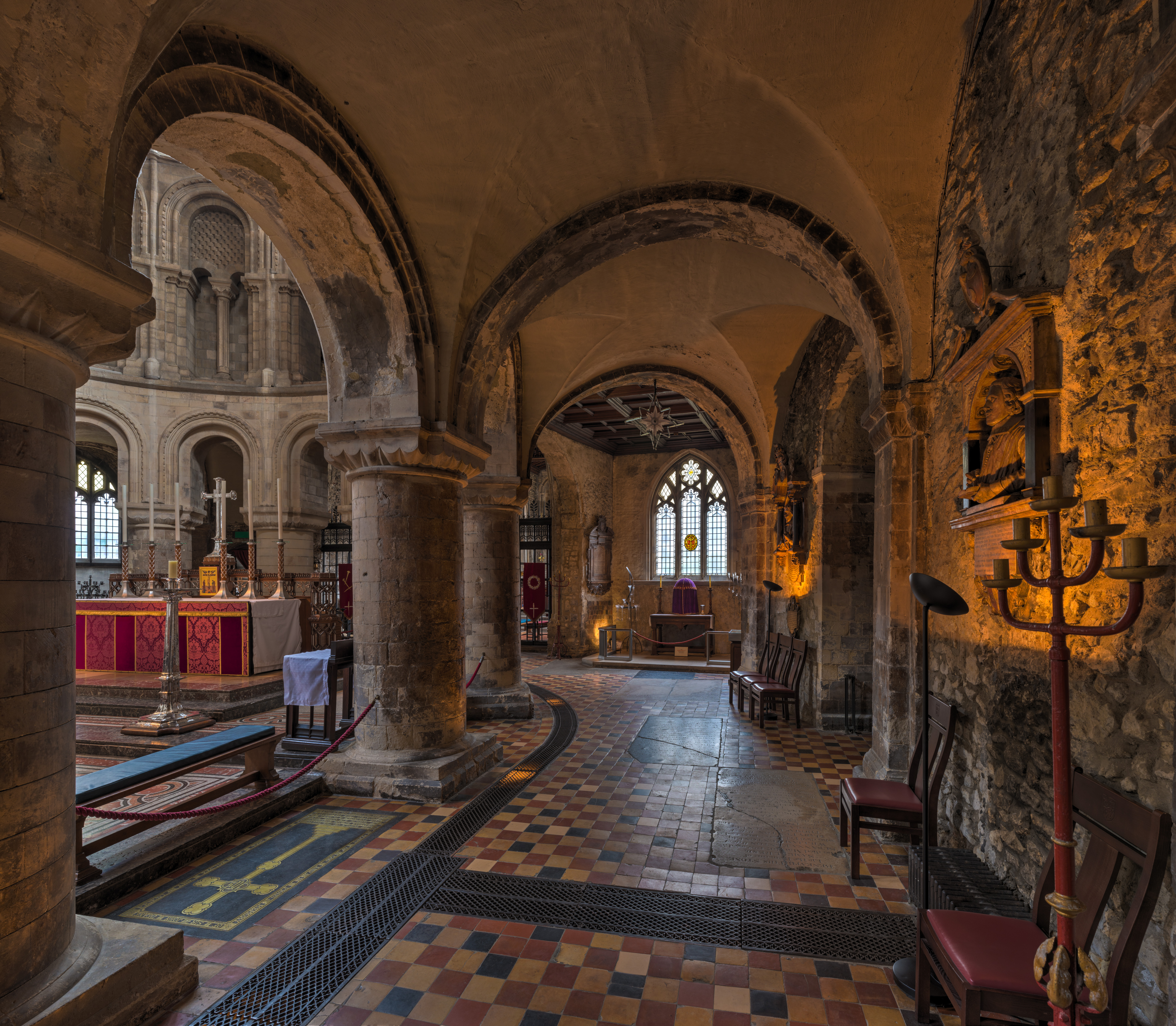
South aisle, looking east towards the Sanctuary and Lady chapel

The Lady chapel at the east end had been previously used for commercial purposes and it was there that Benjamin Franklin worked for a year as a journeyman printer.

The north transept of the present church was formerly used as a blacksmith's forge, then occupied by squatters in the 18th century.

In 1888, new parish school rooms, with basement rooms for youth clubs and a soup kitchen, were built on part of the former burial grounds. The works were funded by in part by the rector, Reverend Sir Borradaile Savory. The foundation stone was laid on 5 July 1888 by the Duchess of Albany.

=== Restoration ===
From 1889, the church was extensively restored under the direction of architect Sir Aston Webb. This saw the restoration of the Lady Chapel and surviving fragments of the south transept and the construction of a new flint-faced north transept, both to stabilise the structure of the crossing and to hide the scars at the West end where the demolished nave had once connected. The south transept was re-dedicated by Frederick Temple, Bishop of London, on 14 March 1891; and the south transept in February 1893 in the presence of the Albert Edward, Prince of Wales, Alexandra of Denmark (Princess of Wales), Edward White Benson (Archbishop of Canterbury) and other dignitaries. During Canon Edwin Savage's tenure as rector in the 1920s, the church was further restored at the cost of more than £60,000..

The Priory Church was one of the few City churches to escape major damage during the Blitz of the 1940s.

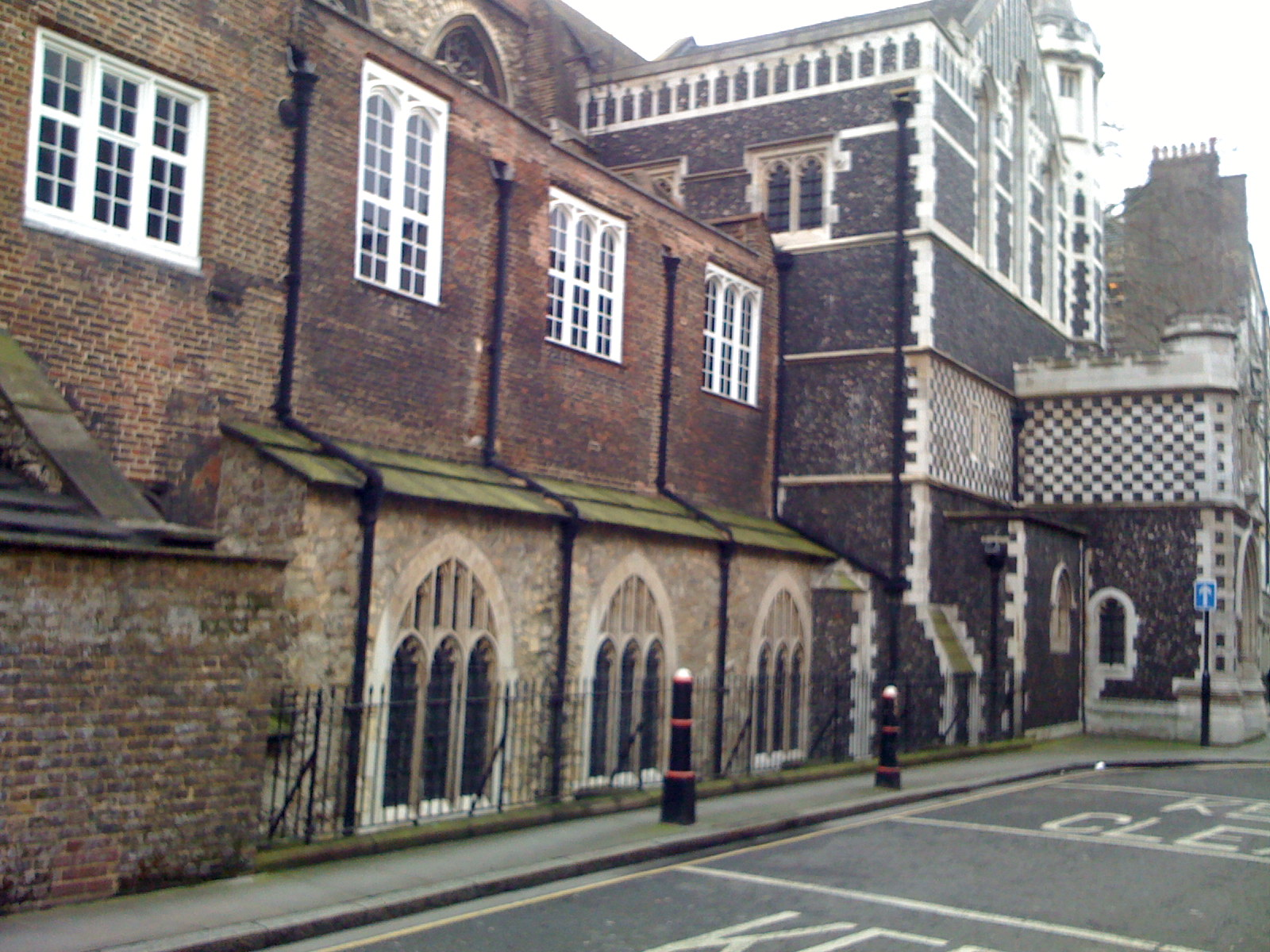
North aspect of the Priory Church from Cloth Fair

Charitable distributions in the churchyard on Good Friday continue a tradition established when twenty-one sixpences were placed upon the gravestone of a woman stipulating that the bequest fund an annual distribution to twenty one widows in perpetuity,. Hot cross buns are nowadays given not only to widows but others.

The Priory Church was designated a Grade I listed building on 4 January 1950. In April 2007 it became the first Anglican parish church to charge an entrance fee to tourists not attending a worship, an experiment that was discontinued. The church is open free of charge daily except during events and services.

=== United Benefice ===
For a few years the rector of St Batholomew the Great church was simultaneously priest-in-charge of the nearby St Bartholomew the Less. On 1 June 2015 the two parishes were dissolved and replaced with the new united benefice of Great St Bartholomew. The Rector of the former parish of St Bartholomew the Great became Rector of the united benefice and the parish boundary follows those of the two former parishes. A single Parochial Church Council and churchwardens are responsible for both churches. The parish church is St Bartholomew the Great, and St Bartholomew the Less is a chapel of ease within the parish. The latter sits within the curtilage of St Bartholomew's Hospital and now participates in an eucumenical and inter-faith chaplaincy to the patients and staff at the Hospital.

== Features ==
=== The Clock Tower ===
The brick clock tower was constructed in the South West corner of the truncated church in 1628. It has a small timber cupola and houses the earlier ring of pre-Reformation bells that were cast between 1500 and 1514.

=== Rahere Monument ===
Immediately to the North of the high altar is the monument to founder Rahere. This is in a mixture of the Decorated Gothic and Perpendicular Gothic styles. A painted effigy lies on top of the tomb under an elaborate canopy. It is unclear whether it is the resting place of Rahere's remains, or his monument, since it was constructed c. 250 years after his death in 1144.

=== Oriel window ===
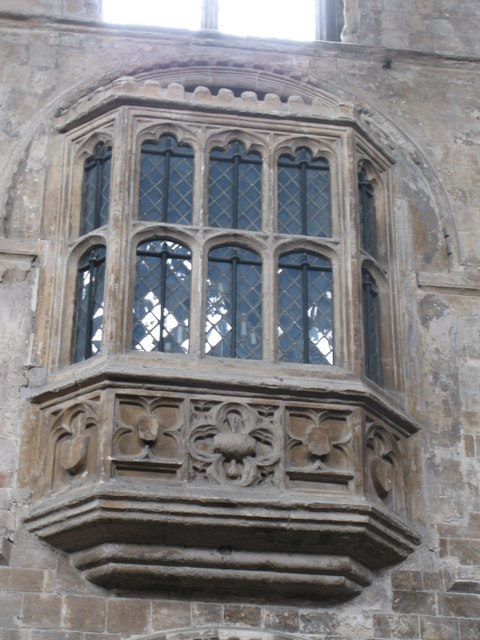
Prior William Bolton's oriel window

The interior Oriel Window was installed in the early 16th century by Prior William Bolton, allegedly so that he could keep an eye on the monks. The Prior's lodgings were adjacent to the south of the church. The symbol in the centre panel is a crossbow "bolt" passing through a "tun" (or barrel), a rebus or pun on the name of the prior. William Camden wrote:

It may be doubtful whether Bolton, Prior of St Bartholomew, in Smithfield, was wiser when he invented for his name a bird-bolt through his Tun, or when he built him a house upon Harrow Hill, for fear of an inundation after a great conjunction of planets in the watery triplicity

=== Lady Chapel ===
Said to be 'newly built' in 1336, the Lady Chapel extends to the east of the choir; the remains of the original medieval crypt are located underneath. The building was in secular use after the Dissolution of the Priory and divided into workshops and houses. Re-acquired by the parish in the late nineteenth century it was restored by Sir Aston Webb to something close to its original appearance, with much original stonework surviving.

=== Monastic buildings ===
Very little evidence of the monastic buildings now survives above ground. Three bays of the semi-derelict 15th century cloister were restored and extended by a further five bays in replica in the 1920s as a war memorial the new work using the surviving medieval footings. The approximate footprint of the cloister quadrangle was recreated as a grassed area when adjoining buildings were redeveloped in 2019. The approximate extent of the monastic enclosure is defined by the modern street of Bartholomew Close and Cloth Fair.

The principal remaining area of the churchyard is a raised garden on Cloth Fair laid out by the Metropolitan Public Gardens Association's landscape gardener Fanny Wilkinson in 1885.

== Associated organisations ==
St Bartholomew the Great is the adopted guild church of various City livery companies who host services there throughout the year: the Worshipful Company of Butchers (one of the seven oldest livery companies), the Worshipful Company of Founders (whose Hall is beside the church), the Worshipful Company of Haberdashers (incorporated 1448, one of the Great Twelve City Livery Companies) whose Hall is on the opposite side of West Smithfield, the Worshipful Company of Fletchers, the Worshipful Company of Farriers (incorporated 1674), the Worshipful Company of Farmers (incorporated 1955). More recent companies with a connection to the church are: Worshipful Company of Information Technologists (incorporated 1992), the Worshipful Company of Hackney Carriage Drivers (incorporated 2004), the Worshipful Company of Tax Advisers (incorporated 2005), the Company of Public Relations Practitioners (incorporated 2000).

The Priory Church served as the chapel of the Imperial Society of Knights Bachelor before the establishment of the Society's permanent chapel in St Paul's Cathedral in 2005.

== The Great Disputation ==
Starting in 1133, a yearly public disputation was held to mark the start of the Bartholomew Fair. The disputation was typically on theological matters, but later shifted to consider more political matters. Notable speakers included Thomas More. The yearly debate was ended along with the fair in 1855, but was revived in 2023 as part of a wider revival of Bartholomew Fair traditions.

=== List of disputations since 2023 revival ===
Year	Motion	In proposition	In opposition	Speaker
2026	"This House believes that the West has not fought a just war since the Second World War."	Tariq Ali; Lindsay German; Richard Norton-Taylor	Nigel Biggar; Tom Tugendhat	TBA
2025	"This House believes that America is still a shining city on a hill"	Karen Pierce; James Price; Daniel Hannan	Peter Hitchens; Ann Pettifor; Peter Oborne	Brian Leveson
2024	"This House believes that Christianity is intrinsically Socialist"	David Walker; Chine McDonald; Steve Chalke	Ann Widdecombe; Danny Kruger; Winston Marshall	Sarah Mullally
2023	"This House believes the love of money is the root of the nation’s evils."	Eddie Dempsey; Aaron Bastani; Giles Fraser	Alan Smith; Bim Afolami; Michael Gove	Sarah Mullally

== Film, television, radio & videos ==
The church was the location for the fourth wedding service in the film Four Weddings and a Funeral (1994) and of scenes in other films: Robin Hood: Prince of Thieves, Shakespeare in Love, the 1999 film version of Graham Greene's 1951 novel The End of the Affair, Amazing Grace (2006), Elizabeth: The Golden Age (2007), The Other Boleyn Girl (2008), Sherlock Holmes (2009), Richard II of The Hollow Crown (2012), Snow White and the Huntsman (2012), Testament of Youth (2014), Avengers: Age of Ultron (2015) and Transformers: The Last Knight (2017). It was also used in Taboo. It was used by T-Mobile as a stand-in for Westminster Abbey in its "royal wedding" advertisement (2011). It has also been the location for six music videos of Libera.

The BBC Radio 3 programme Choral Evensong has been livecast from the church, including a 2023 Evensong service to celebrate the 900th anniversary of the foundation.

Since 2021 the principal church services are simulcast on the parish YouTube channel and remain available online for two months.

== Rectors ==
Edward A. Webb's history of St Bartholomew-the-Great provides an account of each rector up to W. F. G. Sandwith.

- 1544–1563 John Deane (Note: Rector died in office) (founder of Sir John Deane's Grammar School)
- 1565–1569 Ralph Watson
- 1570–1579 Robert Binks
- 1580–1581 James Stancliffe
- 1582–1586 John Pratt
- 1587–1605 David Dee (Note: Dee was deprived of the rectorship in 1605)
- 1605–1644 Thomas Westfield (as Bishop of Bristol from 1642)
- 1644–c. 1655 John Garrett
- c. 1655–1663 Ralph Harrison (Note: Harrison was incumbent from at least 1655, and was instituted in 1660))
- 1663–1709 Anthony Burgess
- 1709–1717 John Pountney
- 1719–1738 Thomas Spateman (Prebendary of St Paul's)
- 1738–1760 Richard Thomas Bateman
- 1761–1768 John Moore
- 1768–1814 Owen Perrot Edwardes
- 1814–1819 John Richards Roberts
- 1819–1883 John Abbiss
- 1884–1887 William Panckridge
- 1887–1906 Sir Borradaile Savory
- 1907–1929 William Fitzgerald Gambier Sandwith
- 1929–1944 Edwin Sidney Savage
- 1944–1979 Newell Eddius Wallbank (Prebendary of St Paul's)
- 1979–1991 Arthur Brown
- 1991–1993 David Lawson (Note: Lawson's 1993 conviction for drink-driving meant that he would automatically lose his position unless otherwise overruled by the Archbishop of Canterbury)
- 1995–2016 Martin Dudley
- 2018–present Marcus Walker

Several rectors served as President of Sion College: Thomas Westfield (1631, 1632), Thomas Spateman (1732), Owen Perrot Edwardes (1785), Sir Borradaile Savory (1905).

== Music ==
=== Organ ===
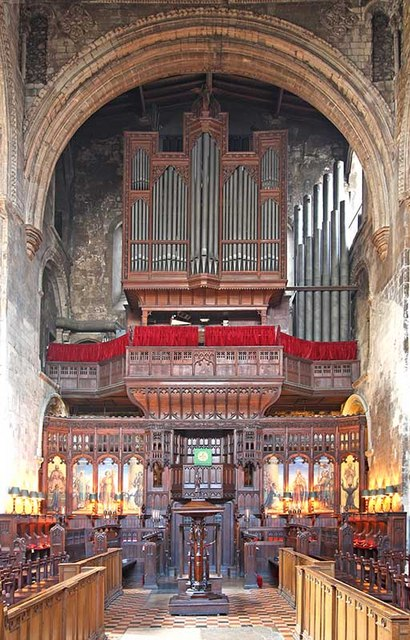
The Priory Church's pipe organ (2009)

St Bartholomew the Great had an organ installed by John Knopple in 1715, superseded by an organ in 1731 by Richard Bridge. In 1886, this was replaced by the organ from St Stephen Walbrook re-installed by William Hill. Modifications were made in 1931 by Henry Speechly & Son, in 1957 by N.P. Mander and in 1982–83 by the firm of Peter Wells. Specifications of this organ are detailed on the National Pipe Organ Register, but it is considered unplayable. The church is currently using a Viscount digital organ for services, pending the commissioning of a new instrument.

A new purpose-built pipe organ was commissioned in March 2025 from Eule Orgelbau (organ works), Bautzen, Saxony, Germany. Construction will begin in May 2026, delivery is planned for June 2027 and inauguration scheduled for March 2028. This programme is subject to ongoing fund-raising and donations are, in 2026, still needed.

=== Choirs ===
Unusually for a parish church, the Priory Church Choir comprises professional singers, directed by Rupert Gough. A choir of amateur singers, the Rahere Singers, sing for some services.

=== Organists ===
- Adrian van Helsding, 1715–21
- Isaac Orbell, 1721–31
- Rowland Evans, 1731–39/40
- Richard Ward, 1740–177
- Nicholas Steele, 177–1785
- Thomas Ball, 1785–73
- John Whitaker, 1793–1805
- William Bradley, 1805–19
- John Monro, 1819–27
- Miss Wafforne, 1827–34
- Jolly, 1834–36
- Elizabeth Ellen Wafforne/Williams, 1836–49 (became Mrs Williams in 1843)
- Mary Ann William, 1849–67
- Henry John Gauntlett, 1872–1876
- 1876–85, church was closed
- W. C. Ling, 1885–88
- W. A. B. Russell, 1888–93
- Clifford Parker, 1893–1913
- Leonard S. Jefferies, 1919–1934
- Nicholas Choveaux, 1934–48
- Paul Steinitz, 1949–61
- Brian Brockless, 1961–71
- Andrew Morris, 1971–79
- Brian Brockless, 1979–95
- David Trendell, 1995–2009
- James Sherlock, 2009–12
- Jeffrey Smith, 2012–14
- Ben Giddings, 2014–15

=== Director of music ===
In 2009 the roles of organist and director of music were divided into two posts.

- Nigel Short 2009–15

=== Organist and director of music ===
In 2015 the roles of organist and director of music were recombined.

- Rupert Gough, 2015–present

=== Sub-organist ===
- Ben Horden, January 2016 – May 2017
- James Norrey, 2017–present

== Notable burials and monuments ==
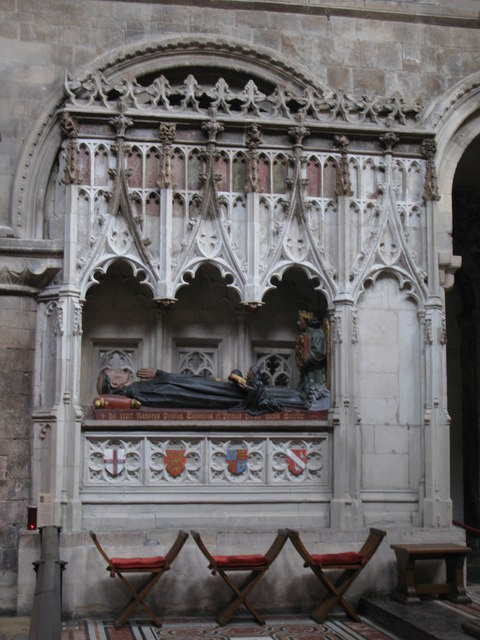
Prior Rahere's tomb

- Francis Anthony
- Sir George Hastings
- John Hovyngham
- Sir Rice Mansel
- Sir Walter Mildmay
- Prior Rahere

=== Notable people ===
- Sir John Betjeman, the Poet Laureate, took a flat overlooking the church in Cloth Fair and considered the church to have the finest Norman interior in London.
- 11th Duke of Devonshire and the Hon. Deborah Mitford celebrated their wartime marriage here in 1941.
- W. G. Grace, cricketer was a member of the congregation here
- William Hogarth, artist was baptised here
- William Peryn (died 1558), Catholic theologian and Prior of St Bartholomew
- Sir William Wallace in 2005 a memorial service was held for on the 700th anniversary of his execution in nearby Smithfield, organised by the historian David R. Ross.

== Folklore ==
The ghost of Rahere was reputedly seen, during repair work in the 19th century when his tomb was opened and a sandal removed. The sandal was returned to the church but not Rahere's foot, and since then, as a "shadowy, cowled figure appears from the gloom, brushes by astonished witnesses and fades slowly into thin air has been claimed to be seen annually on the morning of July the 1st at 7 am, emerging from the Vestry".

== See also ==
- Sir John Deane's College
- St Bartholomew the Less Church
- List of churches and cathedrals of London
- List of English abbeys, priories and friaries serving as parish churches
